= Cardiff International Arena =

Indoor arena in Cardiff, Wales

Utilita Arena Cardiff

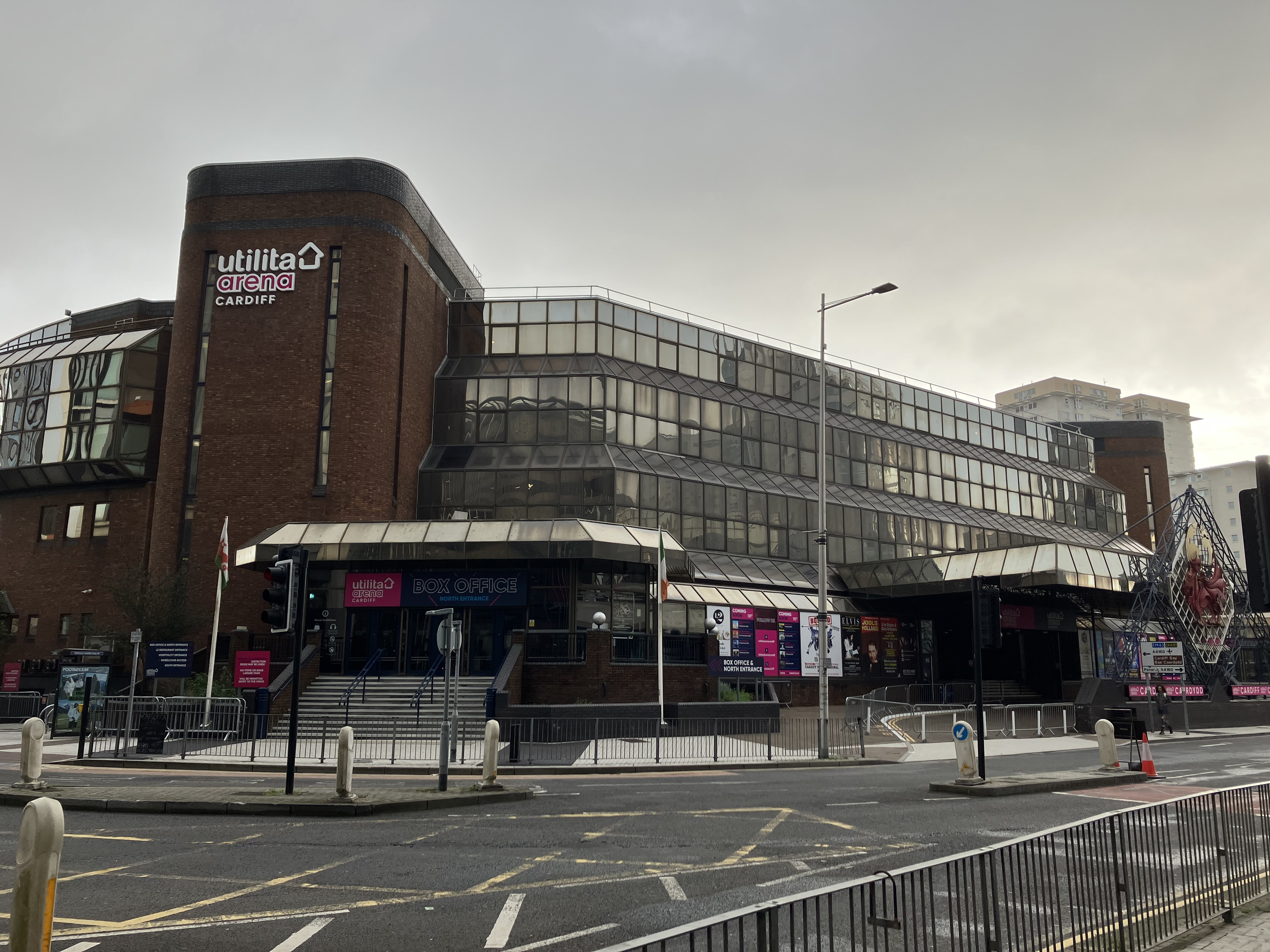
- The arena in 2023
- Interactive map of Utilita Arena Cardiff
- Former names: Cardiff International Arena & Convention Centre (1993–2000); Cardiff International Arena (2000–2011, 2022–2023); Motorpoint Arena Cardiff (2011–2021)
- Address: Mary Ann St; CF10 2EQ
- Location: Cardiff, Wales
- Coordinates: 51.478943°N 3.171737°W
- Owner: Cardiff Council (Freehold); Live Nation UK (Leasehold)
- Operator: Live Nation UK
- Capacity: 5,000 (seating); 7,500 (standing)

Construction
- Built: 1989–1993
- Opened: 9 September 1993
- Renovated: 2017–2018
- Cost: £23 million

Website
- utilitaarenacardiff.co.uk

Cardiff International Arena (formerly known as Cardiff International Arena & Convention Centre and Motorpoint Arena Cardiff and currently, for sponsorship reasons, as Utilita Arena Cardiff) is an indoor exhibition centre and events arena located in Cardiff, Wales, and was opened on 9 September 1993 by singer Shirley Bassey. It is Cardiff's largest purpose-built exhibition facility and its former name was due to a sponsorship agreement from 2011 to 2022. The upstairs of the building is known as the World Trade Centre.

The arena contains a number of function areas, the largest being the main arena which has hosted many national and international events, such as concerts, sports and comedy performances.

== History ==
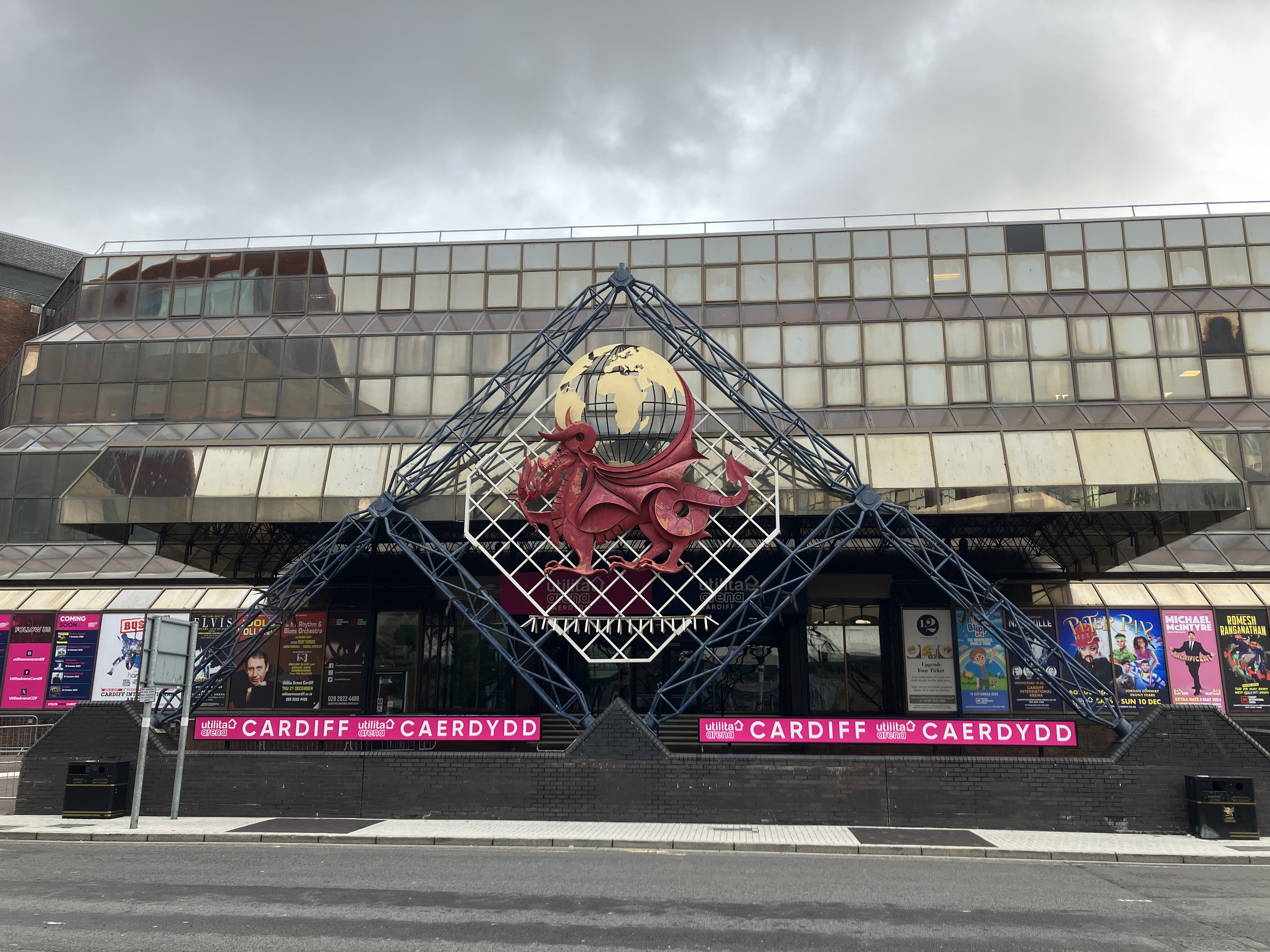
The red dragon outside the main entrance to the arena in 2023

During the construction phase, the venue was known as the Cardiff World Trade Centre and was first expected to open in January 1992. It formed part of a complex which included a new hotel built opposite that opened in 1990, the nearby Wales National Ice Rink and a number of surrounding office buildings.

The renamed arena was eventually opened on 9 September 1993, by Shirley Bassey, in front of 5,500 fans. The concert was later televised on BBC One on 30 July 1994. It was officially opened by Queen Elizabeth II on 14 October 1993.

The original lease was granted to the developer Brent Walker, who subsequently assigned it to The Ambassador Theatre Group. In 1999, SFX Entertainment acquired the arena. It is now owned by the US media giant Live Nation UK, who have confirmed they would cease to operate the existing arena and terminate their leasehold interest in the council-owned site if the new proposed 15,000-seat indoor arena in Atlantic Wharf is built to replace it and are successful in securing the operator lease. The CIA is then expected to be closed by Live Nation and could be demolished, along with the adjoining surface car parks and buildings owned by Rapport, to provide space for a new commercial development that would be integrated into the Canal Quarter on Churchill Way.

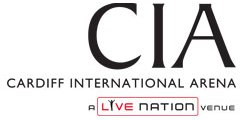
The CIA logo used before the arena was rebranded under the Motorpoint sponsorship agreement.

On 1 March 2011, the Cardiff International Arena was renamed Motorpoint Arena Cardiff, for sponsorship reasons, after the car sales company entered into an agreement regarding the naming rights to the arena for five years in what was called "a seven-figure investment". Other names who have performed in the arena are among Westlife, Kylie Minogue, One Direction, Jessie J, Anastacia, Steps, JLS, Jason Derulo and Mariah Carey.

In March 2015, the venue's 3000th event was marked by a show headlined by singer Katherine Jenkins. In July 2016, Motorpoint extended its naming rights contract with the arena until at least 2021. This included a complete re-branding of the building including installation of outdoor LED signage on the arena's towers. Across 2017 and 2018, the arena underwent a significant 18-month upgrade and refurbishment funded by Live Nation in time for its 25th anniversary; this included installation of a new bar by Carlsberg called The Danish Quarter, refurbishment of the smaller Exit 7 space and existing L2 Restaurant & Bar, updated hospitality suites and hearing loop system, as well as new lifts, facial recognition cameras and other security related upgrades.

The arena reverted back to its original CIA name on 22 September 2022 after being named Motorpoint Arena Cardiff since March 2011.

During August 2023 the arena was renamed Utilita Arena Cardiff, for sponsorship reasons, after the energy company entered into an agreement regarding the naming rights to the arena.

== Facilities ==
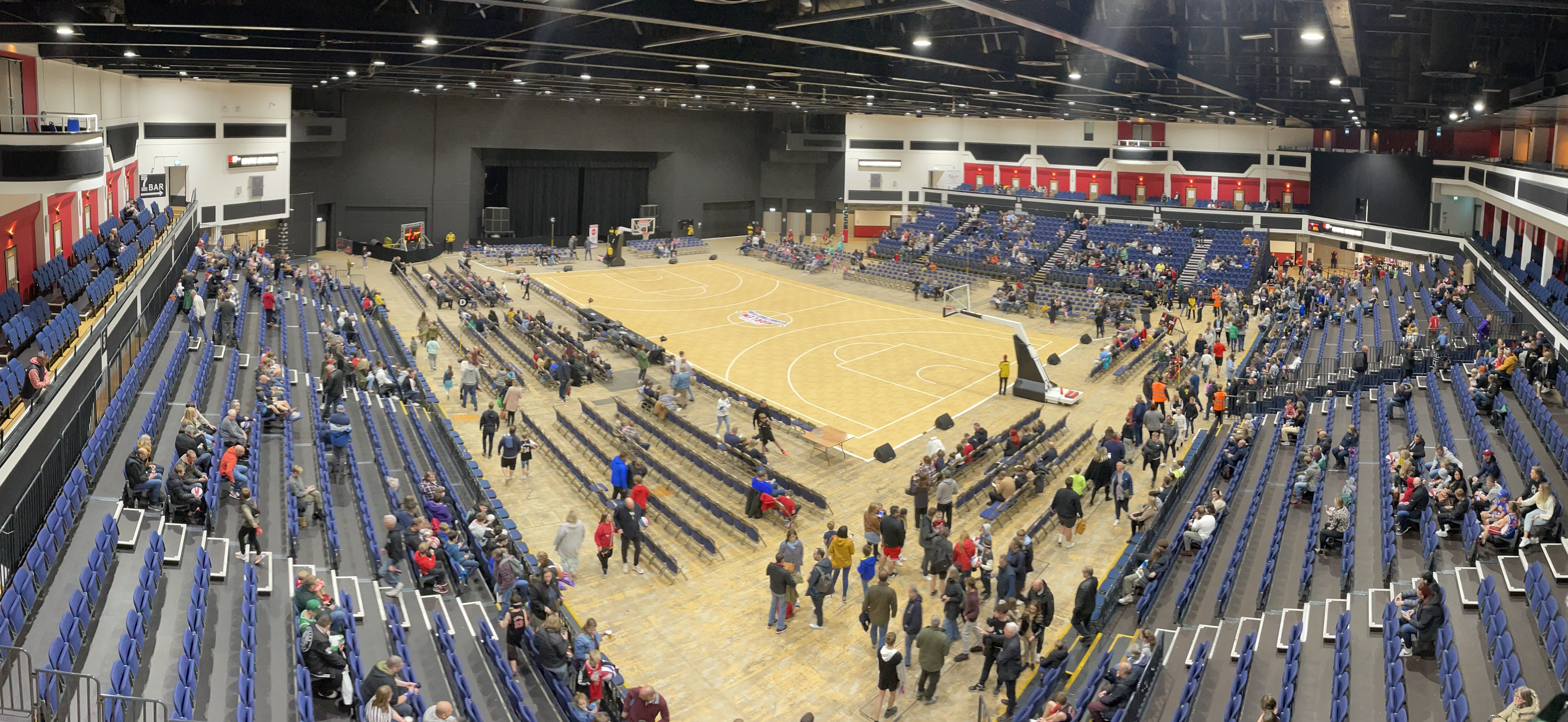
Inside the Cardiff International Arena in October 2022

The main arena offers 4,500 square metres of exhibition space, and is very versatile, for the number of different events that take place at the arena. Full capacity can reach 7,500, in a standing layout and 5,000, for a fully seated event.

There are over 30 additional areas, including a conference suite (groups of up to 460) and four executive boardrooms.

== Events ==
=== Comedy ===
Comedian Lee Evans has brought four tours XL Tour, Big, Roadrunner and Monsters to the arena, Evans played his last show before retiring from stand-up at the arena from 24 to 30 November 2014.

=== Music ===
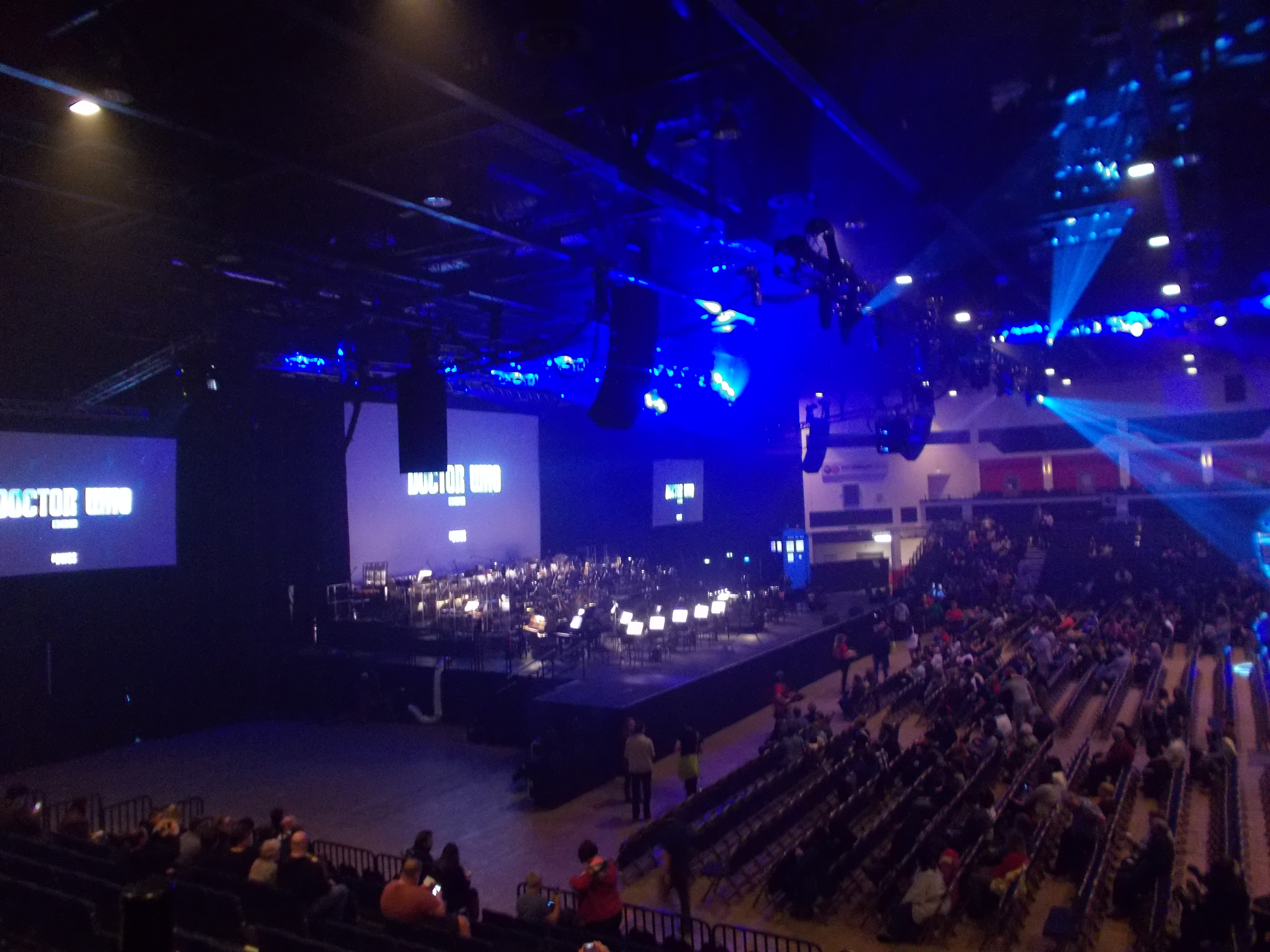
Doctor Who Symphonic Spectacular

The venue has hosted a number of concerts since it opened, with artists such as The Corrs, Queen+Paul Rodgers, A-HA, Sigrid, George Ezra, Richard Ashcroft, Mumford & Sons, Two Door Cinema Club, Fatboy Slim, The 1975, Bring Me The Horizon, Céline Dion, Kylie Minogue, Beyoncé, Lady Gaga, Katy Perry, Rihanna, Metallica, Enrique Iglesias, The Script, New Kids on the Block, Take That, Paloma Faith, Carrie Underwood, Michael Bublé, Steps, Craig David, Gary Barlow, James Blunt, Kelly Clarkson, Avril Lavigne, Liam Gallagher, Iron Maiden, Alice Cooper, Dio, Twisted Sister, Meat Loaf, Pink, Gwen Stefani, Girls Aloud, Sugababes, Gabrielle, LeAnn Rimes, Culture Club, Jessie J, Little Mix, Dolly Parton, Anastacia, Fifth Harmony, Leona Lewis, Ellie Goulding, Marina Diamandis, Olly Murs, Ella Eyre, John Newman, Westlife, Dua Lipa, Nicki Minaj, Noel Gallagher's High Flying Birds, The Killers, Lostprophets, Biffy Clyro, The Prodigy, The Nolans, The Beach Boys, Frankie Valli, McFly, Panic! at the Disco, Dropkick Murphys, Feeder, Fall Out Boy, You Me At Six, Blink 182, All American Rejects, Ben Howard, Arctic Monkeys, Paramore, Yungblud, The Vamps, One Direction, Niall Horan, Louis Tomlinson, 5 Seconds of Summer, and local favourites Catatonia, Kids in Glass Houses, Stereophonics, and the Manic Street Preachers.

=== Sport ===
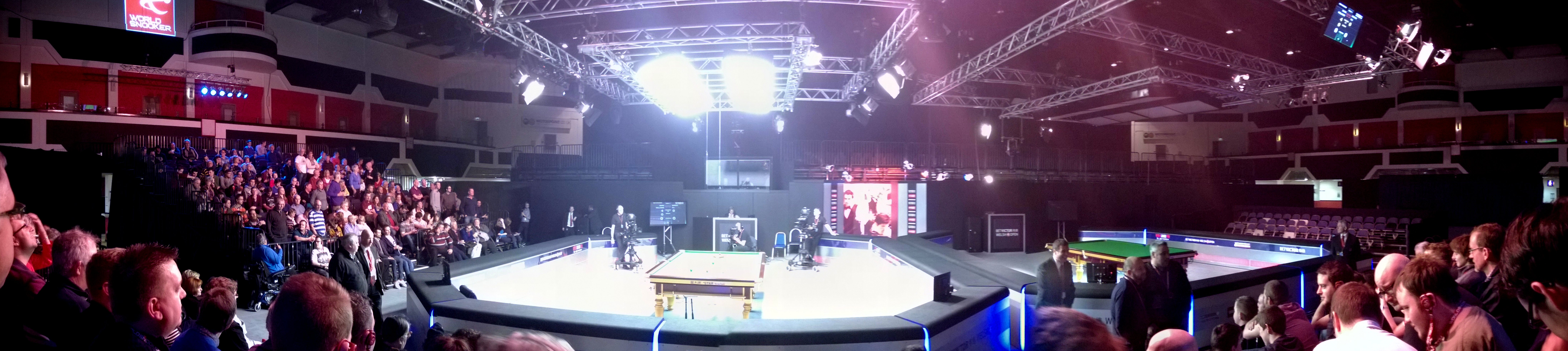
Arena hosting the Welsh Open snooker championship in 2015

In 1999, the Cardiff International Arena hosted the (Nine-ball) World Professional Pool Championship. The official WPA World Nine-ball Championship was hosted at the Cardiff International Arena between 2000 and 2003.

Since 2007, the arena has been one of the Premier League Darts venues, including the semi-finals and finals night of the 2008 Premier League Darts on 26 May 2008. The PDC Champions League of Darts was held in the arena in 2016 and 2017.

In February 2015, the Welsh Open snooker championship was transferred from the Newport Centre (where it had taken place since 2005) to the arena. The arena previously hosted the championship between 1999 and 2003. In 2021 the event was transferred back to Newport, this time held at the Celtic Manor Resort.

=== Professional wrestling ===
In 2019, WWE's NXT UK brand announced the venue would host the second ever TakeOver event for the brand, NXT UK TakeOver: Cardiff. This took place on 31 August 2019 and was the first TakeOver to take place in Wales. On 21 August 2024, All Elite Wrestling made their debut in Wales, airing Dynamite and Collision as part of All In London week. At the 2025 Forbidden Door, AEW announced their return to the venue for Collision on 13 December 2025.

== See also ==
- List of cultural venues in Cardiff
