= New Cardiff Bay Arena =

Planned development in Cardiff, Wales

- Atlantic Wharf Arena
- Rendering of the proposed arena
- Interactive map of New Cardiff Bay Arena
- Location: Atlantic Wharf, Cardiff Bay
- Coordinates: 51.4686°N 3.1645°W
- Owner: Cardiff Council
- Operator: Live Nation UK
- Capacity: 16,500; 15,358 (seated)

Construction
- Groundbreaking: September 2025
- Opened: 2028 (projected)
- Cost: £300 million (projected)
- Architects: Populous, HOK
- Builder: McLaren Construction Group (2025–2026)
- General contractors: WSP Global, Turner & Townsend
- Main contractor: Robertson Group

Website
- Project website

New Cardiff Bay Arena, also referred to as Atlantic Wharf Arena, is an indoor arena under construction in Atlantic Wharf, a southern area of the city of Cardiff, Wales.

The multi-purpose 16,500-capacity arena is being built on a site near to Cardiff Bay's Wales Millennium Centre (WMC) and is expected to open in 2028. It forms part of a wider masterplan to regenerate the city's wharf area with a large mixed-use development.

After a number of delays, construction began following the groundbreaking ceremony in September 2025 and is expected to be undertaken in four phases over multiple years: the first being the construction of the new arena, WMC's digital and "immersive" arts theatre, a replacement hotel and multi-storey car park followed by the relocation of the Red Dragon Centre's tenants into a new complex. The third phase of the masterplan would include a new office space delivered along with an additional hotel and finally new homes and apartments, with potential for more commercial space; the latter neighbourhood phase is dependent on proposed plans being approved to replace Cardiff Council's ageing County Hall with a new smaller purpose-built building.

== Background and location ==
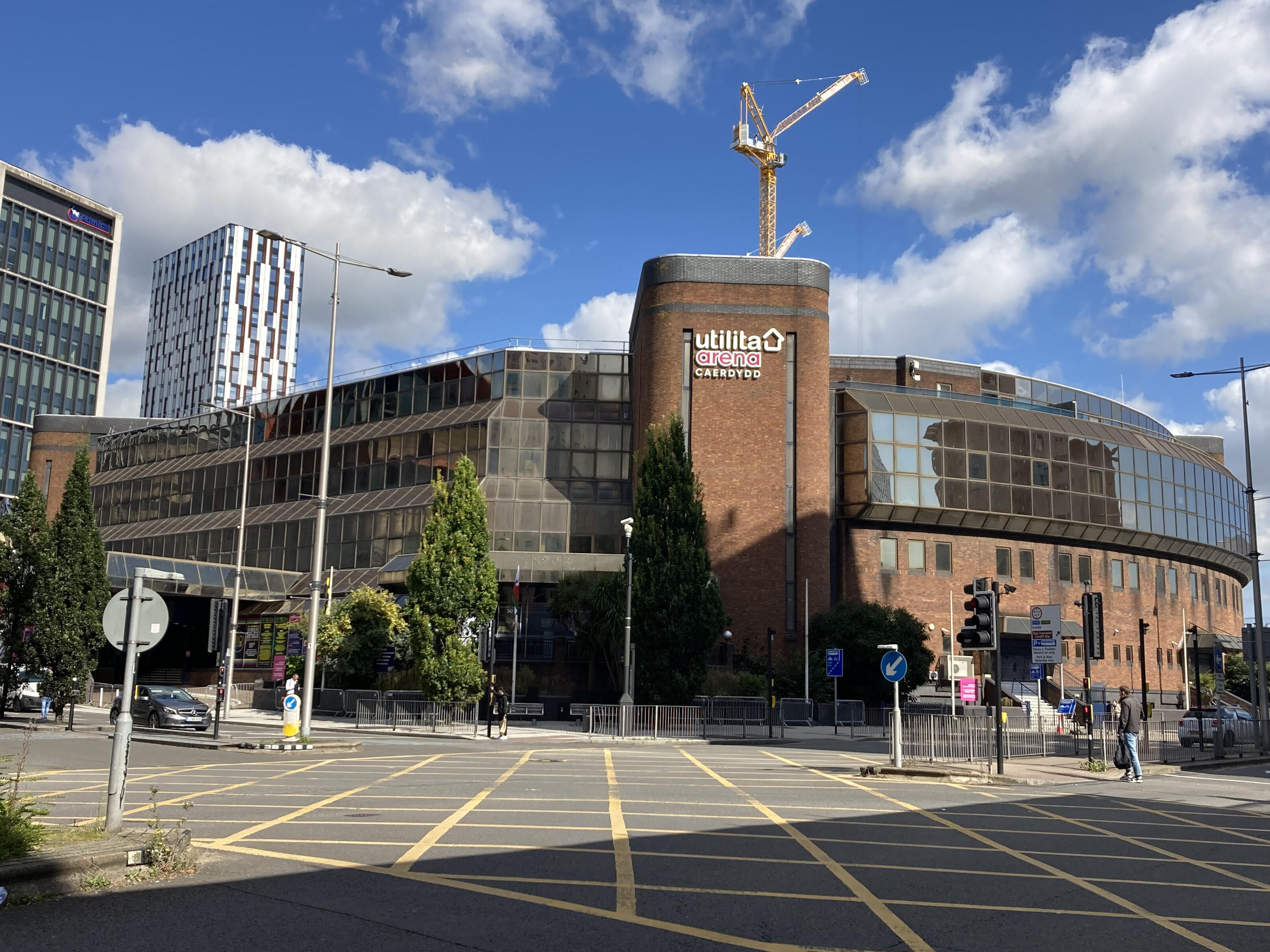
Cardiff International Arena is the city centre's indoor arena; the purpose-built venue lacks the capacity to host large-scale events

Currently the city lacks a large multi-purpose indoor arena suitable for hosting a number of major sporting and music events, such as concerts, the BBC Sports Personality of the Year and the Gymnastics World Championships, with a capacity of 10–15,000 to bridge the significant gap between that of the CIA and the Millennium Stadium, where the majority of large-scale events are hosted.

In November 2018, it was reported that a 15,000-seat indoor arena would be built on the site of the Red Dragon Centre, a large entertainment and leisure complex in the south of the city. The Atlantic Wharf site was chosen by the council as the preferred option over six other potential sites, including Callaghan Square near Cardiff Central railway station, the 5,000-seat Cardiff International Arena (CIA), with an arena also suggested as part of a £150m redevelopment of Cardiff Arms Park. In 2013, County Hall was first suggested as a potential future site for an indoor arena and convention centre; a decade later its car park would be confirmed as the exact location.

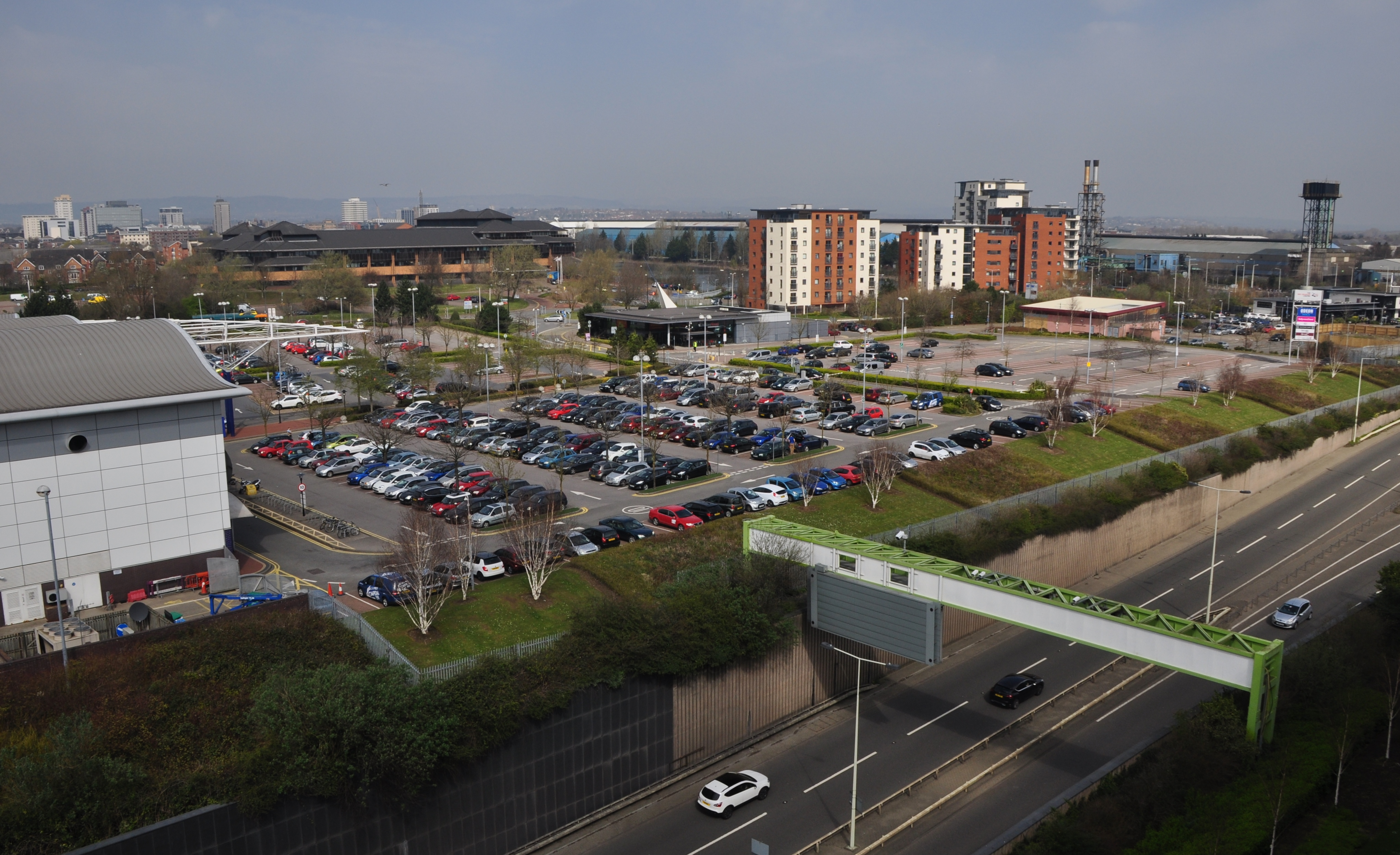
Part of the Atlantic Wharf site (pictured in 2014) outlined for redevelopment; to the left is the current Red Dragon Centre and surface car park, with Cardiff Council's County Hall in the far background

The current Red Dragon Centre is expected to be demolished in the coming years and replaced by a new leisure complex. Tenants would migrate over to the new property while the remaining parts of the project are built. A planning application for the arena was expected to be submitted in July 2019. On 17 December 2019, it was announced that Cardiff Council's cabinet had been granted permission for the local authority to purchase the Red Dragon Centre from the British Airways Pension Fund (BAPF) for an undisclosed sum. An element of the purchase price will only be payable to the pension fund when a planning application is submitted for the new arena project on any part of the 30 acres (12 ha) Atlantic Wharf site (the combined County Hall on Schooner Way and Red Dragon Centre on Hemingway Road) within a 10-year period. The development area also covers parts of Lloyd George Avenue and Silurian Park.

== History ==
=== Development phase ===
The council aimed to appoint a development partner and operator for the new arena by April 2020 and for a detailed planning application to be submitted by the selected developer before September 2020. Construction work was first projected to begin in May 2021 so the arena could open in June 2023. The new arena was expected to be based on the Ziggo Dome in Amsterdam.

=== Operation ===
Live Nation UK, the operator and leaseholder of the city centre's CIA, has approached the council with a view to operating the new venue if it is built. On 27 November 2020, Live Nation and builders Robertson Group were announced as the winning bidders to operate and construct the venue. Entertainment investors Oak View Group are also part of the consortium. Live Nation subsequently agreed to make a £100m financial contribution towards the project to cover increased costs and would commit to a future long-term lease of the venue. Once the new arena is operational, the CIA is then expected to be closed by Live Nation and could be demolished, along with the adjoining surface car parks and buildings owned by Rapport, to provide space for a new commercial development integrated into Churchill Way's Canal Quarter. The arena is projected to deliver between 130 and 150 events per annum and an additional 1.5 million visitors to Cardiff Bay each year.

=== Architecture and design ===
In October 2023, it was revealed that the arena's dimensions and exterior design had been significantly revised by Populous as part of wider alterations to the project due to rising material costs; the seating bowl capacity was reduced from 17,000 (that was initially approved by the council in March 2022) to a more flexible 15,358, with the opening date now pushed back until 2026.

Following the redesign to achieve 'greater cost certainty', the arena is now projected to cost £250 million; due to inflation the original design had increased by one hundred million to £280 million. The price includes the rebuild and relocation of the hotel next to the centre. A planning application for the original design proposed by HOK, inspired by the waterfront, docks and the city's historical coal and steel industries, had been submitted in January 2022, and was granted full planning permission by Cardiff Council in February 2023. It was hoped that it would achieve a BREEAM Excellent rating and was described as 'bold' and a 'lump of coal' by some in the media. The new compact design by Populous features a smaller, more rectangular shape with a 'swoop' above the main facade, two illuminated arches on each side and increased glazing, with a lighter bronze colour palette and light gold soffits designed to complement key surrounding buildings and was inspired by the Welsh mountains.

The arena will feature a curtain wall system, manual doors and a compact seating bowl designed to minimise the building's footprint while positioning spectators close to the stage with clear sightlines, aiming to replicate the atmosphere of a smaller venue. Unlike traditional arena designs, hospitality seating is expected to be integrated directly with general admission rather than separated, alongside a large standing area on the main floor intended to enhance crowd energy during concerts. Wheelchair-accessible viewing positions will be distributed across all tiers of the bowl, including within the premium hospitality clubs and private suites. VIP and reception entrances will be situated to the east, with a services entrance on the west side.

=== Construction progress ===
The new Cardiff Bay Arena and hotel under construction

In November 2023, it was reported that enabling works were now expected to begin in January 2024, in preparation for construction work to start in June that year. An update in August 2024 reported that the work was to start sometime in 2025 with the arena expected to open in the second half of 2027. In October, it was reported that McLaren Construction Group were now favourite to win the contract to build the arena as the remaining rival bidder Vinci SA was no longer thought to be in the running. In June 2025, removal of County Hall's surface car park and preparation work on the site was nearing completion.

The project was given the final go ahead in August 2025, with McLaren announced as the main contractor. The following month it was reported that construction costs had risen to £300 million. Construction of a new Travelodge hotel began at the same time, with completion planned to align with the opening of the new arena. By January 2026, the core structure of the arena was being installed on site. In November 2026, the consortium behind the deal to build the new arena said it was taking over construction itself after parting ways with McLaren. The contractor declined to comment further on the reasons behind the decision.

=== Further plans ===
Further plans, that could form part of a £500m regeneration scheme, include waterfront apartments, bars and restaurants, a cinema complex and a hotel. To be built alongside the arena is a proposed new stand-alone 550-seater digital and "immersive" arts theatre as part of a creative production centre known as Capella that would include an exhibition space on the ground floor and facilities for production, rehearsal and training. The new theatre, that forms the third phase of development of the WMC, will be opposite the existing main building of the WMC (phase 1 and 2 opened in 2004 and 2009 respectively) and located in the car park of the Atlantic Wharf and part of the parking area of Cardiff Council's County Hall. The building will incorporate the council's new modern headquarters. The proposed design was revised in August 2026 and is described as a “dual-use civic ensemble”.

A new 900-space multi-storey car park (MSCP) will also be built on the existing surface car parking and stacked into a much smaller area enabling the site to be regenerated. The new car park is part of a commitment from the council in support of the new indoor arena and is required to meet the terms of the leases of tenants of the Red Dragon Centre; the council confirmed it was seeking permission to enter a build contract with Goldbeck Construction for the theatre and multi-storey car park, the latter of which could be built by the end of next year. Cardiff Council originally intended for the MSCP to have a larger capacity with 1,300 spaces, but in January 2024 instead opted to purchase the existing Q-Park in Pierhead Street.

== See also ==
- List of cultural venues in Cardiff
