= Libraries in Cardiff =

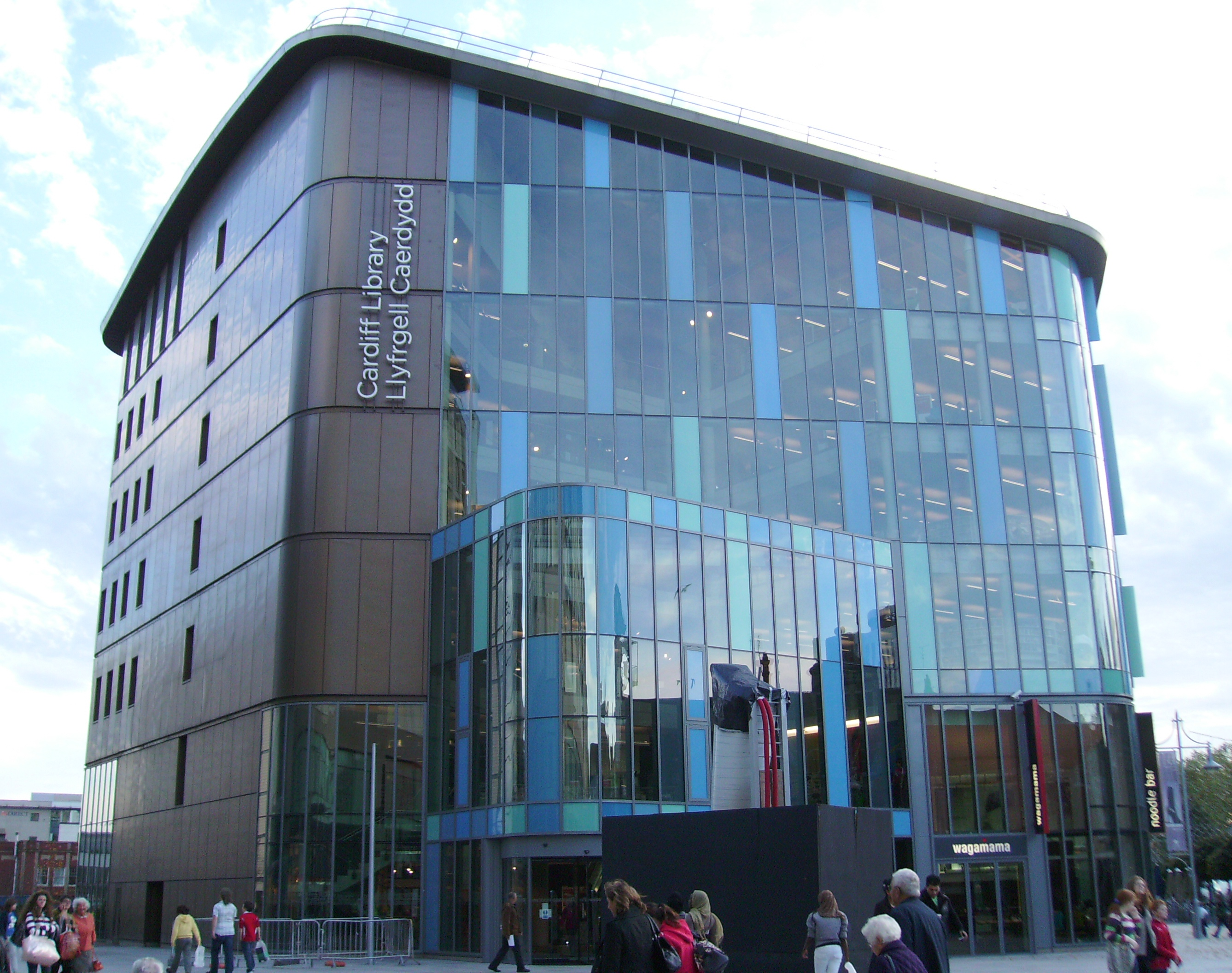
Cardiff Central Library, opened in 2009

Public libraries in Cardiff are owned and operated by Cardiff Council. There are 20 public libraries in the capital of Wales, the largest of which is Cardiff Central Library. A mobile library service is also provided. In 2018/19, there were almost 91,000 Cardiff residents, around 25% of the city's population, who borrowed an item from a municipal library. Increases in visits, active borrowers and library members took place during 18/19 as the service continued to grow in popularity with Cardiff's citizens.

There are 280 computers in libraries in Cardiff due to the £70,000 of capital funding that was provided to replace and upgrade these facilities. Internet access is offered free of charge at every branch. Cultural events are regularly held at city library branches.

The first city library opened in central Cardiff in 1861, followed by the city's first branch library in Splott in 1894. The latest building to serve as Central Library opened in 2009 as part of a major reconstruction of the eastern city centre, including the St. David's 2 project.

Cathays, Canton and Whitchurch Libraries are Carnegie Libraries, built with money donated by Scottish businessman and philanthropist Andrew Carnegie.

== History ==
In 1861, a free library was set up by voluntary subscription above the St Mary Street entrance to the Royal Arcade in Cardiff. By 1862, the Public Libraries Act 1855 allowed local councils with 5,000 inhabitants or more to raise a rate of one penny in the pound to provide a public library. Cardiff was the first town in Wales to establish a public library.

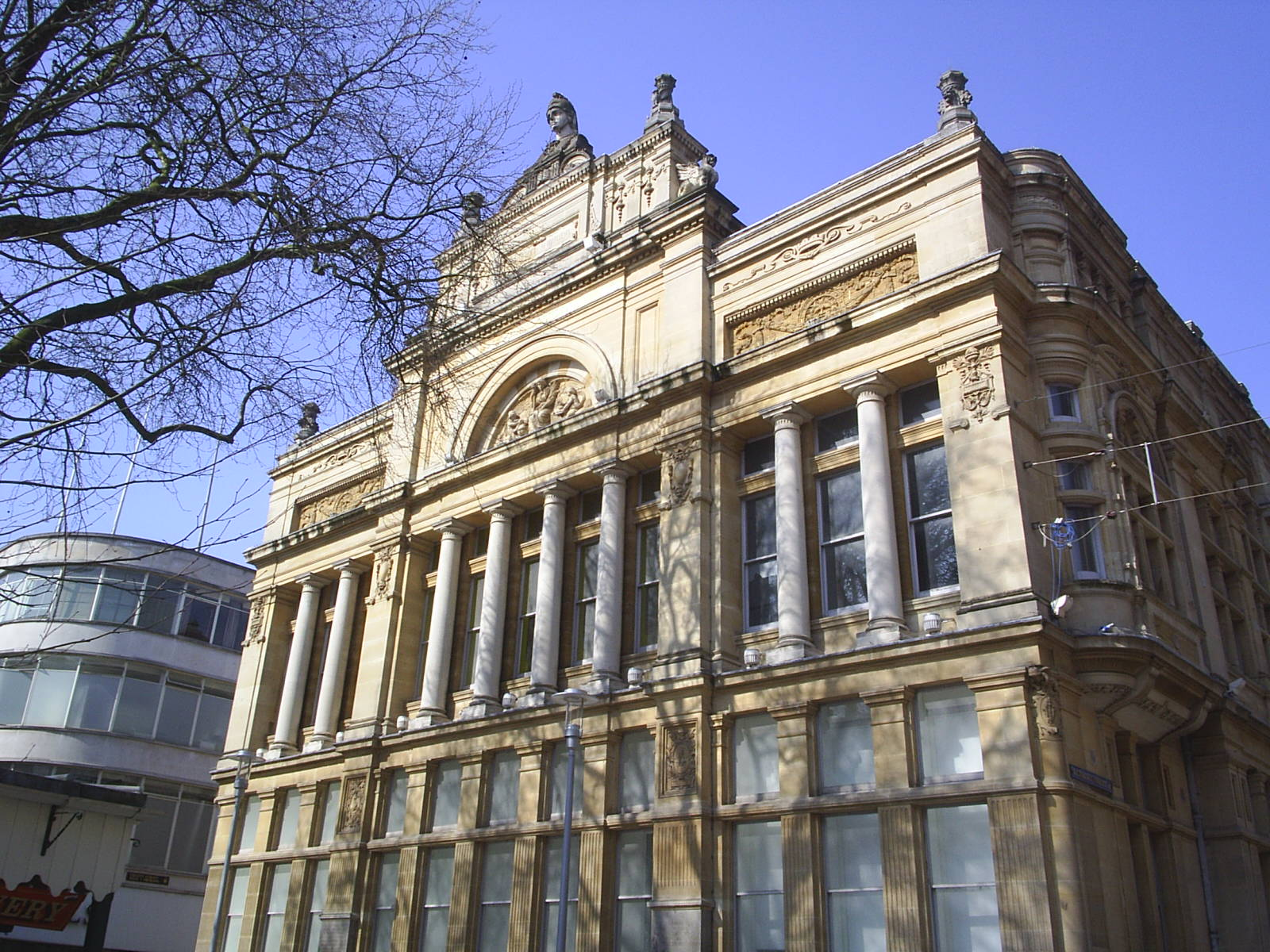
The Old Library, 1882 to 1988

== Overview ==
Library	Items borrowed 2018-19	PCs
Canton	91,041	16
Cathays	48,160	15
Central	380,213	90
Ely	44,118	20
Fairwater	39,929	7
Grangetown	34,308	7
Llandaff North	50,502	6
Llanishen	38,111	2
Llanrumney	25,686	7
Penylan	123,839	15
Powerhouse	28,876	7
Radyr	69,314	6
Rhiwbina	118,571	4
Rhydypennau	111,944	5
Rumney	17,959	5
STAR	26,567	20
St Mellons	39,399	15
Whitchurch	64,385	11

=== Usage ===
Cardiff Central is the most used library in Cardiff. Penylan is the most used branch library in the city, whereas Rumney is the least used, according to 2018-19 usage statistics.

The city's 20 branch libraries and mobile library were visited more than 2.6 million times (3.4 including virtual visits) in 2018/19 and almost 1.4 million items were borrowed. In 2018/19 Cardiff had more than 9,400 visits to the library per 1,000 of the population. Cardiff Central Library received 638,189 visits in 2018/19, with 380,213 items borrowed.

=== Catalogue ===
Across Cardiff libraries, crime and romance are the most popular books, with James Patterson, Danielle Steel and Alexander McCall Smith among the most borrowed. More than half of the most borrowed books are aimed at youngsters. Cardiff-born Roald Dahl, Gruffalo author Julia Donaldson, Jacqueline Wilson, Terry Deary, creator of the Horrid History series, and Enid Blyton are among those most likely to be borrowed by children and young teenagers.

The city's libraries have an important catalogue, with more than 1.6 million items in 2018/19, including 823,168 adult fiction books, 525,810 children's fiction books and 18,207 audio-visual items.

=== Modernisation ===
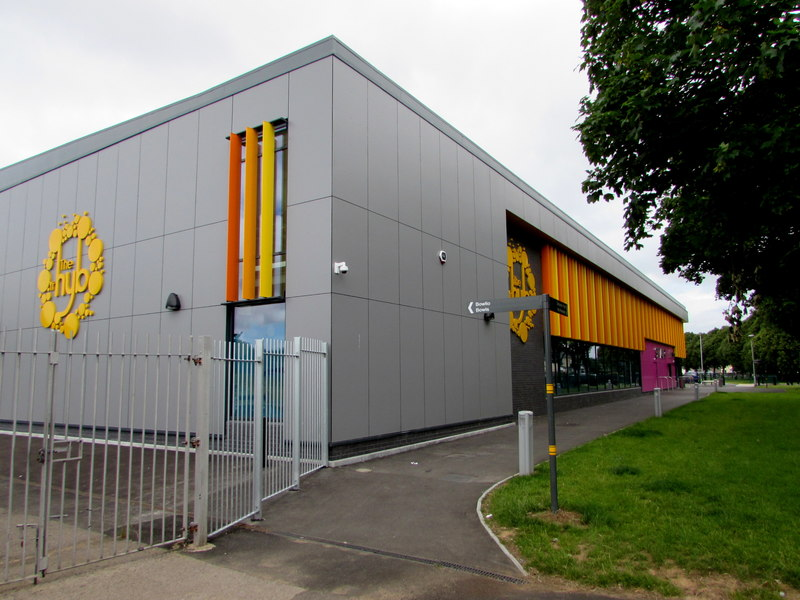
STAR hub in Splott with 'The Hyb' (The Hub) logo visible

The library network has largely been rebranded as hubs ("Yr Hyb" in Welsh) or being made part of community centres, to aid budget cuts but some critics have stated this had led to de-professionalisation of library services.

=== Services ===
Internet access on public computers and free WiFi are offered free of charge at all branches. Different events take place at the libraries all over the year. Cardiff Hubs & Libraries service is free for all to join, with 99% of households within Cardiff being within a 2 mile radius of a hub or library. Provision is also offered through a mobile library service, housebound and prison library service.

The service actively works to remove barriers to membership for the diverse communities of Cardiff and beyond. Resources are provided in 25 languages including Welsh, European and community languages. A range of accessible formats are also provided including large print, audio books, Braille and eBooks. During 2018/19 an accessible navigation app was launched in collaboration with UCAN Go at Central Library Hub to aid those with visual impairments, mental health issues or dementia, to plan and take full advantage of the service available. Staff have undertaken relevant training, e.g. dementia friends, British Sign Language and autism awareness. Tablets are available at all hubs and libraries which facilitates access for deaf customers to a sign video app and enables direct communication to interpreters.

== Central Library ==
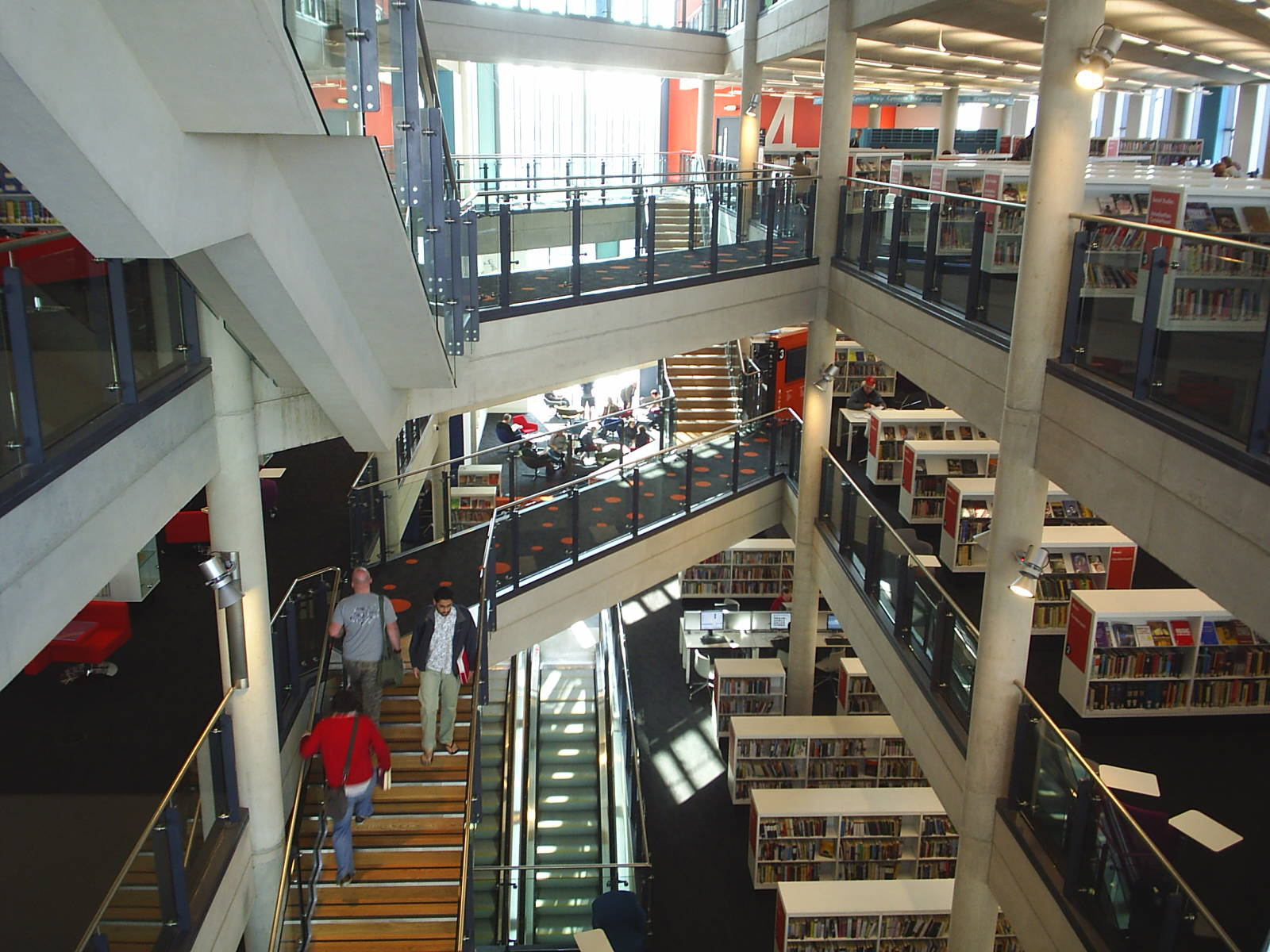
Cardiff Central Library interior

Cardiff Central Library (Welsh: Llyfrgell Ganolog Caerdydd) is situated in The Hayes area of the city centre of Cardiff. It opened on 14 March 2009 and was officially opened a few months later on 18 June 2009 by the Manic Street Preachers.

The building cost £13.5 million to build and construction took 98 weeks involving nearly 1,200 workers. 2000m² of glass form part of the exterior walls. The length of shelving for the books totals 3 kilometres. The library contains 55,000 sq. ft of space, 90,000 books, 10,000 of which are written in Welsh, and an additional 10,000 CDs and DVDs.

The building was specifically designed to be energy-efficient, and includes a sedum grass roof to improve insulation and reduce rainwater run-off, coloured glass panels and solar shading to prevent excessive heat gains, and a full building management system to provide climate control to individual floors. As a result of these measures the building was awarded a BREEAM rating of 'excellent'.

There are a total of six floors. The library's facilities include a customer service centre for Cardiff County Council, meeting rooms, ITC and display suites, public computers and free Wi-Fi access. The fifth floor is used as a digital zone with more than 40 PCs. On the fourth floor is the Cardiff Capital Collection with books on the history of Cardiff, the Wales Collection with books on the history of Wales, and Welsh-language publications among other non-fiction items. The third floor is dedicated to fiction, with a huge catalogue of crime, science fiction and graphic novels. The second floor is the advice hub and the first floor is dedicated to children. The ground floor is primarily dedicated to helping with registering online for Transport For Wales concessionary bus passes, with a front desk where people can get access to information and recycling bags, collect reserved books and give them back. At the lower end of the ground floor is a section for registering interest in volunteering within the library.

== Branch libraries ==
=== Canton ===
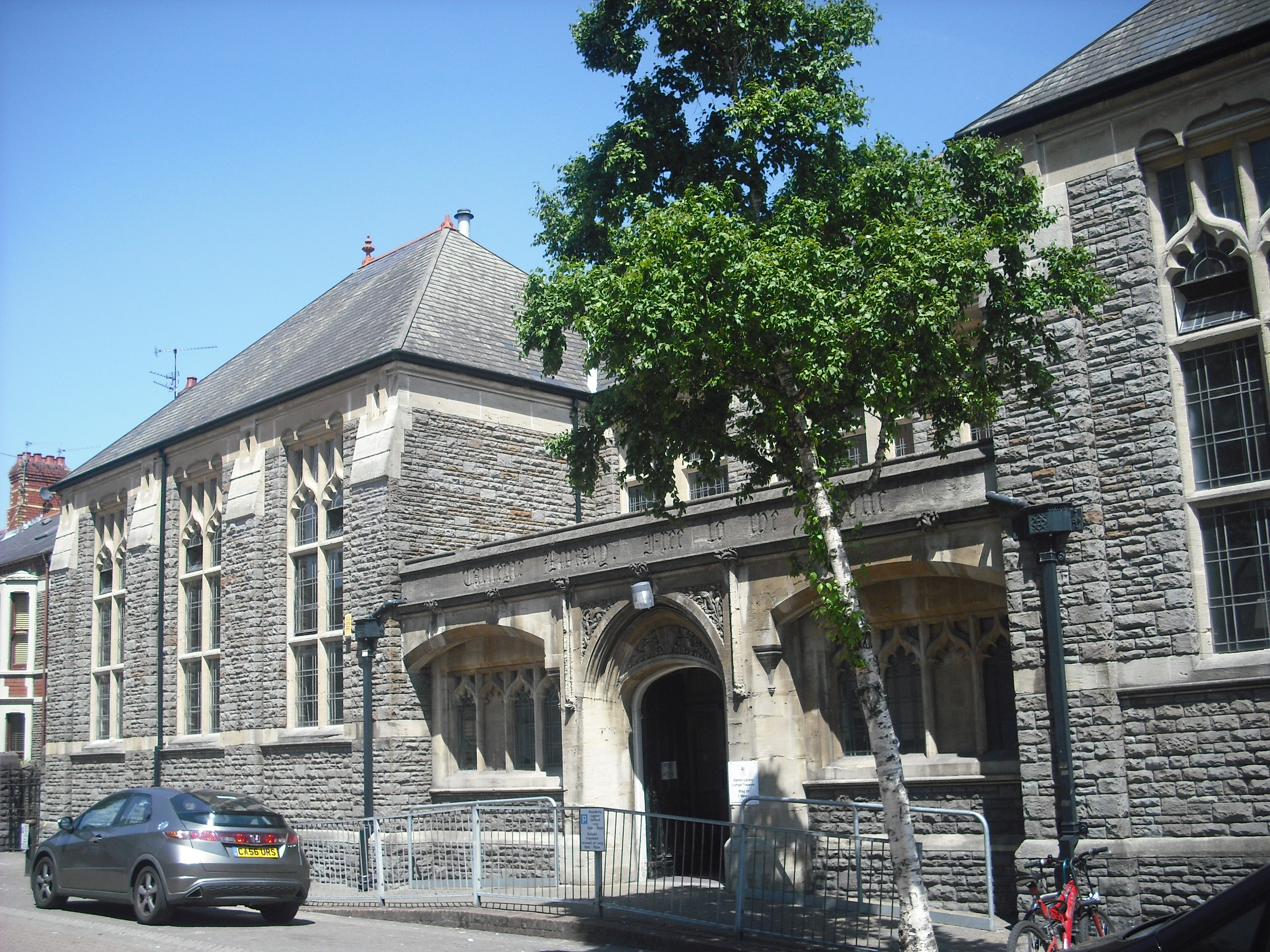
Canton Library

Canton Library (Welsh: Llyfrgell Treganna) is situated on the busy Cowbridge Road East, near the Chapter Arts Centre in Canton, in the west of the city.

The branch is a Carnegie Library, and one of the busiest libraries in the city. In 2013 it was re-opened after a full refurbishment.

Storytimes, craft activities and an adult reading group are available at the branch.

=== Cathays ===
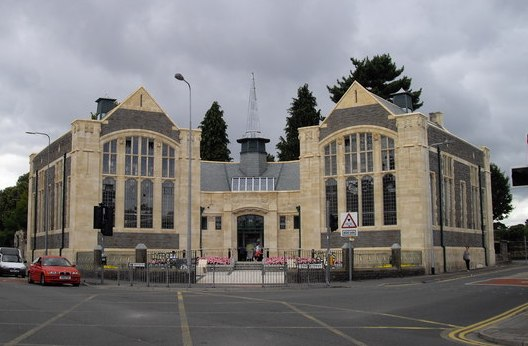
Cathays Library

Cathays Branch and Heritage Library (Welsh: Llyfgell Cangen a Threftadaeth Cathays) is a Carnegie building opened in 1907. It is prominently situated on a busy junction in Cathays, in the north of the city, next to Cathays Cemetery. It is a Grade II listed building and contains notable architectural features. The library serves a largely student and young family population.

The library reopened on 26 July 2010 after a £1 million refurbishment, of which £300,000 was provided by the Welsh Assembly Government. The work saw the western wing by Whitchurch Road brought back into use, the roof replaced and improvements made to the outside area. Local Liberal Democrat councillors aimed to see a community room included as part of the plans for the building.

A language and play storytime sessions, as well as local councillors' surgeries are held in the library. There are 15 public PCs and a WiFi network with free Internet access available.

=== Ely ===
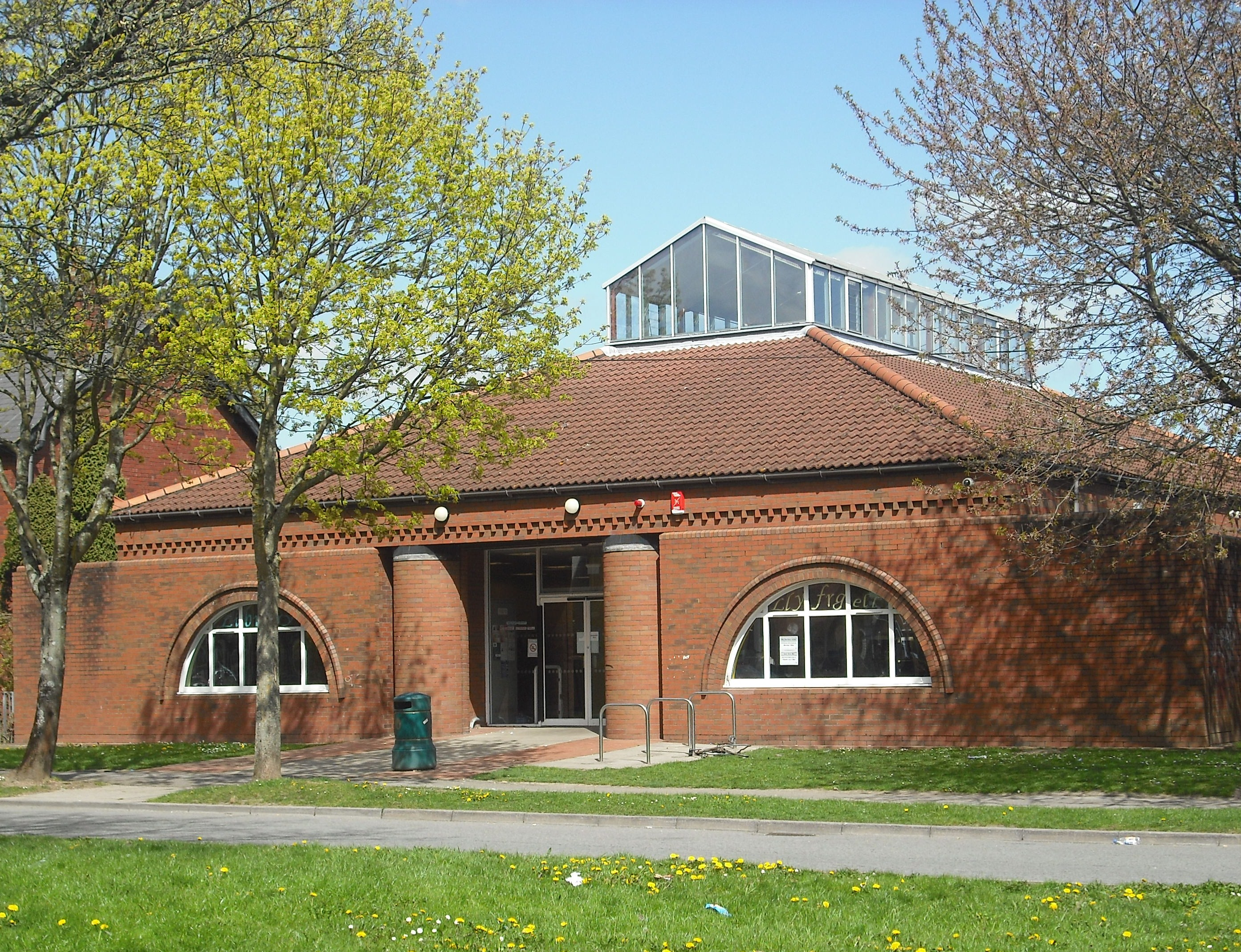
Old Ely Library building (demolished in 2015)

Ely and Caerau Community Hub (Welsh: Hyb Cymunedol Trelái a Chaerau) was situated at the junction of Cowbridge Road West and Grand Avenue, in Ely, serving a large area in the south west of Cardiff. Ely Library underwent development in 2014, moving into the Jasmine Centre on Cowbridge Road. The library, like others in the Cardiff area became a 'hub', joining with other council services in one building. In May 2015 the pre-existing 1986 library (housed in a building designed by staff and students of the Welsh School of Architecture) was demolished.

The library's range included a range of fiction, non-fiction, books on CD and cassette and DVDs. The children's area had a selection of board, picture and story books, children's DVDs and talking books. Newspapers for adults and children were available to read in the library. Free Internet access was available on 16 computers, two of which were child-only computers. An adult reading group met at Ely Library. Language and play sessions, and holiday time activities were available for children.

=== Fairwater ===
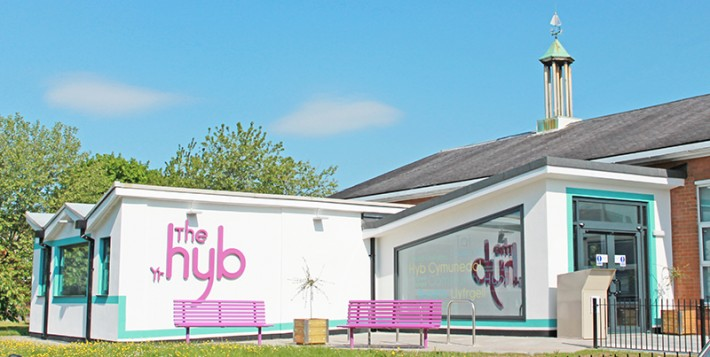
Fairwater Library Hub

Fairwater Library Hub (Welsh: Llyfrgell a Hyb Tyllgoed) stands on an elevated position opposite Fairwater Green in the heart of Fairwater in the western part of the city.

The library was built in 1960, and for years librarians at Fairwater Library knew various submissions for refurbishments, without success until years later. A refurbishment scheme transformed the former library on Fairwater Green into a new community hub, opening in July, 2016.

There are seven computers with free access to the Internet. Language and play sessions for pre-school children are held at the library, and a children's area is available. Local councillors hold regular surgeries at the library.

=== Grangetown ===
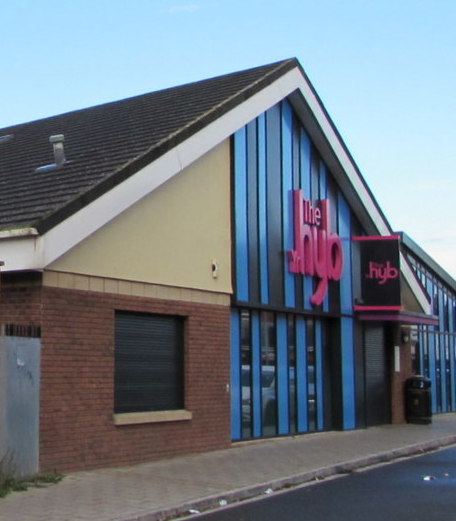
Grangetown Community Hub

Grangetown Hub (Welsh: Hyb Grangetown) is located in the southern district of Grangetown.

The hub opened in 2006 on a former car park at a cost of £750,000, incorporating a bright open area. The original Victorian library serving Grangetown dates from the 20th century and was renovated into 13 apartments after being bought by renovators after its closure in 2006, saving the building from demolition.

Grangetown Hub has been praised by the Welsh Assembly Heritage Minister for its wide variety of materials in the languages of the different ethnic groups living in the area.

PCs are available with free internet access in the library. There is a Citizens Advice Bureau service as well as a housing and benefit service. There is a Community Room where various groups can meet, such as Grangetown Community Concern, Grangetown Historical Society and Age Concern.

=== Llandaff North ===
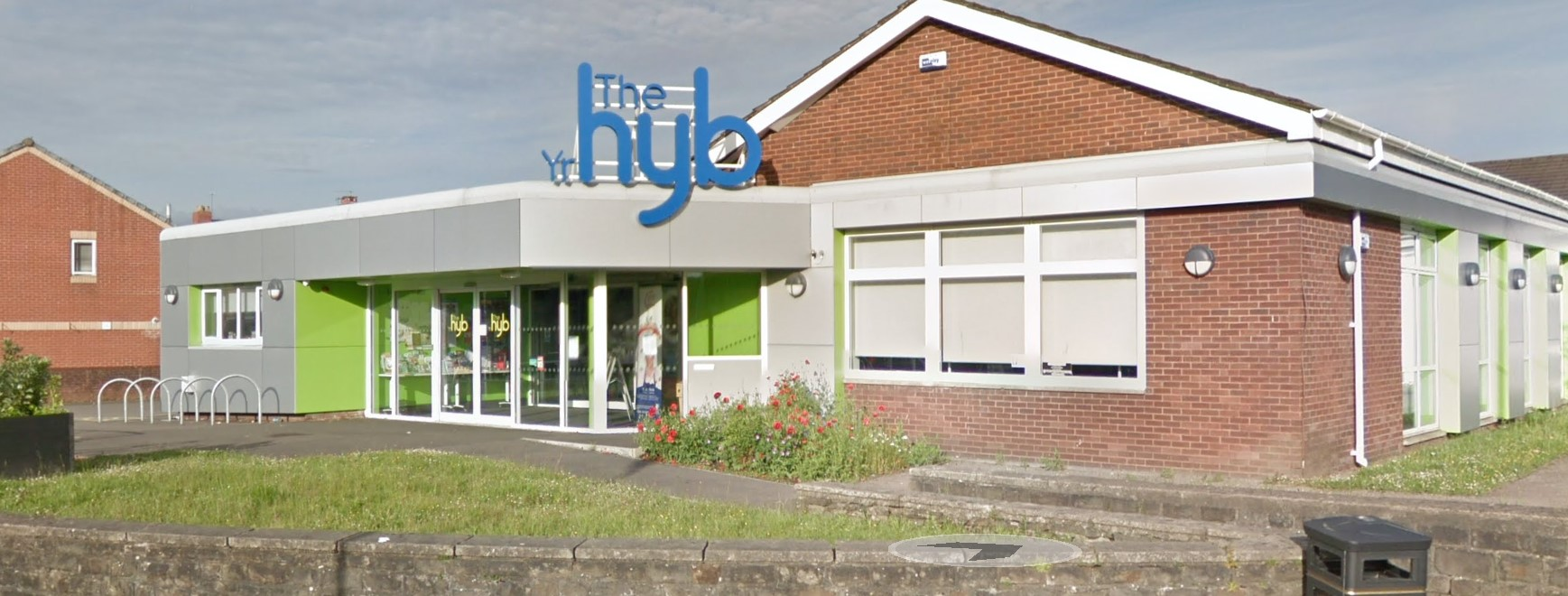
Llandaff North and Gabalfa Library

Llandaff North and Gabalfa Library (Welsh: Llyfrgell Ystum Taf a Gabalfa) is situated in Gabalfa, in the north of Cardiff. It is part of the same building as Llandaff North Day Centre on Gabalfa Avenue.

The library opened in the 1970s. It was closed from November 2007 until March 2008 for a £170,000 refurbishment which included upgrading the entrance lobby, fitting new flooring and replacing furniture and shelving.

The library offers fiction, non-fiction, talking books for adults, and a separate section for children and teenagers. The latest addition is a selection of DVDs for children and teenagers. Community information, a reference section for adults, a magazine exchange, and a photocopier are all available. There are 10 PCs with full Internet access, including two adult only PCs and two child only PCs, as well as use of self-help Internet guides such as the BBC's Webwise CDRom, and books on how to access the net. Storytimes, the Book Start project and a reading group are also offered at the library.

=== Llanedeyrn ===
Powerhouse Library Hub (Welsh: Llyfrgell a Hyb Llanedeyrn) was situated in the Maelfa shopping centre in Llanedeyrn, in eastern Cardiff, but has now moved to a new extension on the Powerhouse.

The library has seven PCs for public use, one of which is reserved for children; all have free Internet access. Sources of information include noticeboards, leaflets, local and national newspapers and the Internet. During term time the library holds a storytime with craft and rhymes for pre-school children. There are storytimes for older children during the school holidays.

=== Llanishen ===
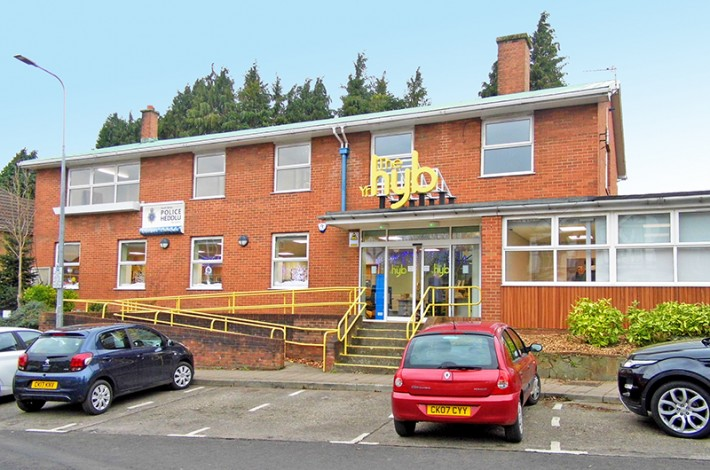
Llanishen Library Hub

Llanishen Hub (Welsh: Hyb Llanisien) is in the heart of Llanishen in northern Cardiff.

It is now located on the bottom floor of the police station in Llanishen Village, with the station remaining on the second floor but no longer with access to the public. It changed location from a shop front on Kimberley Terrace, which enabled it to open full time as well as offer other services.

The library offers most of the services of a full-time branch - fiction, non-fiction, large print and talking books for all ages. Also available are DVDs, an inter-library loan service, a community directory containing local information, four PCs with free public Internet access, and the Bookstart Scheme, offering a free book for library members under four years old.

=== Llanrumney ===
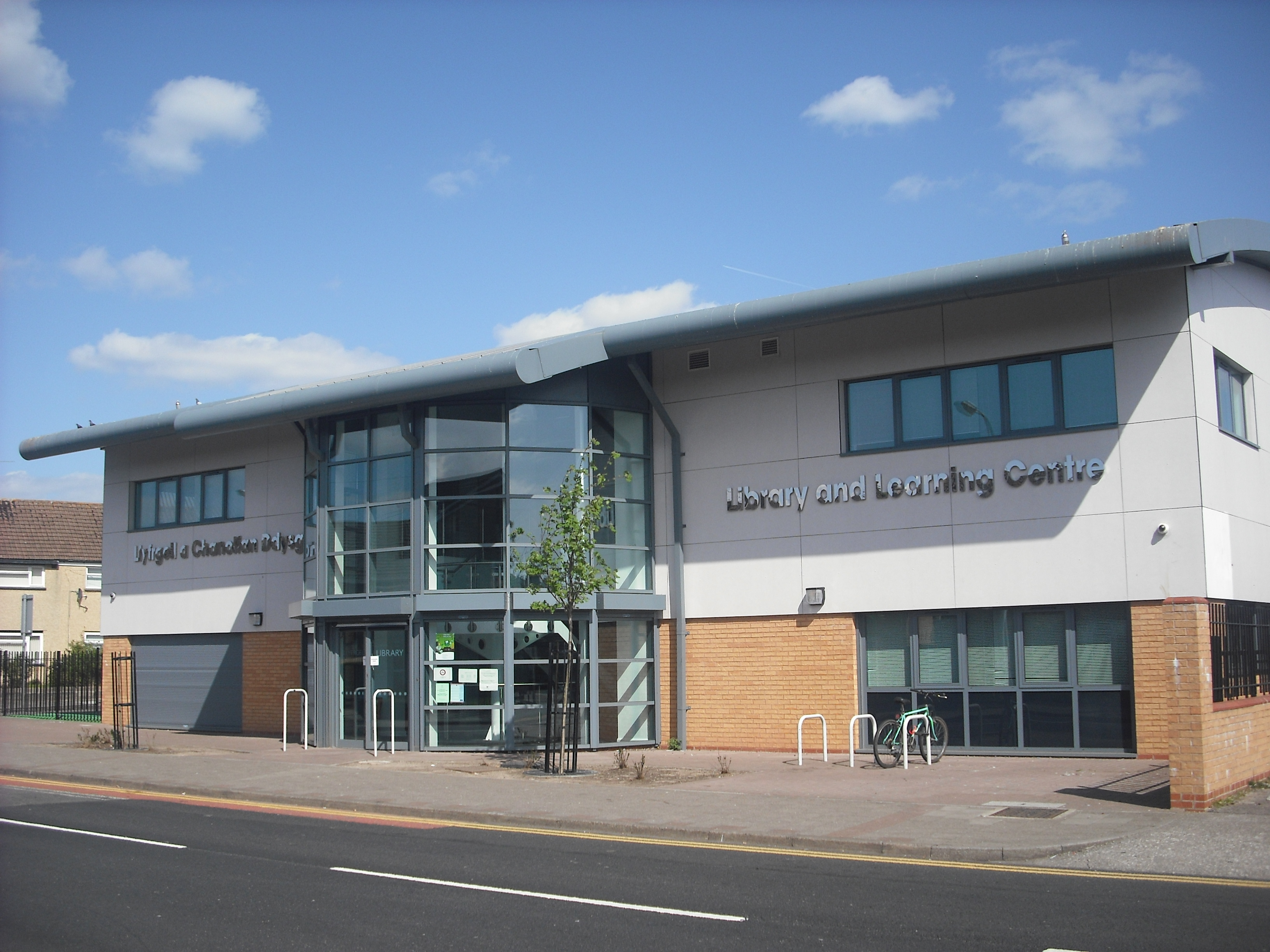
Llanrumney Library

Llanrumney Library and Learning Centre (Welsh: Llyfrgell Llanrhymni a Chanolfan Ddysgu) opened on 17 March 2008, replacing an older building on the same site, in Llanrumney, east Cardiff.

The learning and information centre consists of a two storey steelwork wind frame designed to remove the need for bracing bays due to the extensive glazing to the elevations. It was built at a cost of £1.3 million and was awarded a BREEAM Rating of Good.

The library offers a range of fiction, non-fiction, DVDs and talking books for adults. There is a separate section of children's and teenagers' books. There are 15 new public access PCs in the ICT suite which have full internet access. Free WiFi access is also available. The new facility includes a crèche, four community rooms available for hire and a bar/servery area. Storytime for children under age five and councillors' surgeries are held at the library frequently.

=== Penylan ===
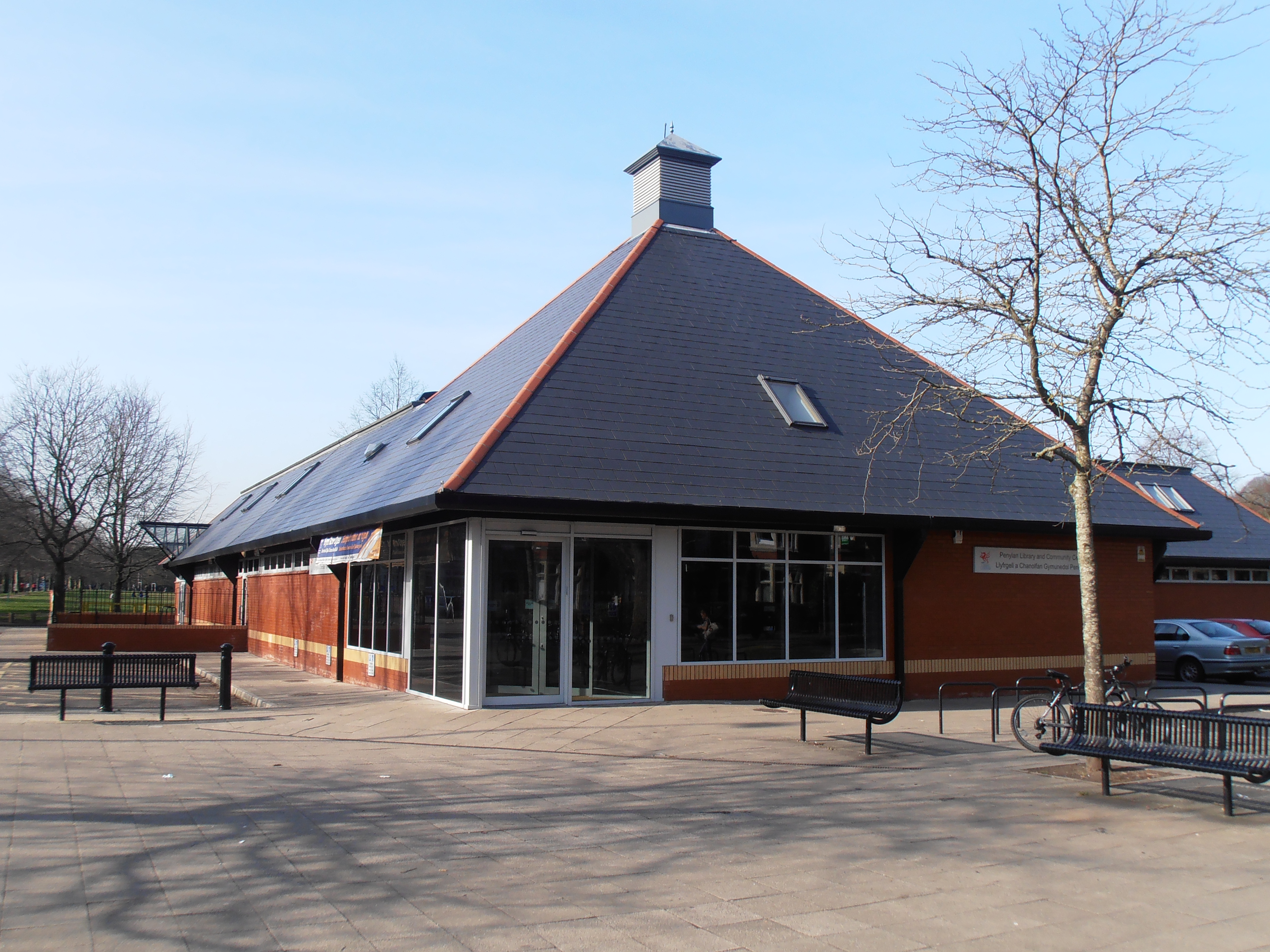
Penylan Library

Penylan Library and Community Centre (Welsh: Llyfrgell a Chanolfan Gymunedol Penylan) is situated in Penylan, in eastern Cardiff

Penylan Library opened as Roath Park Library on 18 July 1956. It reopened on 25 April 2009 after being closed for several months in order to refurbish and renovate the building, which cost £2 million to complete and saw additions of Extreme Interactive bikes and touch sensitive dance mats.

The library offers a range of fiction, non-fiction, talking books, large print items, local newspapers and a reference section, community language books and DVDs. It offers free internet access on two children's PCs, two drop in PCs, and a dedicated IT suite with a further 11 PCs. Printing and photocopying facilities are also available. The community centre has a gym with a range of interactive cardiovascular and resistance equipment, two badminton courts, a playground, a Life Trail outdoor gym and rooms available for private hire/group bookings.

The interactive room links a desire to play computer games with physical fitness. Screens that are attached to bikes and set up in front of dance mats allow up to 15 people to participate in activities together. The new bikes allow enthusiasts to virtually experience cycles through New York City, or engage in races with fellow cyclists. The interactive studio is the first of its kind in Cardiff, enabling exercise and learning in an active environment.

=== Radyr ===
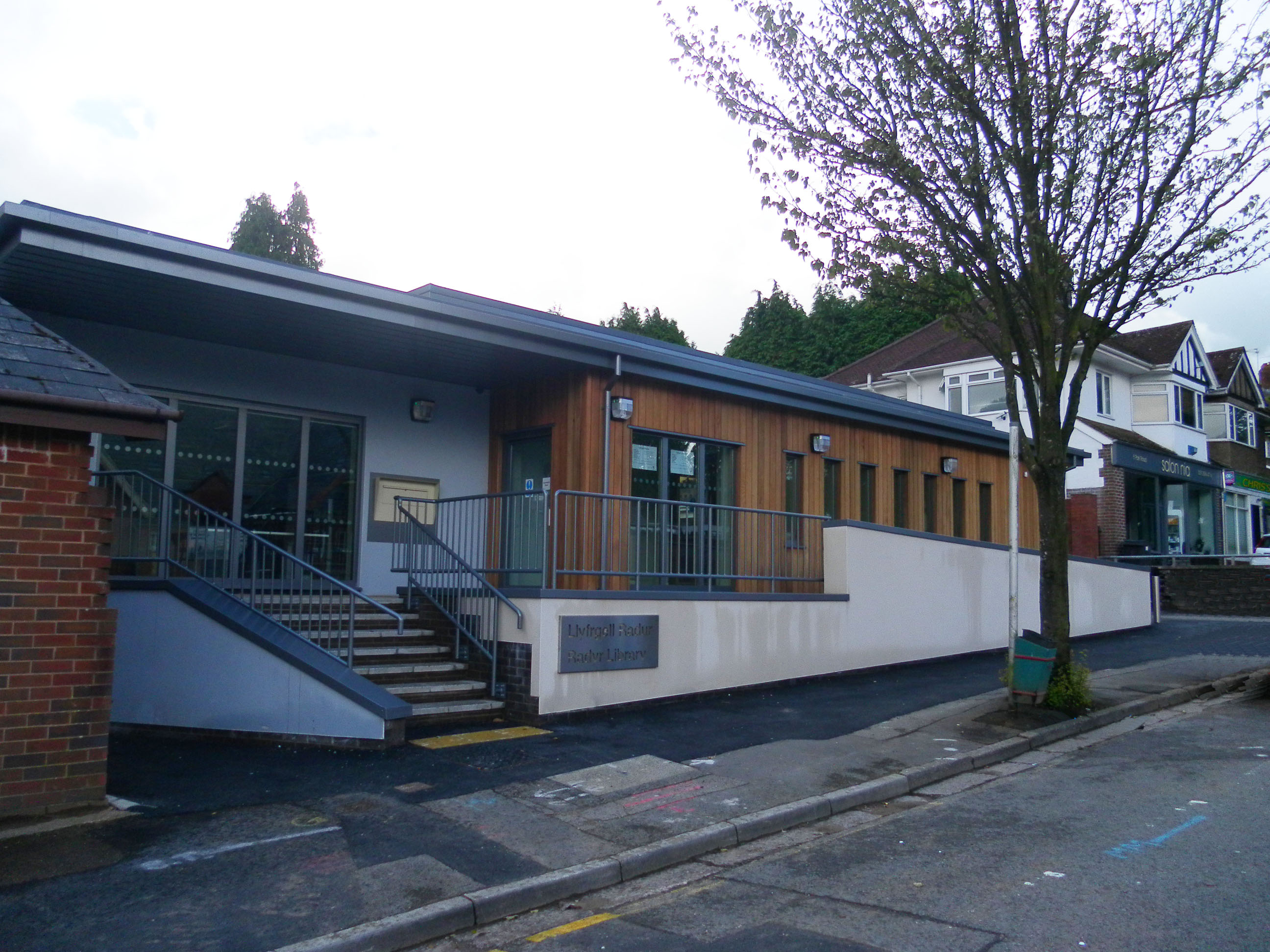
Radyr Library

Radyr Library (Welsh: Llyfrgell Radur) is a part-time library in Radyr, north west Cardiff.

There are five PCs providing free public Internet access. The library has a reference collection of books, maps and papers relating to the local area, most of which were donated by the Radyr and Morganstown Local History Society. A complete set of the local newsletter, the Radyr Chain, has been bound into volumes and can be viewed at the library. The library also holds the events diary for Radyr and Morganstown, and has information on local organisations and activities.

Children's activities include storytime for those under five, rhymetimes for babies, stories and crafts sessions for older children, language and play sessions for babies and toddlers, and a readers' group for children aged 8–12. The library holds events for adults including coffee mornings, readers' evenings and "Noson Goffi" for Welsh learners and speakers.

=== Rhiwbina ===
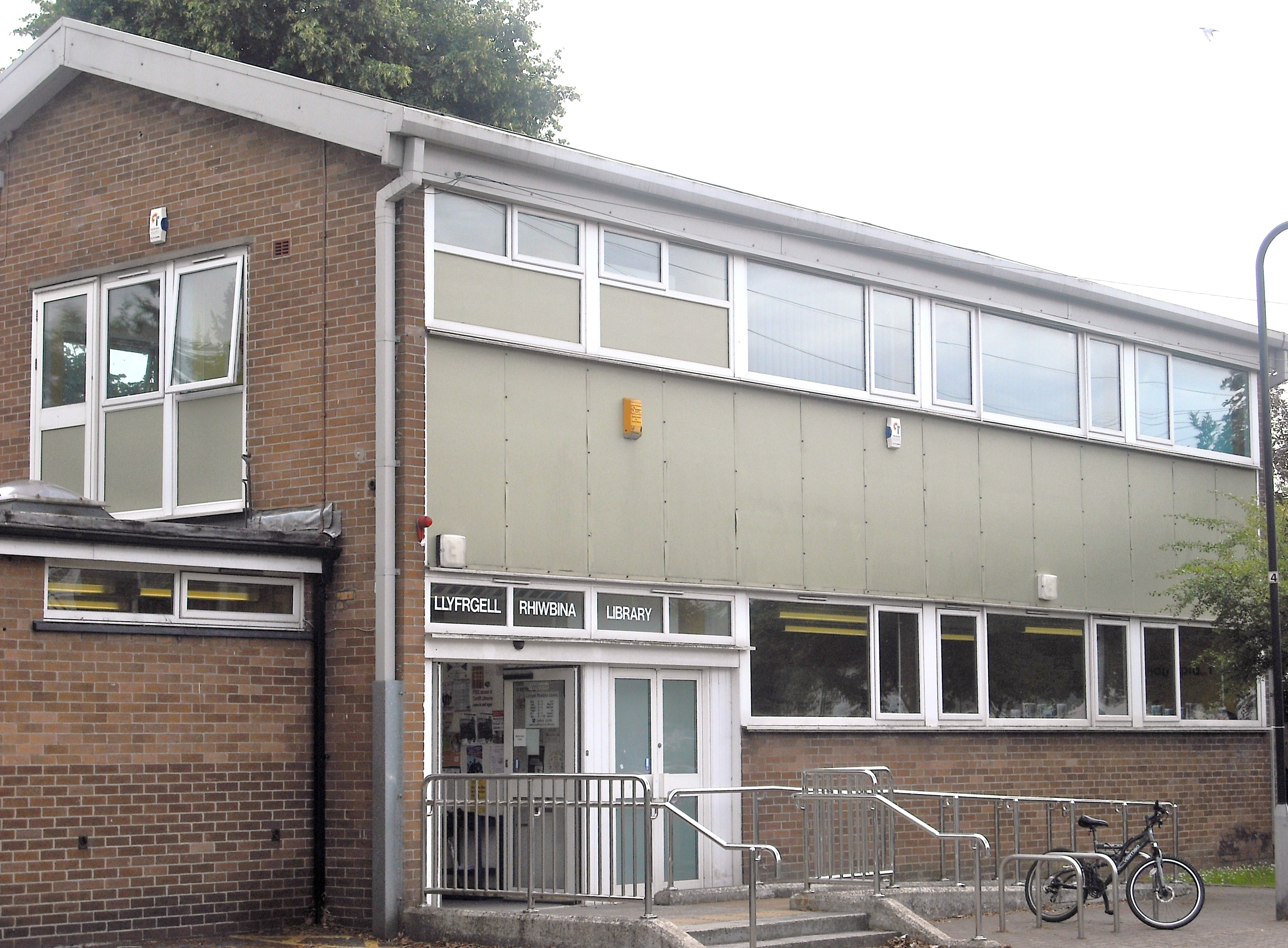
Rhiwbina Library

Rhiwbina Library (Welsh: Llyfrgell Rhiwbeina) is situated in Rhiwbina, north Cardiff.

There are four PCs with free public Internet access, and a catalogue search PC. For children, the library organises baby and toddler sessions and pre-school storytime. The library has two informal readers' groups for adults. The Jevons Room is available for hire by community groups.

=== Rhydypennau ===
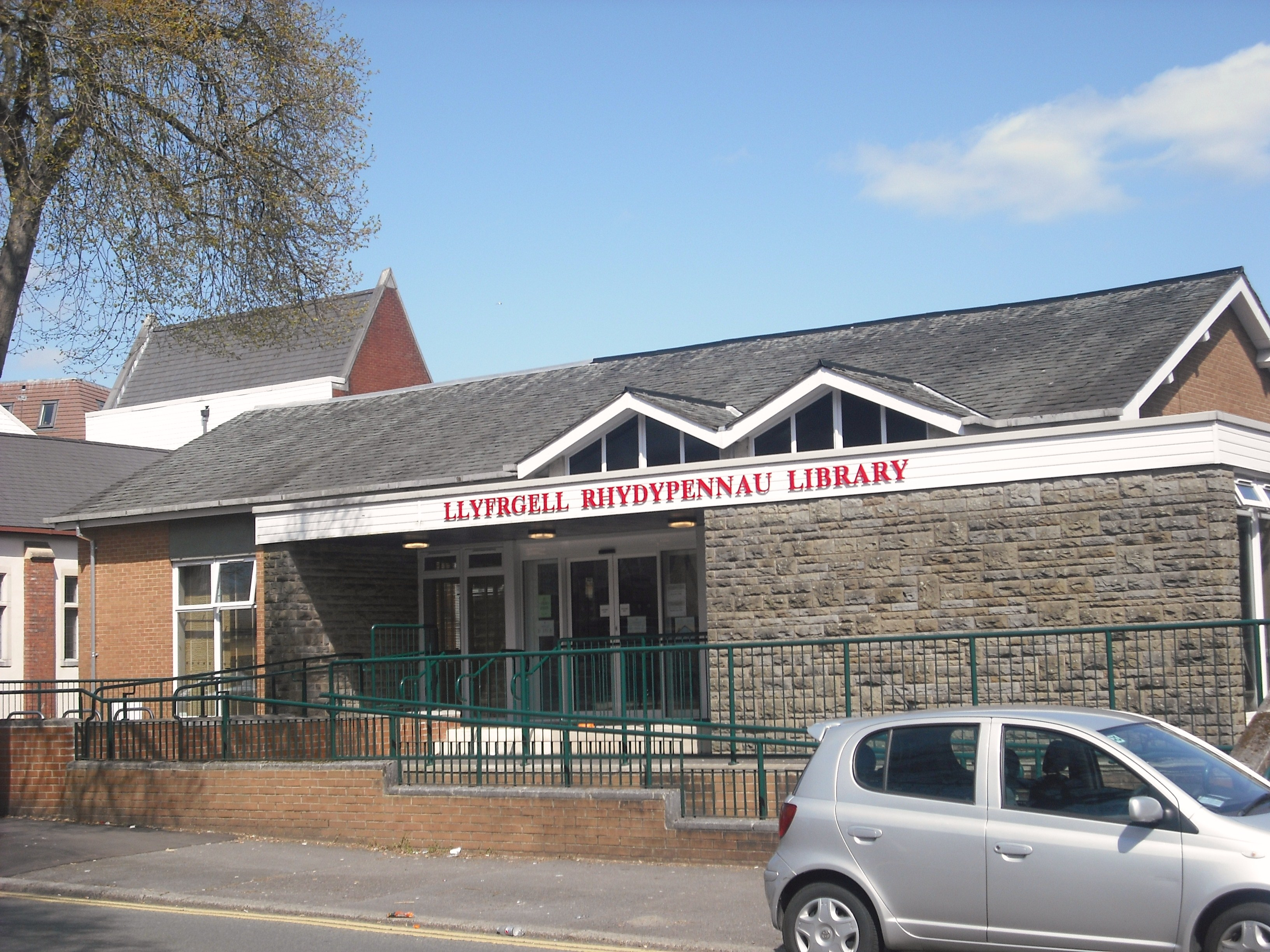
Rhydypennau Library

Rhydypennau Library (Welsh: Llyfrgell Rhydypennau) is situated near Cardiff High School in Cyncoed, north Cardiff.

The library was refurbished in 2006-2007 and again in 2019. Modifications to the entrance included the installation of automatic doors and the replacement of existing ramps. Accessible facilities for disabled people were put in place.

There are four PCs with free public Internet access and one PC in the children's section. Storytime for pre-school children followed by craft activities, and rhymetime for babies and toddlers are organised by the library. Evening events are organised by the Friends of Rhydypennau group.

=== Roath ===
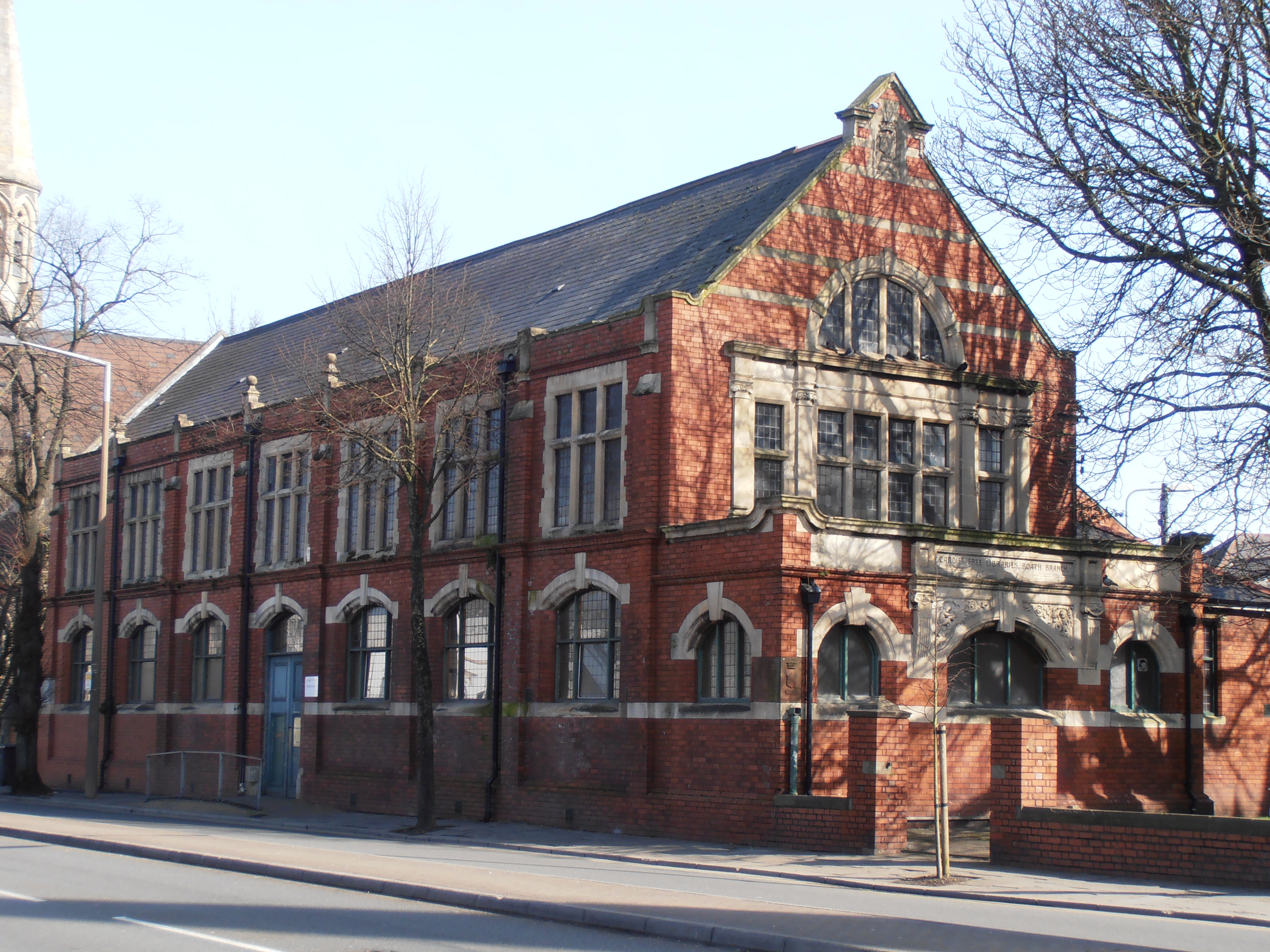
Roath Library

Roath Library (Welsh: Llyfrgell y Rhath) served the communities of Roath, Adamsdown and Splott, in south eastern Cardiff. It is a Grade II listed red brick building, ten minutes from the city centre by foot.

The library building closed in November 2014 and the service was re-located within Cardiff Royal Infirmary.

=== Rumney ===
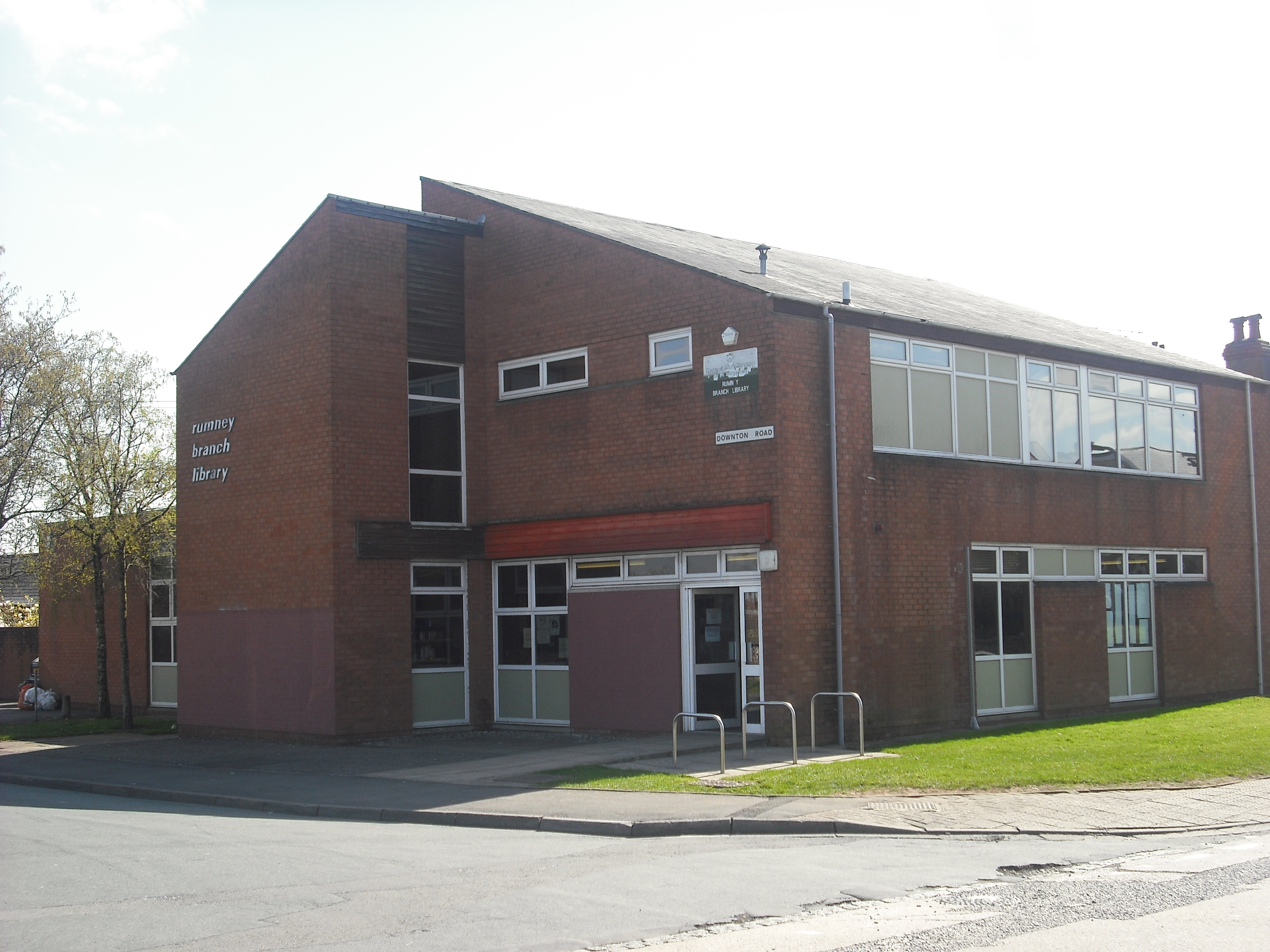
Rumney Library

Rumney Partnership Hub (Welsh: Llyfrgell Tredelerch) is located in Rumney, east Cardiff.

The library has a range of fiction, non-fiction, talking books videos, DVDs and music CDs for adults and juniors, as well as a separate section for children with books, talking books, videos and DVDs. There is also a reference and information section which includes local and national newspapers, planning applications, and local council information. Along with a selection from the Archive of Rumney and District History Society, there is a photographic history of Rumney from the late 19th century to 2000, which members of the public can access.

There are seven computer terminals with free access to the Internet and there is also one terminal in the children's area. A computer for members of the public to search the library catalogue is also available. In addition, the Rumney Family History Society has provided a computer that can be used specifically for genealogical research. Computer classes for those over 50 are held at the library covering topics such as Word Processing and Internet Use.

Rumney Library organises a weekly reading group, author visits, storytime for pre-school children and baby rhymetime sessions. The local Age Concern "Good Neighbours Scheme" is also run from the community room in the library. There is a small display area available to local community groups.

=== Splott ===
STAR Library and Hub (Welsh: Llyfgell a Hyb STAR) is situated in the STAR Centre in Splott which serves south eastern parts of the city.

In 1894 Splott became the first area of Cardiff to receive a local branch library. The old library closed in the 2000s but refurbishment began in 2015 to return it to community use. Splott Library became incorporated into the refurbished STAR Centre.

The library contains a children's area and an extended IT facility with full online services and access. The library organises a weekly reading group that is linked to a reading group in Argentina, as well as pre-school activities, half term events for school children, storytime and craft sessions, and rhymetime sessions.

In January, 2018 the Duke and Duchess of Sussex visited STAR hub as part of their visit to Cardiff.

=== St Mellons ===
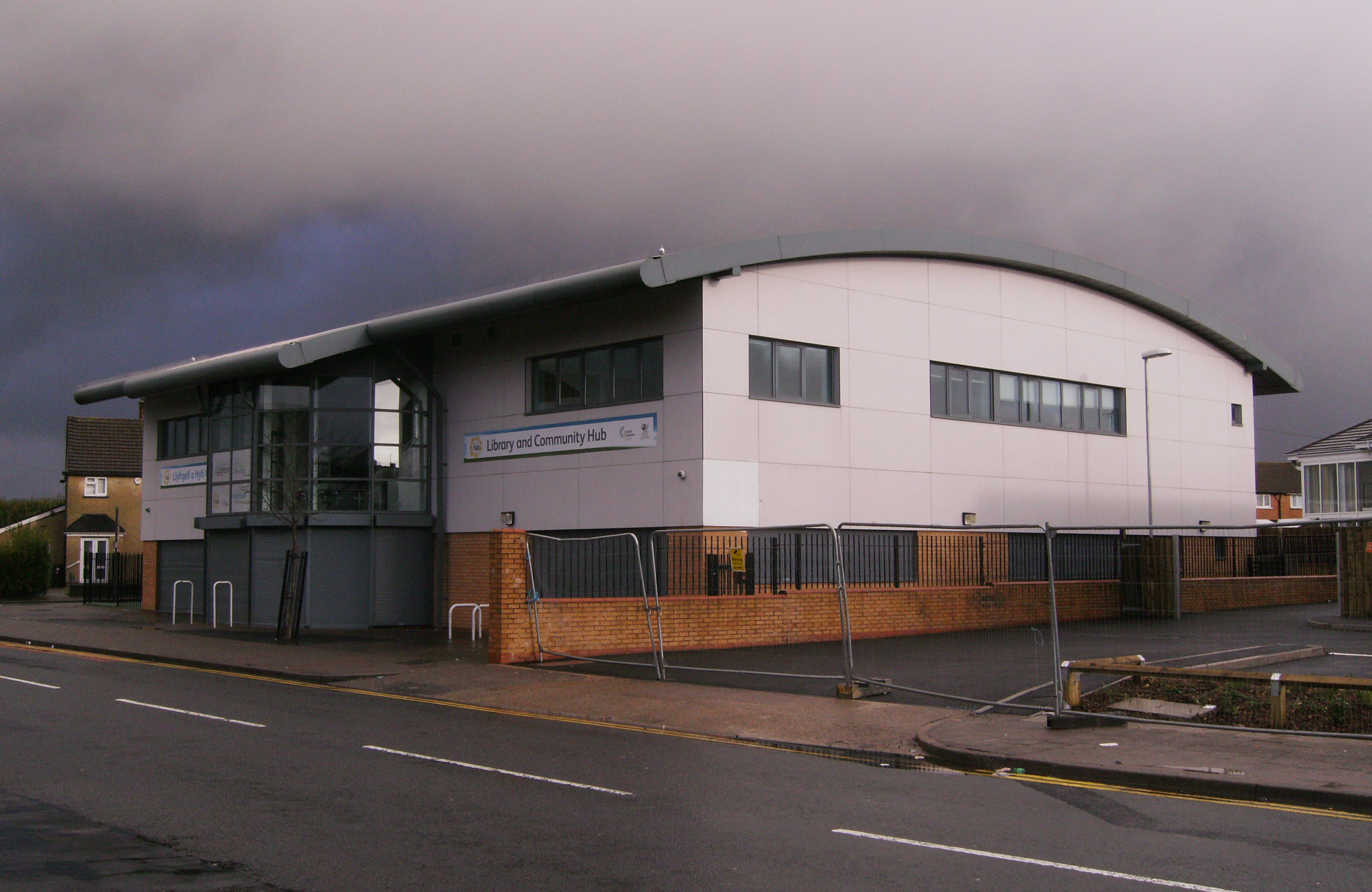
St Mellons Library and Community Hub

St Mellons Hub (Welsh: Hyb Llaneirwg) is situated next to the police station and other community buildings of St Mellons in the east of Cardiff.

The library has 16 public PC terminals offering free access to the Internet. The library holds information on local events, clubs and societies, tourist information and local transport. Daily national and local newspapers are available to read, and a photocopying service is available. The library holds pre-school story and craft sessions, baby rhymetime sessions, and free computer sessions.

=== Tongwynlais ===
Tongwynlais Library (Welsh: Llyfrgell Tongwynlais) is situated in the heart of the village of Tongwynlais in rural north west Cardiff. The library is situated near Castell Coch, a pictorial history of which is on permanent display in the building.

The building was originally opened as a tannery in the 1840s. It was used as such until the late 1920s, when it was taken over by the local community council and turned into a centre where the library has been based since the late 1980s.

Unlike most other Cardiff libraries, Tongwylais Library is only open one day a week. There are weekly storytime sessions for children under five, and visits from the local primary school. The library offers a range of fiction, large print and talking books for adults, and a special section ranging from books for babies to teenagers. There is also a small reference and homework section.

=== Whitchurch ===
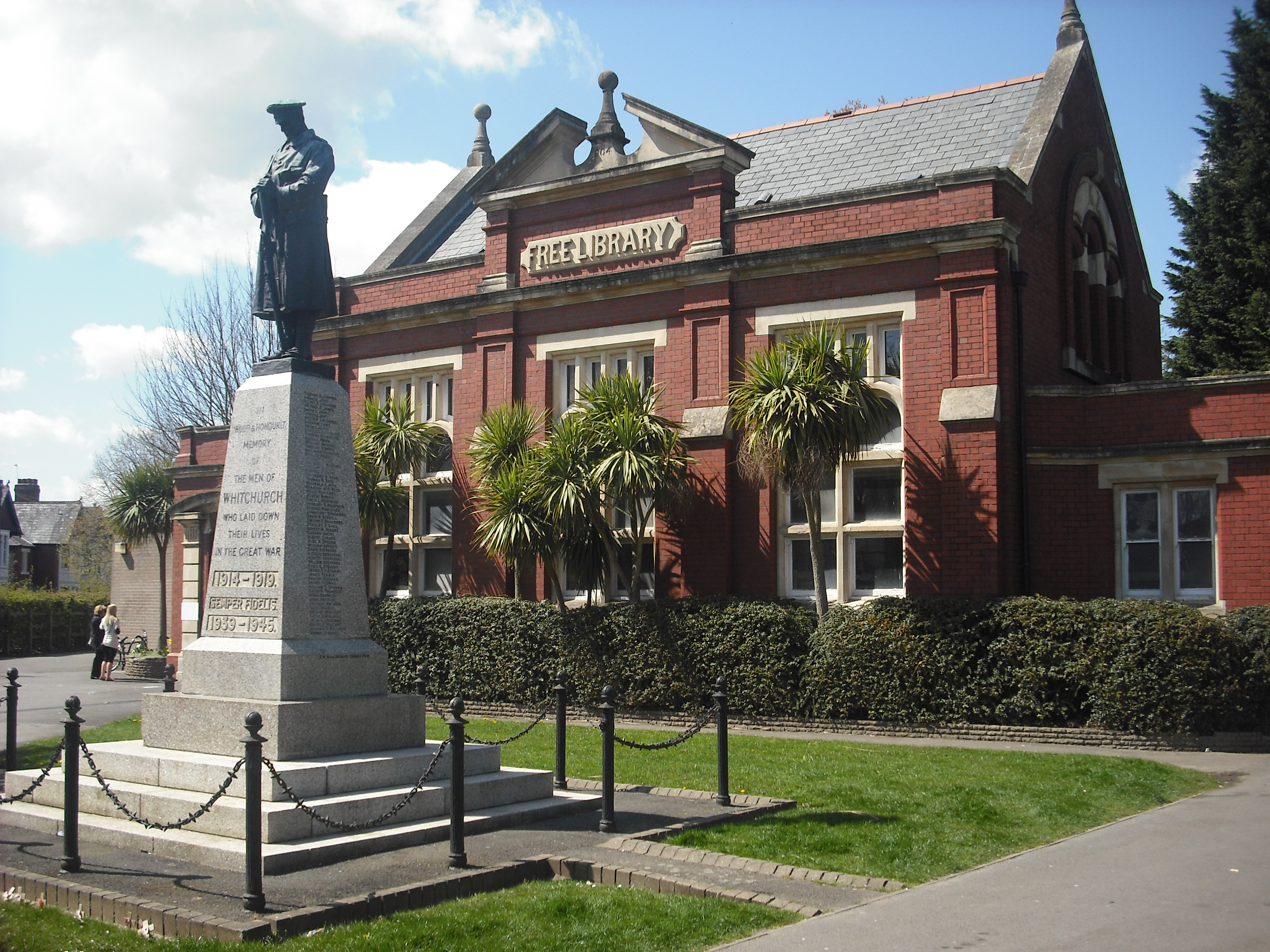
Whitchurch Library

Whitchurch Library (Welsh: Llyfrgell yr Eglwys Newydd) is situated in a busy community and shopping area of Whitchurch, north Cardiff, in the grounds of the local park.

There is an adult area away from the children's section which can be used to study any of the 20,000 stock items, reference books, newspapers or magazines. Storytime sessions, baby rhyme sessions and a book group meeting are held at the library.

A memorial plaque at the library is dedicated to John Tripp, a poet who lived in the area.

== Mobile library ==
The mobile library operates on a three week visiting schedule through two departments: the mobile library van and the Housebound Service. It visits areas of Cardiff without easy access to a local branch, new housing estates where a branch has yet to be built, and areas with a concentration of elderly or infirm people, who might struggle to reach a branch. Both the mobile library and the Housebound Service visit over thirty nursing homes and sheltered homes, sometimes providing a trolley service. The Two vehicles operate with limited stock but they share stock with all Cardiff Libraries and as such specific books can be ordered through the mobile library when they visit. The mobile library and Housebound Service are stationed in the basement of Rhydypennau Library (and are not accessible to the public).

== Libraries stacks and stock support unit ==
Cardiff Council operates a Libraries Stacks and Stock Support Unit. The unit supplies items to branch libraries which are unable to hold these items on site.

The unit also holds a legacy collection of historical manuscripts and books on behalf of Cardiff Council that were collected during the early 20th century, before the National Library was established in Aberystwyth. In 2020, Cardiff Council approved a new draft Historical Collections Policy in relation to the management of historical items owned by the council.

== See also ==
- List of cultural venues in Cardiff
- Culture and recreation in Cardiff
- List of libraries in the United Kingdom
