= Red Dragon Centre =

Entertainment complex in Cardiff, Wales

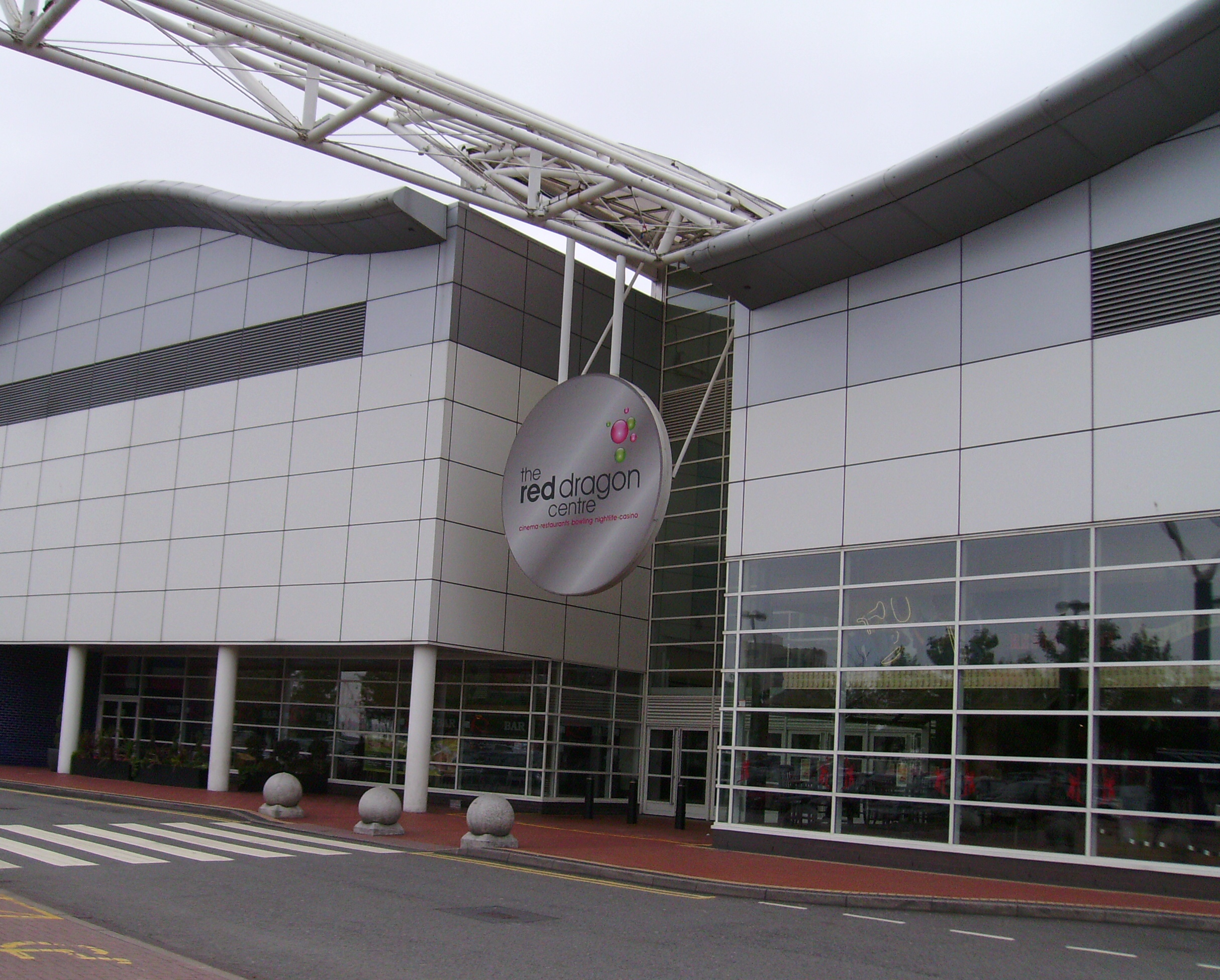
- Entrance to the Red Dragon Centre (2007)
- Former names: Atlantic Wharf Leisure Village (1997–2000)

General information
- Type: Entertainment, leisure complex
- Location: Atlantic Wharf, Cardiff Bay
- Coordinates: 51.4667°N 3.1641°W
- Opening: August 1997
- Owner: Cardiff Council (2020)

Design and construction
- Architecture firm: Holder Mathias

The Red Dragon Centre is an indoor entertainment and leisure complex in southern Cardiff, the capital of Wales. It was originally known as the Atlantic Wharf Leisure Village when it opened in August 1997. The complex features restaurants, cafés, a Hollywood Bowl bowling alley with arcade amusements, an Odeon multiplex cinema, a casino, gym and an on-site car park.

It is located in the Cardiff Bay area, opposite the Wales Millennium Centre. This is close to the A4232 and near Cardiff Bay railway station. It is directly served by Cardiff Bus routes 6 (Baycar) and 8 (via Grangetown, Central Station) to the city centre.

== History ==
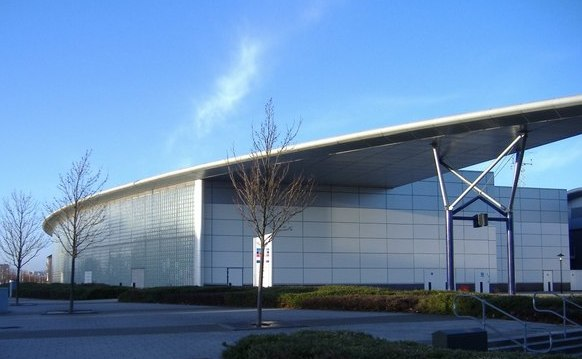
The Red Dragon Centre (rear)

The centre opened in 1997 as the Atlantic Wharf Leisure Village. The centre was renamed in 2000 as Red Dragon Centre (named after the commercial radio station for Cardiff and Newport, Red Dragon FM) Red Dragon FM has since been rebranded as Capital South Wales. The station is based in the centre, alongside Heart South Wales.

The multiplex cinema opened in October 1997 and was originally managed by United Cinemas International (UCI). However, in 2004 Odeon and UCI were bought by private equity firm, Terra Firma, and the two companies were merged under the Odeon name.

On 17 December 2019, it was announced that Cardiff Council's cabinet had been granted permission for the local authority to purchase the Red Dragon Centre from the British Airways Pension Fund (BAPF) for an undisclosed sum. An element of the purchase price would only be payable to the pension fund once a planning application had been submitted for the new arena project on any part of the multi-acre Atlantic Wharf site (the combined County Hall on Schooner Way and Red Dragon Centre on Hemingway Road) within a 10 year period. In 2020, the BAPF sold the centre to the council for a reported £60m.

=== Future plans ===
There are plans to replace the centre with a new building "in the coming years", as part of wider plans to regenerate the Atlantic Wharf area with a large mixed-use development situated on a 30 acres (12 ha) site; this would include new council offices, waterfront apartments, a replacement hotel and "immersive" arts theatre to sit alongside a new 15,000 capacity indoor arena.

== Centre tenants ==
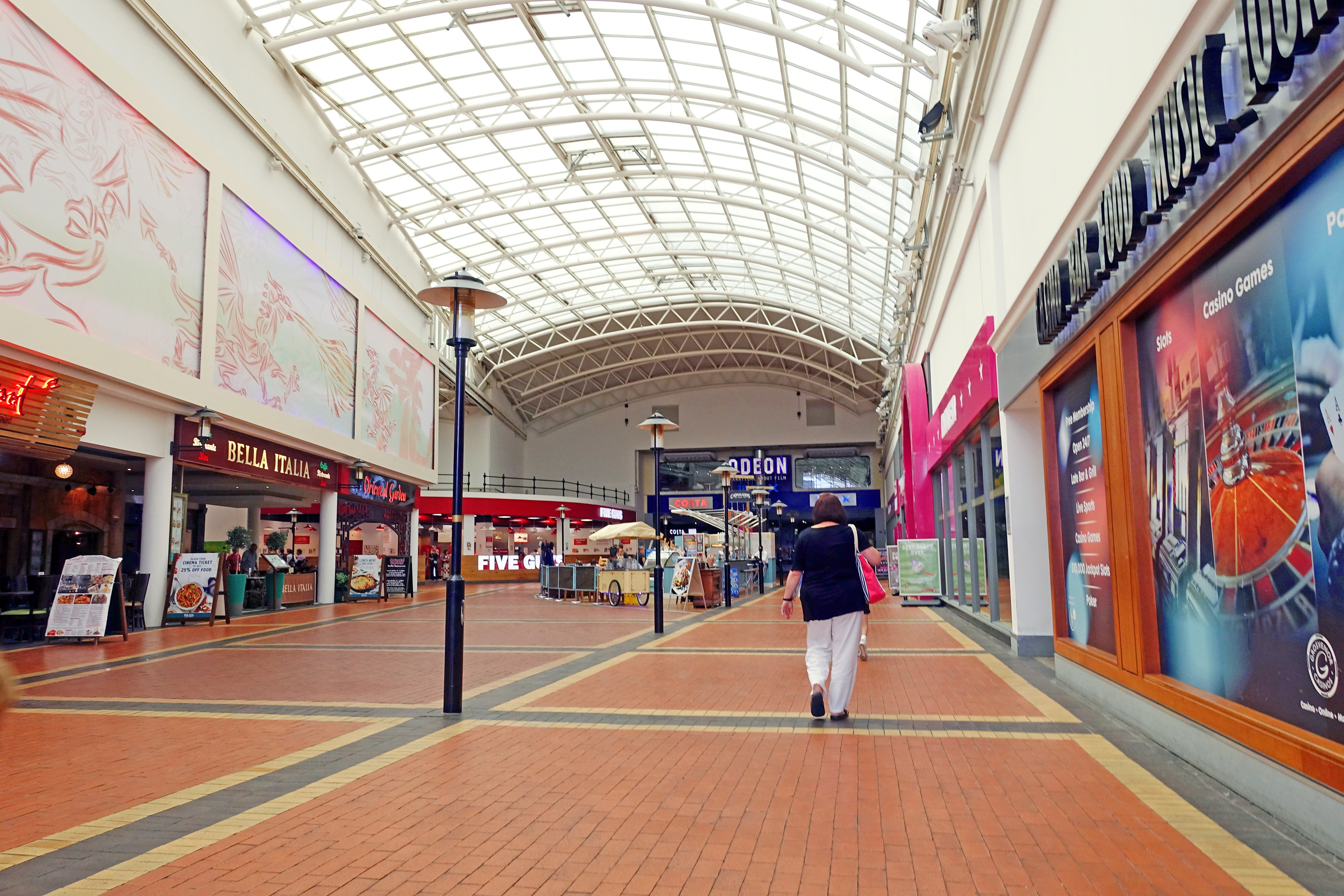
Interior in August 2018

Current tenants include:

- Grosvenor Casinos
- Bella Italia
- Cadwaladers Coffee House
- Hollywood Bowl
- Five Guys
- Odeon
- Capital South Wales
- Heart South Wales
- Travelodge

== See also ==
- List of cultural venues in Cardiff
- List of places in Cardiff
