= List of cultural venues in Cardiff =

The following cultural venues are located in Cardiff, capital city of Wales.

== Performing arts ==
Performing arts venues with seating capacity:

- City Hall, Cardiff (600)
- Chapter Arts Centre (180)
- Llanover Hall Arts Centre (100)
- New Theatre (Cardiff) (1,144)
- Royal Welsh College of Music & Drama
  - Dora Stoutzker Hall (400)
  - Richard Burton Theatre (182)
  - Bute Theatre (150–200)
  - Caird Studio (50)
  - Corus Recital Room (50)
  - S4C Studio (50)
  - Sir Geraint Evans Recital Room (60)
  - Weston Gallery (80)
- Sherman Theatre
  - Main theatre (631)
  - Studio (100)
  - Venue 3
- St David's Hall
  - Main auditorium (up to 1,956)
  - Level 3 Day Stage (or "Level 3 Bar") (350 including standing)
- Wales Millennium Centre (Canolfan Mileniwm Cymru)
  - Dance Space (100)
  - Donald Gordon Theatre (1,897)
  - Urdd Hall (153)
  - Weston Studio (250)
  - Cabaret (140)
  - BBC Hoddinott Hall (350)
  - Capella Production Studio and Theatre (proposed) (550)
- Roald Dahl Plass (Outdoor Arena)

== Entertainment venues ==
- Cardiff University Students' Union
- Mermaid Quay
- Stadium Plaza
- Cardiff International Arena
  - New Cardiff Bay Arena (proposed)
- Red Dragon Centre
- The Glee Club

== Live music venues ==
- Barfly (200) - opened in 2001, closed in September 2010
- Clwb Ifor Bach
- Coal Exchange (1,000) - Venue closed in 2007, reopened in 2009 and closed again in 2013 because of safety concerns.
- Fuel Rock Club, Cardiff- (160) opened 2013
- The Globe (350) - opened on Albany Road, Roath, in November 2008.
- Inkspot Venue Cardiff - conference rooms, live music events
- The Moon Club, Womanby Street
- The Point (500) - closed in January 2009, following a single complaint from a neighbour about noise.
- Tiny Rebel, Cardiff- (80–100) opened 2013, function room upstairs is often used for live music
- Tramshed (1000) - opened in October 2015 in a converted Grade II listed tram depot in Grangetown.
- Y Plas - in the Cardiff University Students' Union building in Cathays

== Gay venues ==
Cardiff has number of gay venues in the city, particularly in the area around Charles Street and Churchill Way. Gay-friendly venues include:

- Golden Cross - a pub featuring regular drag acts
- Kings Cross, The Hayes - gay-friendly pub for over 35 years, converted to a gastropub in 2011

== Historic and architectural venues ==
This is a list of historic and architectural places and their use as a cultural venue:

- Cardiff Bay and Cardiff Barrage (has hosted open-air concerts)
- Bute Park (used for open-air concerts and festivals)
- Cardiff Castle (has hosted open-air concerts, a professional boxing match and small exhibitions)
- Castell Coch (has hosted a celebrity renewal of wedding vows)

== Museums and art galleries ==
- National Museum and Gallery, Cathays Park

=== Museums ===
- Museum of Welsh Life, St Fagans
- Cardiff Story
- Welsh Regiment Museum

=== Art galleries ===
- Albany Gallery, Roath - established 1965
- Blackwater Gallery, Prospect Place, Cardiff
- Butetown History and Arts Centre (closed 2016), Cardiff Bay
- Oriel Canfas, Canton - run by artists who were formerly based at the Old Library in Cardiff city centre until the late 1990s
- Cardiff MADE, Roath
- Gallery Celf, Bangor Street, Roath
- Norwegian Church Arts Centre, Cardiff Bay
- g39 - artist run gallery, opened 1998 in the city centre and relocated to a larger space off City Road, Roath in 2011.
- tactileBOSCH, Llandaff
- Third Floor Gallery (2010–2016), Cardiff Bay

== Libraries ==
- Canton Library
- Cathays Library
- Central Library
- Ely Library
- Fairwater Library
- Grangetown Library
- Llandaff North Library
- Llanedeyrn Library
- Llanishen Library
- Llanrumney Library
- Penylan Library
- Radyr Library
- Roath Library (closed in 2014)
- Rhiwbina Library
- Rhydypennau Library
- Rumney Library
- Splott Library
- St Mellons Library
- Tongwynlais Library
- Whitchurch Library

== See also ==
- Art in Cardiff
- Culture and recreation in Cardiff
- List of places in Cardiff
- List of places in Wales
