= County Hall, Cardiff =

County building in Cardiff, Wales

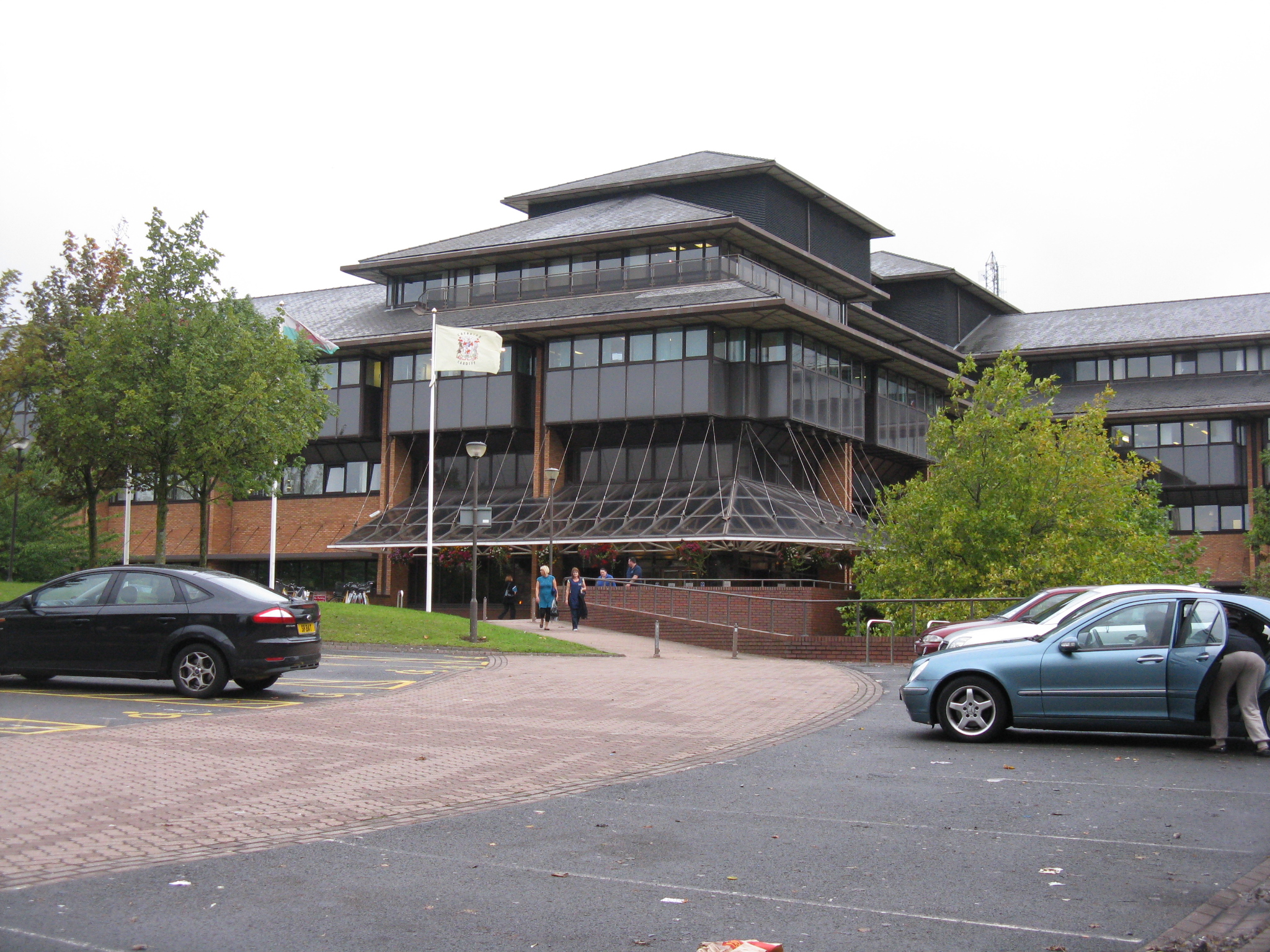
- County Hall main entrance (2010)

- Location within Cardiff

General information
- Location: Bute East Dock, Atlantic Wharf, Butetown, Cardiff, United Kingdom
- Coordinates: 51.46956°N 3.16326°W
- Completed: 1987

Design and construction
- Architect: J. R. C. Bethell

The County Hall (Welsh: Neuadd y Sir) is a municipal building located beside the disused Bute East Dock in the Atlantic Wharf area of Butetown, Cardiff. Initially the home of South Glamorgan County Council, it is now the headquarters of Cardiff Council.

== History ==
=== Design and construction ===
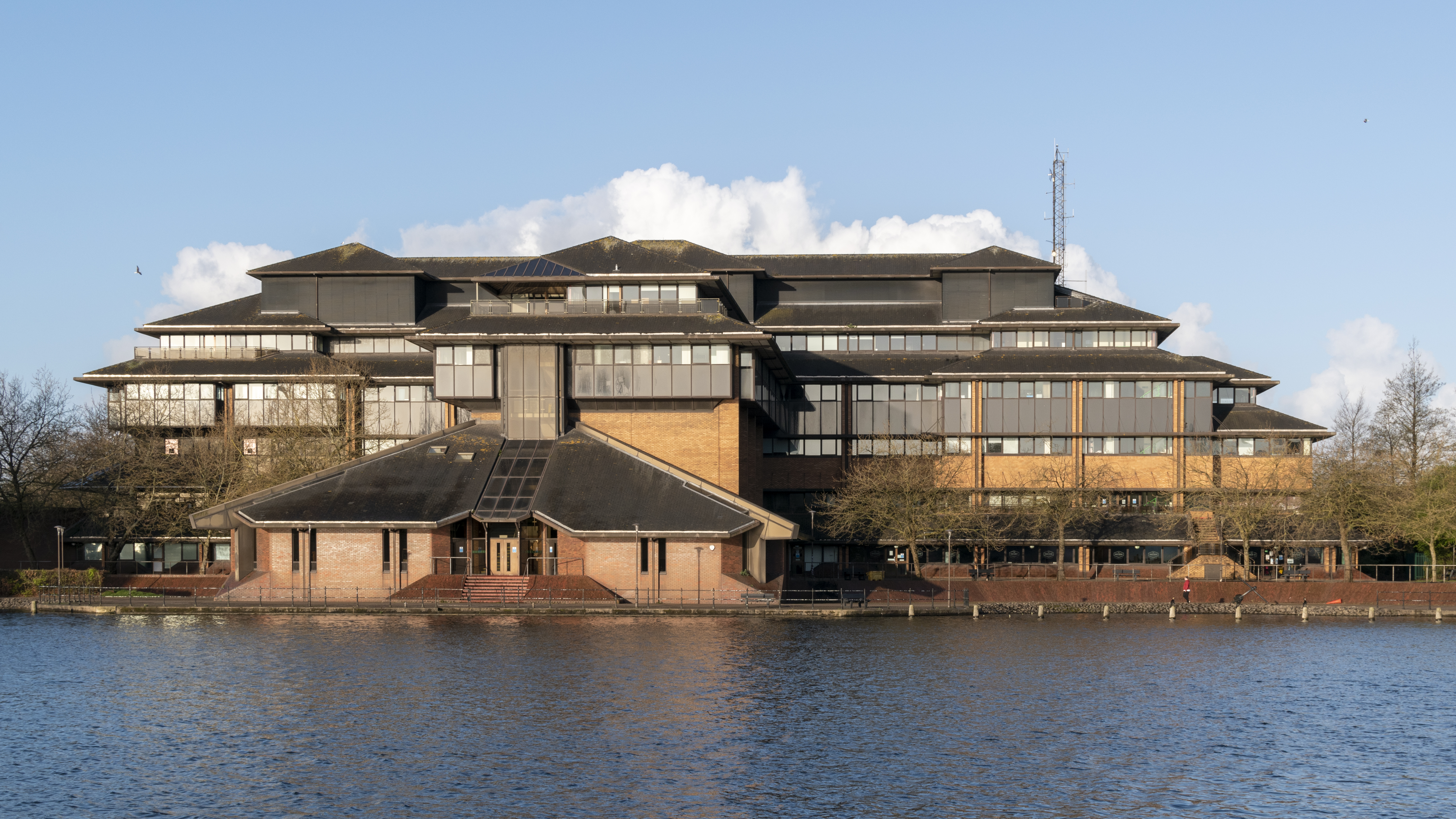
Rear elevation of County Hall

Following the implementation of the Local Government Act 1972, which broke up Glamorgan County Council and established South Glamorgan County Council, the new county council was initially headquartered in a building on Newport Road, Cardiff. After finding this arrangement inadequate for their needs, the new county leaders decided to procure a purpose-built county hall: the site they selected was derelict land on the west side of Bute East Dock.

The building was designed by J. R. C. Bethell, the County Architect for South Glamorgan, and built between 1986 and 1987. This was at a time when the surrounding area consisted mainly of post-industrial dereliction. Hence the construction of the new building has been described in Buildings of Wales: Glamorgan as a "remarkable gesture of faith [by] the South Glamorgan County Council". It is seen as representative of a new form of civic building that does not dominate its surroundings by its size, or formal language, to the extent that it could "even [be] a deliberate abregation of the arrogant assertiveness of the late C19, expressed across the water". It was officially opened by Lord Callaghan in October 1988.

The building won the National Eisteddfod of Wales Gold Medal for Architecture in 1991.

Comparable buildings, such as the British Library (1982–1999) and Hillingdon Civic Centre (1973–1978) have subsequently received heritage listings, though an application to Cadw to list County Hall in 2024 was unsuccessful.

=== Proposed disposal and demolition ===
On 1 April 1996, under the Local Government (Wales) Act 1994, South Glamorgan County Council was broken up; Cardiff Council became the local authority in the area and took over County Hall. In September 2007, former Council chief executive Byron Davies unveiled plans for large efficiency improvements and additional funding, which could include selling County Hall, the Cardiff Heliport and up to 40% of Cardiff Bus. In 2013, the potential sale and demolition of County Hall was again raised, as part of Cardiff Council's plans to reduce their property commitments. It was suggested an indoor arena and convention centre could be built on the site. In 2023, the council invited expressions of interest in a mixed-use development of 30 acres (12 ha) in the Atlantic Wharf area, to sit alongside a proposed 17,000-seat arena.

In October 2024, it was reported that a proposed new building would be one third of the size and located on land in front of the old offices which would not be demolished until the new headquarters was operational. The demolition work would create space for about five new plots of land which would be earmarked for social housing and private offices. In February 2025, it was reported that Goldbeck Construction would build the new headquarters. Its design, which also incorporates the Wales Millennium Centre's proposed digital and immersive arts theatre, was revised in August 2026.

== Architecture and use ==
County Hall is generally three storeys in height, but rises to four and five storeys in places. Its distinctive shallow pitch roofs are of black slate. The building is formed around a central courtyard. It has 24,000 square metres of council accommodation and office space.

It is the main headquarters of Cardiff Council and is home to many of the council's departments. Internally, the principal rooms are the council chamber and committee rooms. The building also houses the council's Camera Control Room, in which CCTV is used to monitor locations across the city in an attempt to stop fly-tipping and other criminal activity.

County Hall is also marketed as a venue for conferences, weddings and other events. It has an in-house catering team, a bar for refreshments and function suites to accommodate up to 300 people.
