= Atlantic Wharf =

Area of south Cardiff, Wales

Coordinates: 51.4730°N 3.1649°W

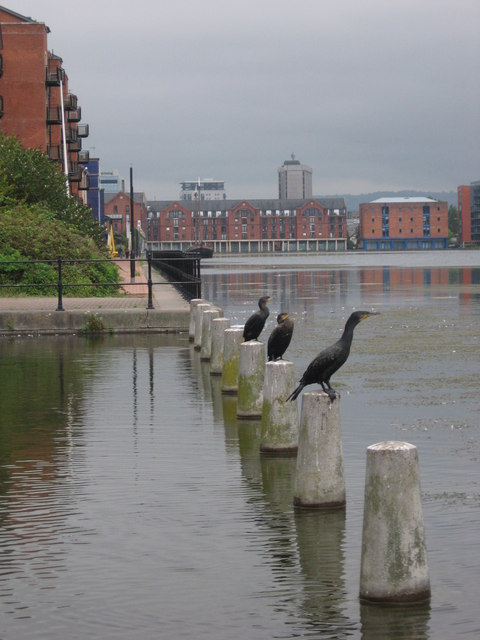
Atlantic Wharf and Bute East Dock

Atlantic Wharf (Welsh: Glanfa'r Iwerydd) is a southern area of the city of Cardiff, Wales. It is primarily an area of new houses and apartments located on the west side of the disused Bute East Dock and to the east of Lloyd George Avenue. It also includes a number of refurbished dock warehouses, modern hotels, the Red Dragon Centre and Cardiff Council's County Hall. Atlantic Wharf lies in the Butetown electoral division of Cardiff and the Cardiff South and Penarth constituency for the UK Parliament and the Senedd.

== History ==
The Bute East Dock (originally called the East Bute Dock) was constructed to ease pressure on the existing Bute Dock in the 1850s. It was opened by the 12-year-old Third Marquess of Bute on 14 September 1859. The new dock was 1,310 m in length and up to 152m wide. It was surrounded by railway sidings and large warehouses. Eventually the Bute East Dock was closed in 1970. The railway sidings were removed.

Only after 1980 did redevelopment begin around the disused dock. The Cardiff Bay Development Corporation was set up in the late 1980s to drive regeneration of the Docks area. Atlantic Wharf grew to include housing, new businesses, hotels and the conversion of three large derelict dock warehouses in the close vicinity of Bute East Dock. In 1988 the County Council built a new council headquarters building at Atlantic Wharf to reinforce the regeneration initiatives. It has been described as a "remarkable gesture of faith [by] the South Glamorgan County Council".

A new multiplex cinema and leisure complex was built nearby, known as Atlantic Wharf Leisure Village (now the Red Dragon Centre). Collingdon Road was landscaped and redeveloped to form a mile-long boulevard to Cardiff Bay. Work was completed in 2000 and the road was renamed Lloyd George Avenue.

=== 21st century ===
With approximately 1,500 houses and flats and no representative of its own on Cardiff Council, in 2016 the Atlantic Wharf Residents’ Association demanded that Atlantic Wharf be made into a separate electoral ward. There are also plans to regenerate the area with a large mixed-use development situated on a 30 acres (12 ha) site; this would include new council offices, waterfront apartments, a replacement leisure complex, hotel and "immersive" arts theatre to sit alongside a new 15,000 capacity indoor arena.

== 'Little Ireland' ==
The district of Newtown was constructed on the initiative of the Marquess of Bute in the mid-1800s to provide housing for the labourers who were building the new docks. The area consisted of six streets in the far north edge of what is now Atlantic Wharf. The streets were occupied mainly by Irish immigrants from Cork. Over 100 years after its creation, the buildings of Newtown were subject to compulsory purchase and were demolished in 1970 for redevelopment. The area eventually became an industrial estate next to the mainline railway.

== Notable buildings ==
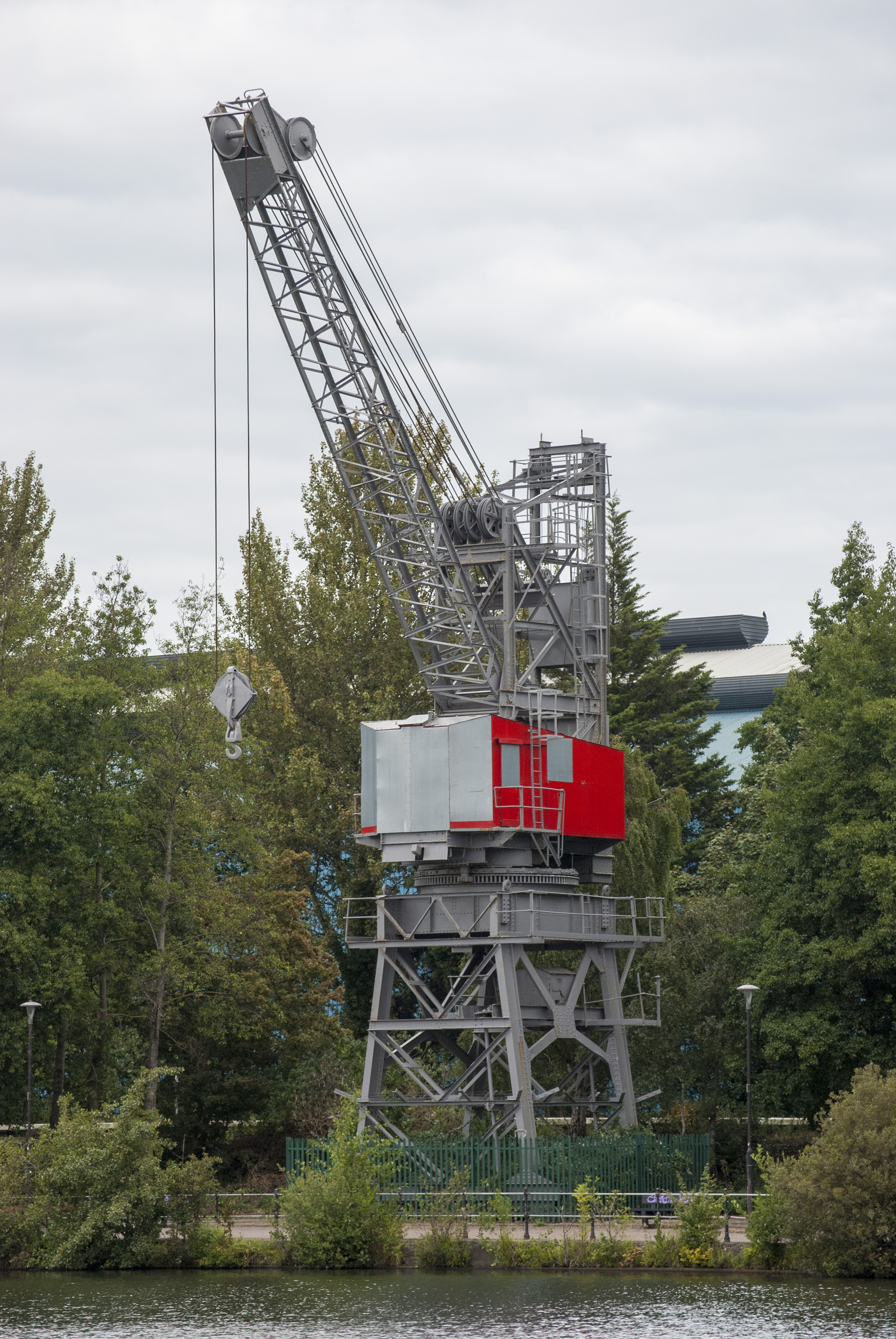
The unused quayside crane in Atlantic Wharf.

- The Bonded Warehouse – Built in 1861 at the head of Bute East Dock using a frame of cast iron columns, in classical proportions. Grade II listed. Now converted into offices for an architecture practice.
- Spillers & Bakers building (Schooner Way) – Mill and warehouse building constructed by milling company Spillers in 1887. Grade II listed. Now converted into luxury apartments.
- The Bute Docks Feeder canal runs through the area. Two of the original 1850s bridges have Grade II listed status.
- County Hall (Atlantic Wharf) – Headquarters of Cardiff Council, built 1986–1987 and officially opened in October 1988 by Lord Callaghan.
- Red Dragon Centre (Hemingway Road) – Leisure complex including a 12-screen cinema, bowling alley and restaurants.
- The quayside crane, built in 1933 by Messrs. Stothert & Pitt Ltd., was built for the Great Western Railway Company and was last used in January 1987.
