= Portland House, Cardiff =

Former bank building in Cardiff, Wales

Portland House
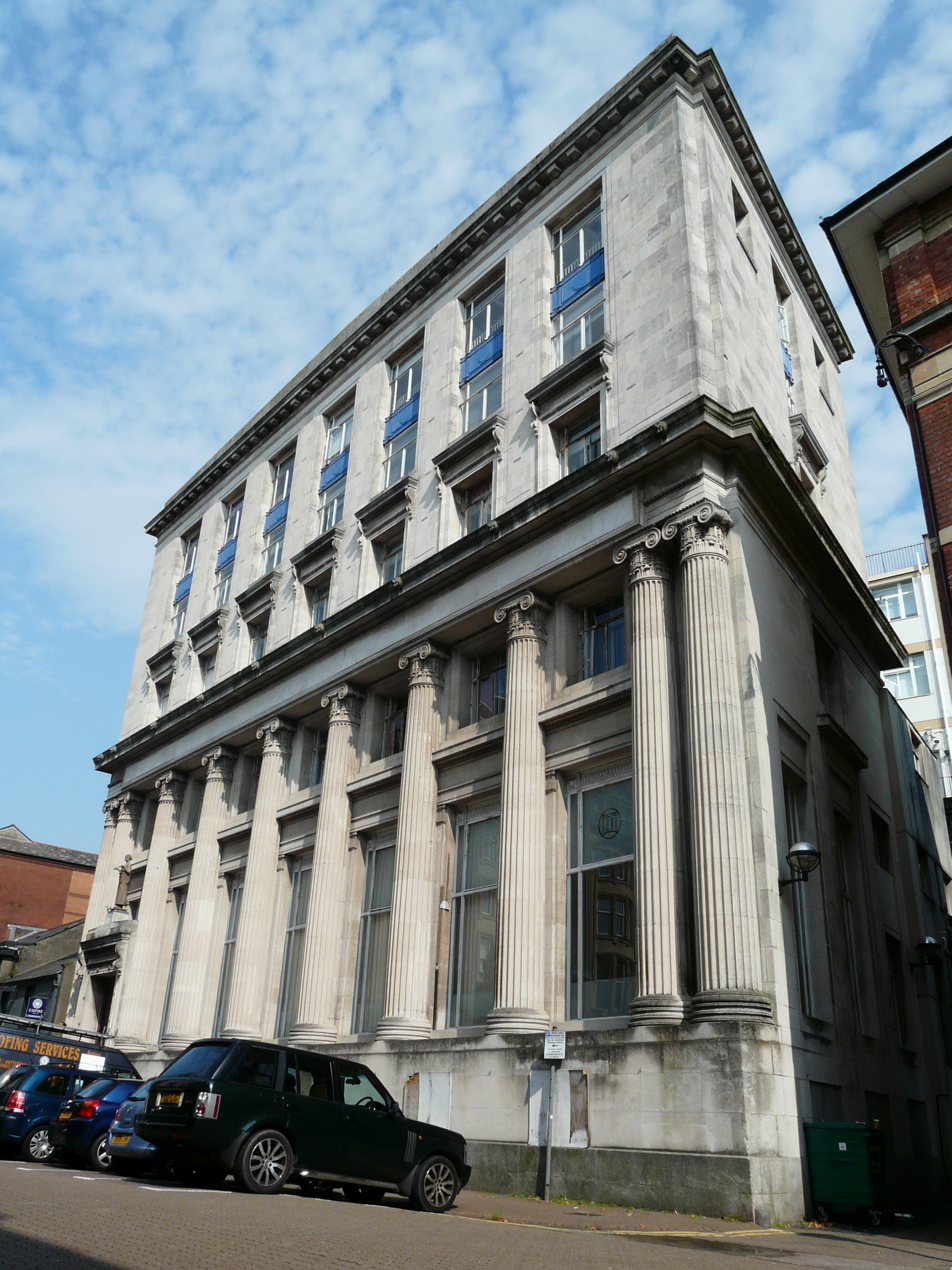
- "amongst the finest of its style in Wales"

- Location within Cardiff
- 51.4655°N 3.1664°W
- Type: Former bank, now events venue
- Location: Butetown, Cardiff, Glamorgan

History
- Built: 1926-1927

Site notes
- Architect(s): F. C. R. Palmer and W. F. C. Holden
- Architectural style: Neo-Georgian
- Owner: Privately owned

Listed Building – Grade II*
- Official name: Portland House
- Designated: 25 January 1966
- Reference no.: 13974

Portland House, Bute Street is a former bank building in Butetown, Cardiff, Wales. Completed in 1927, the building was designed for the National Provincial Bank by their in-house architectural team, F. C. R. Palmer and W. F. C. Holden. Cadw considers it "amongst the finest of its style in Wales". Portland House is a Grade II* listed building. After a period of near dereliction, it was converted to an events venue in the early 21st century.

== History ==
The area of Butetown was developed from the early 19th century by John Crichton-Stuart, 2nd Marquess of Bute, and by his son, the 3rd marquess. Together they constructed the docks which enabled the export of iron and coal from the South Wales Valleys. While the docks themselves were not especially profitable, the enormous increases in the tonnage of iron, steel and coal exported through them made the Butes immensely wealthy. (Note: A further factor contributing to the growth of the Bute fortune was the increases in ground rent they were able to demand. Owning much of central Cardiff, and almost all of the Butetown area, the development of the city brought them great wealth. An example was the lease of the land on which the Cardiff Coal Exchange was built, on what was then a garden square but was re-fashioned as Mount Stuart Square, to the west of Bute Street. This specified rent of one peppercorn "for the first three years, the following two years £100, the next year £200, the following four years £700, and thereafter £1000 a year for the duration of the [99-year] lease".) (Note: Lord Bute's ambition to have Mount Stuart Square rival Belgrave Square in London as a desirable address for the rich and titled was not entirely fulfilled. When its pair, Loudoun Square was nearing completion, The Cardiff and Merthyr Guardian reported on Butetown as being; "increasingly vile and abominable... keepers of public houses and brothels are obtaining possession...Cardiff is gaining a world-wide reputation as the most immoral of seaports".) Portland House was built in 1926-1927 for the National Provincial Bank. It stands on Bute Street to the east of Mount Stuart Square. The architects were F. C. R. Palmer and W. F. C. Holden, who formed the bank's in-house architectural team. The docks traffic was already in decline and Portland House was the last major commercial building to be constructed in Butetown.

After a period of near dereliction at the end of the 20th century, Portland House was converted into an events venue in the early 21st.

== Architecture and description ==
The bank was constructed with a steel frame set onto a base of reinforced concrete. The whole is faced with Portland stone. It is of seven bays and five storeys. The first two storeys form the main bank and are fronted by a row of "giant fluted Ionic columns". The architectural historian John Newman, in his Glamorgan volume in the Pevsner Buildings of Wales series, wrote of the building's "extraordinary magniloquence". Cadw considers Portland House "amongst the finest of its style in Wales". It is a Grade II* listed building.

== Sources ==
- Davies, John (1981). Cardiff and the Marquesses of Bute. Cardiff, UK: University of Wales Press. ISBN 978-0-708-32463-9.
- Newman, John (1995). Glamorgan. The Buildings of Wales. London, UK: Penguin Books. ISBN 978-0-140-71056-4. OCLC 33858574.
