= List of streets and squares in Cardiff =

This list of streets and squares in Cardiff, Wales, includes notable outdoor thoroughfares and formal public spaces in the city.

== Roads ==
- Cathedral Road, Pontcanna
- City Road, Plasnewydd
- Cowbridge Road East and Cowbridge Road West, the main road to the west
- Newport Road, the main road to the east

== Streets ==
- Bute Street, Butetown (Cardiff Bay)
- Caroline Street, city centre, also known as Chip Alley or Chippy Lane.
- Lloyd George Avenue, Atlantic Wharf (Cardiff Bay)
- St. Mary Street, city centre
- The Hayes, city centre
- West Grove, Roath
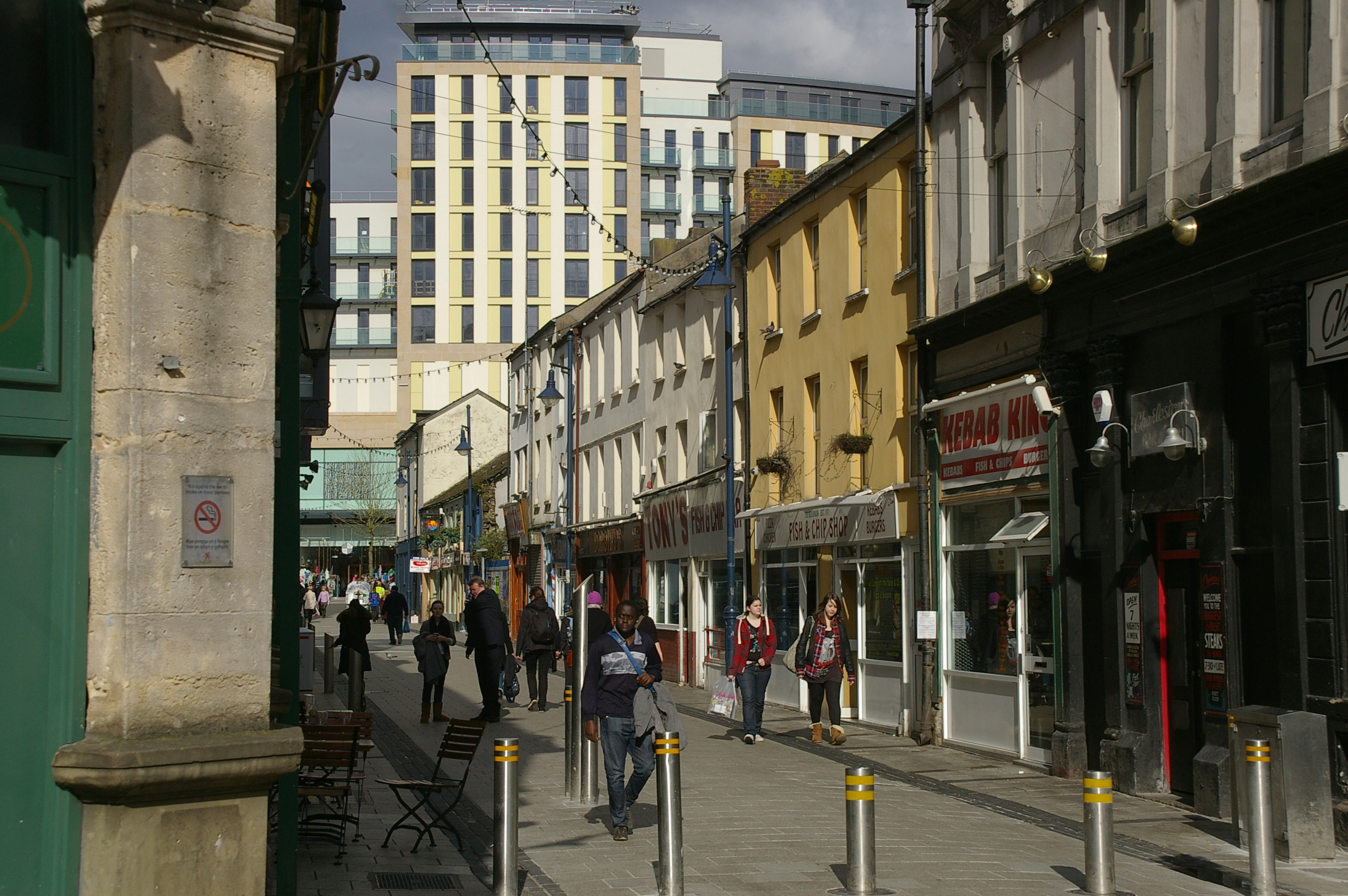
Caroline Street - 'Chip Alley'/'Chippy Lane' (2010)

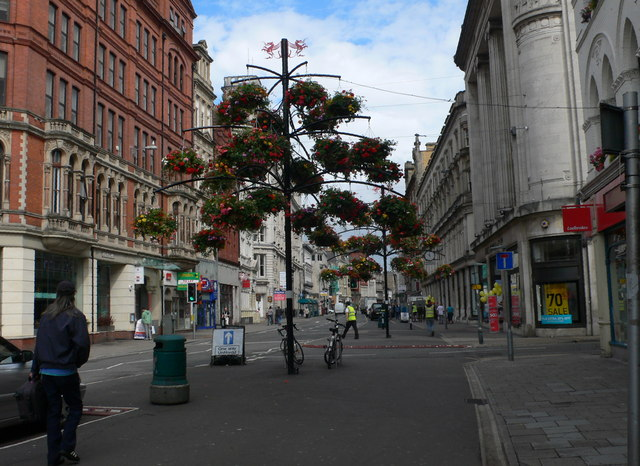
St Mary Street, northern end (2009)

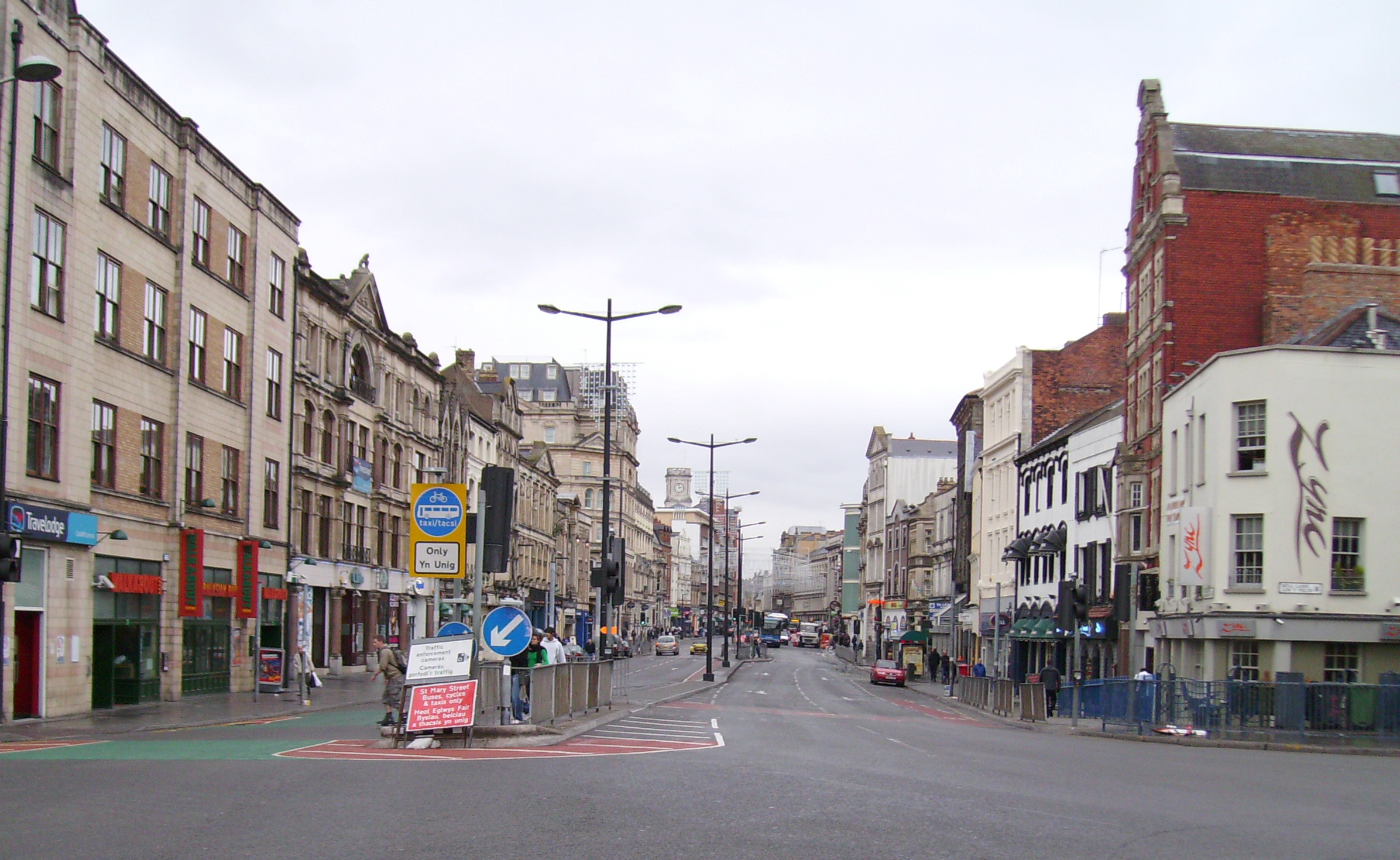
St Mary Street, southern end (2007)

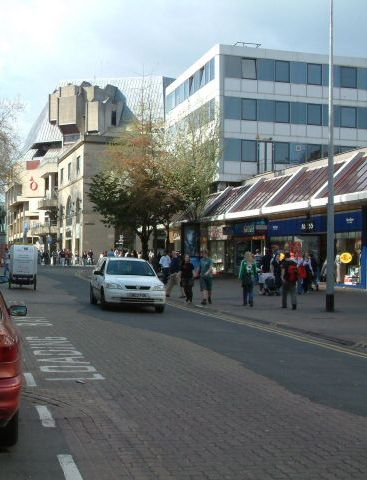
The Hayes before redevelopment (2006)

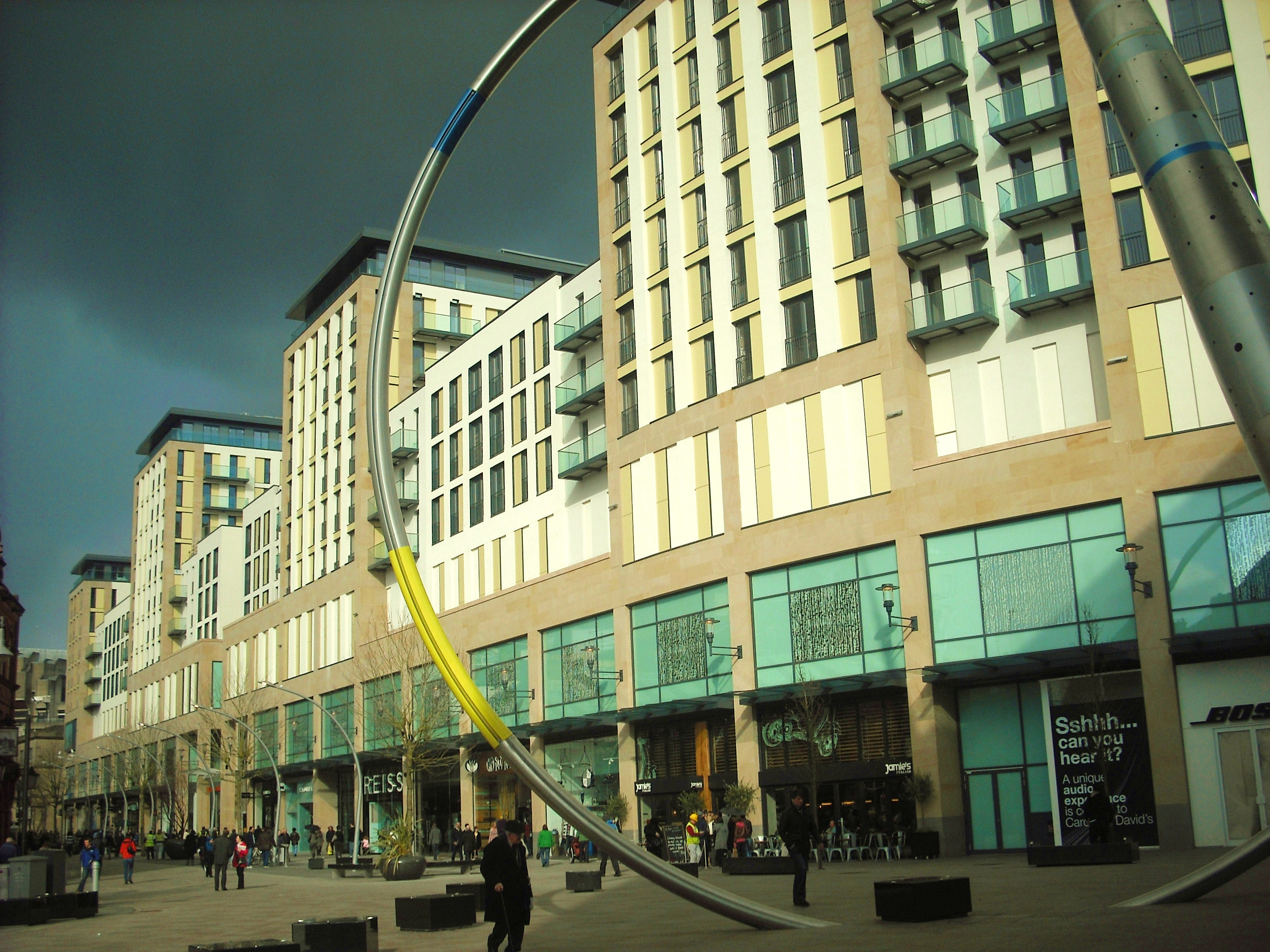
The Hayes and St Davids 2 (2010)

== Squares ==
- Callaghan Square, city centre, previously known as Bute Square.
- Central Square, city centre, included the bus station between 1954 and 2015.
- Loudoun Square, Butetown
- Mount Stuart Square, Butetown
- Roald Dahl Plass, Cardiff Bay.
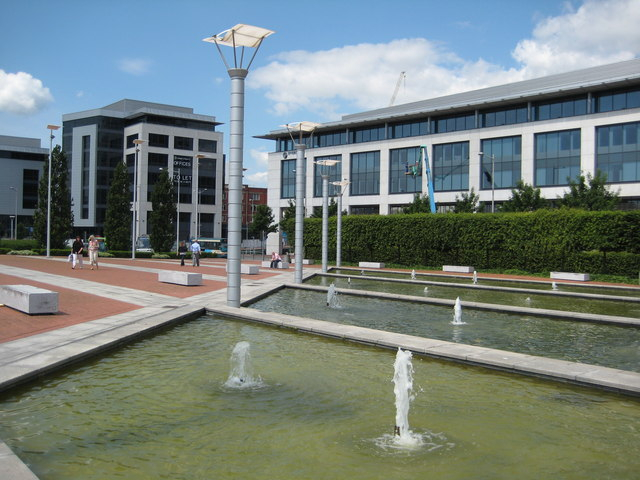
Callaghan Square looking northwest (2008)

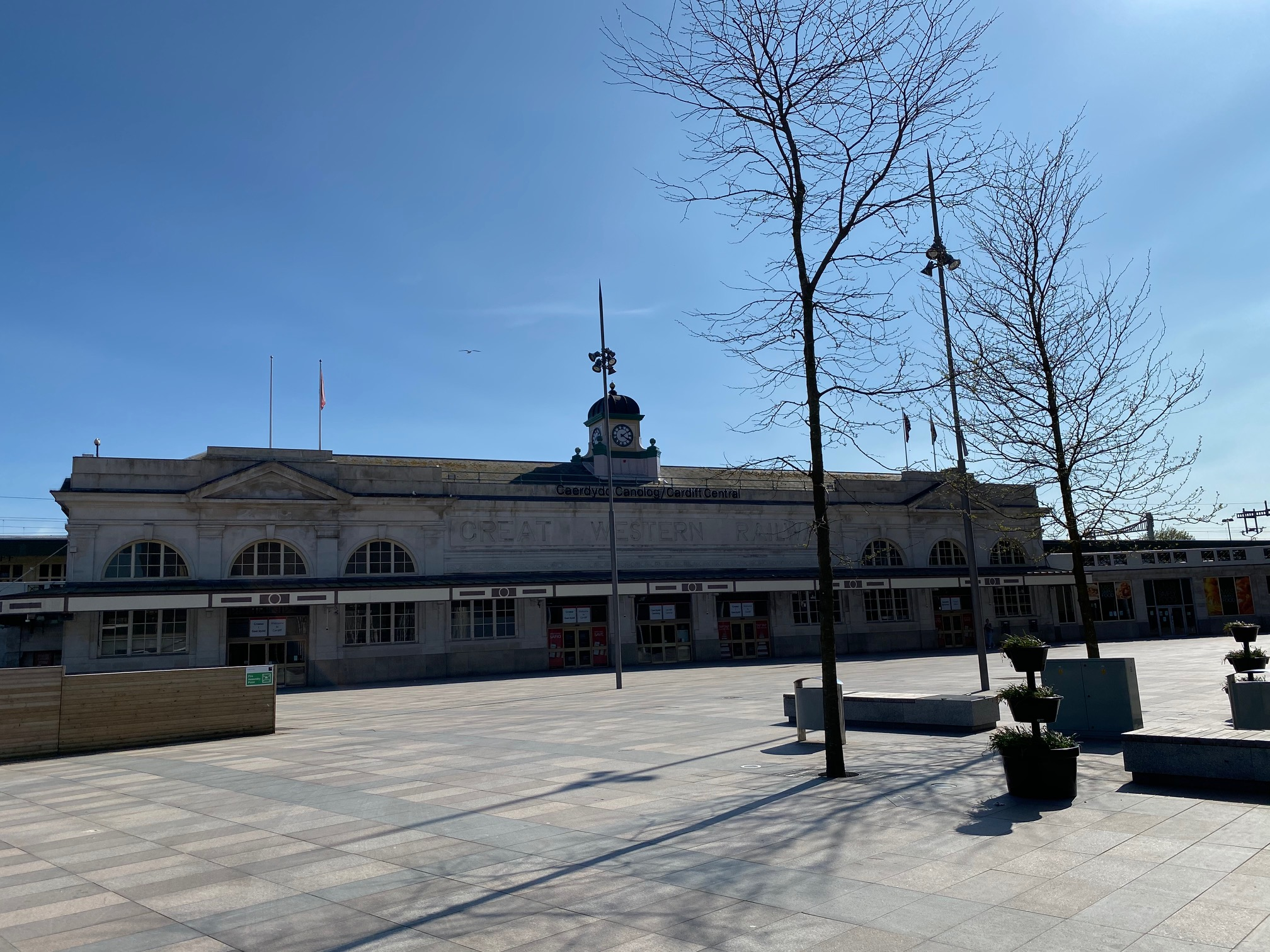
Central Square, Cardiff railway station front (2020)

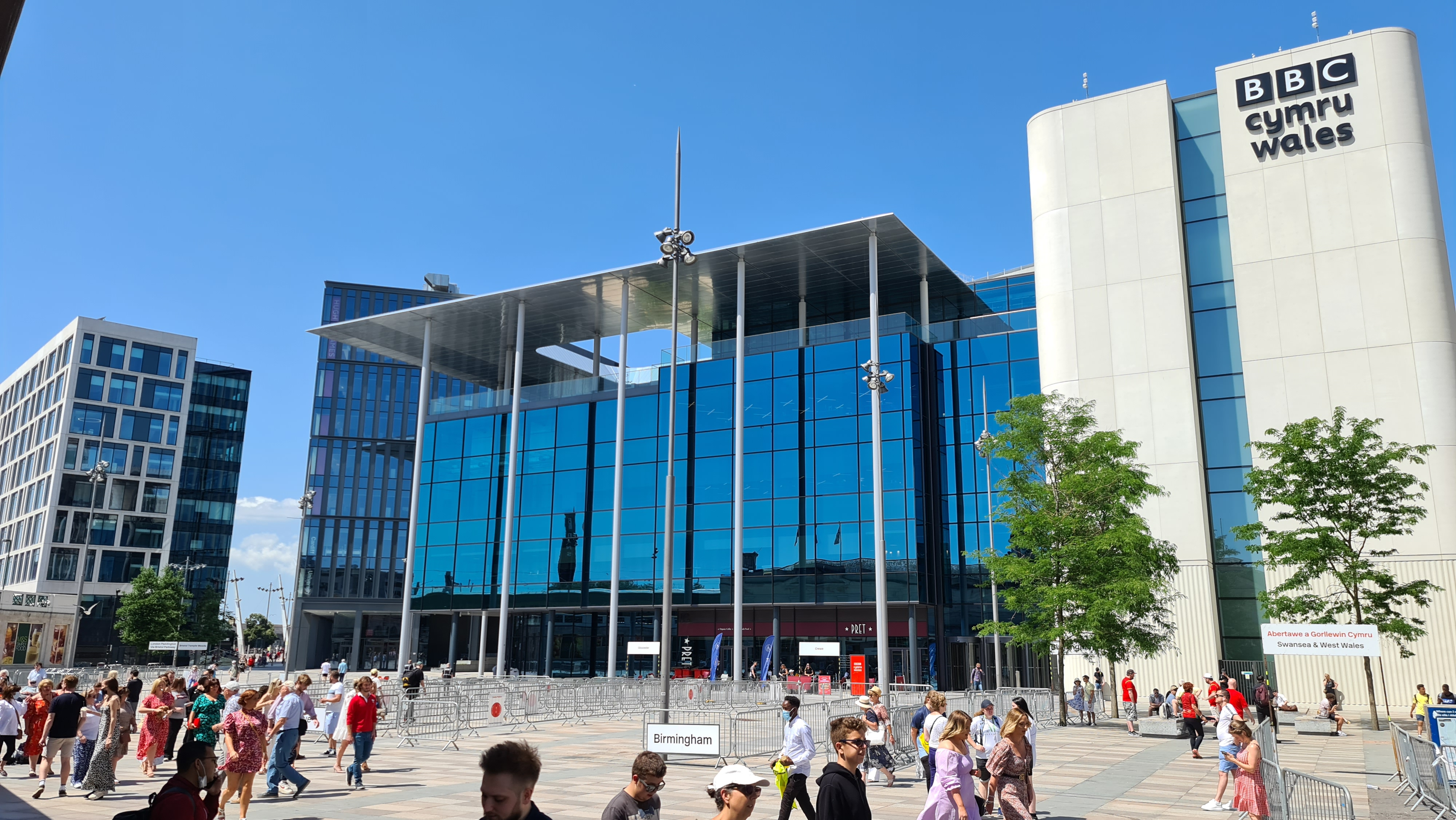
Central Square, Cardiff (2021)

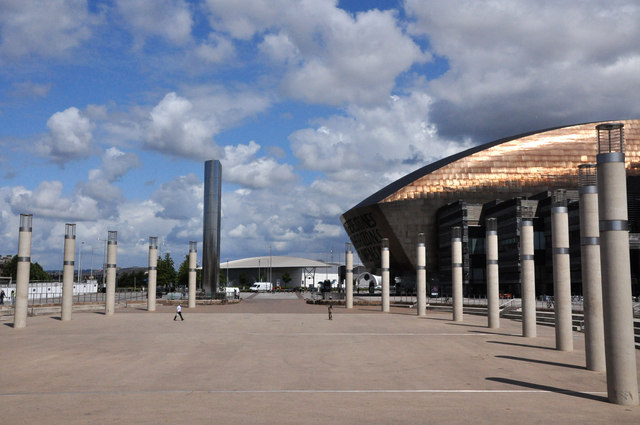
Roald Dahl Plass (2009)

== See also ==
- List of shopping arcades in Cardiff
