= Empire House =

Former office building in Cardiff, Wales

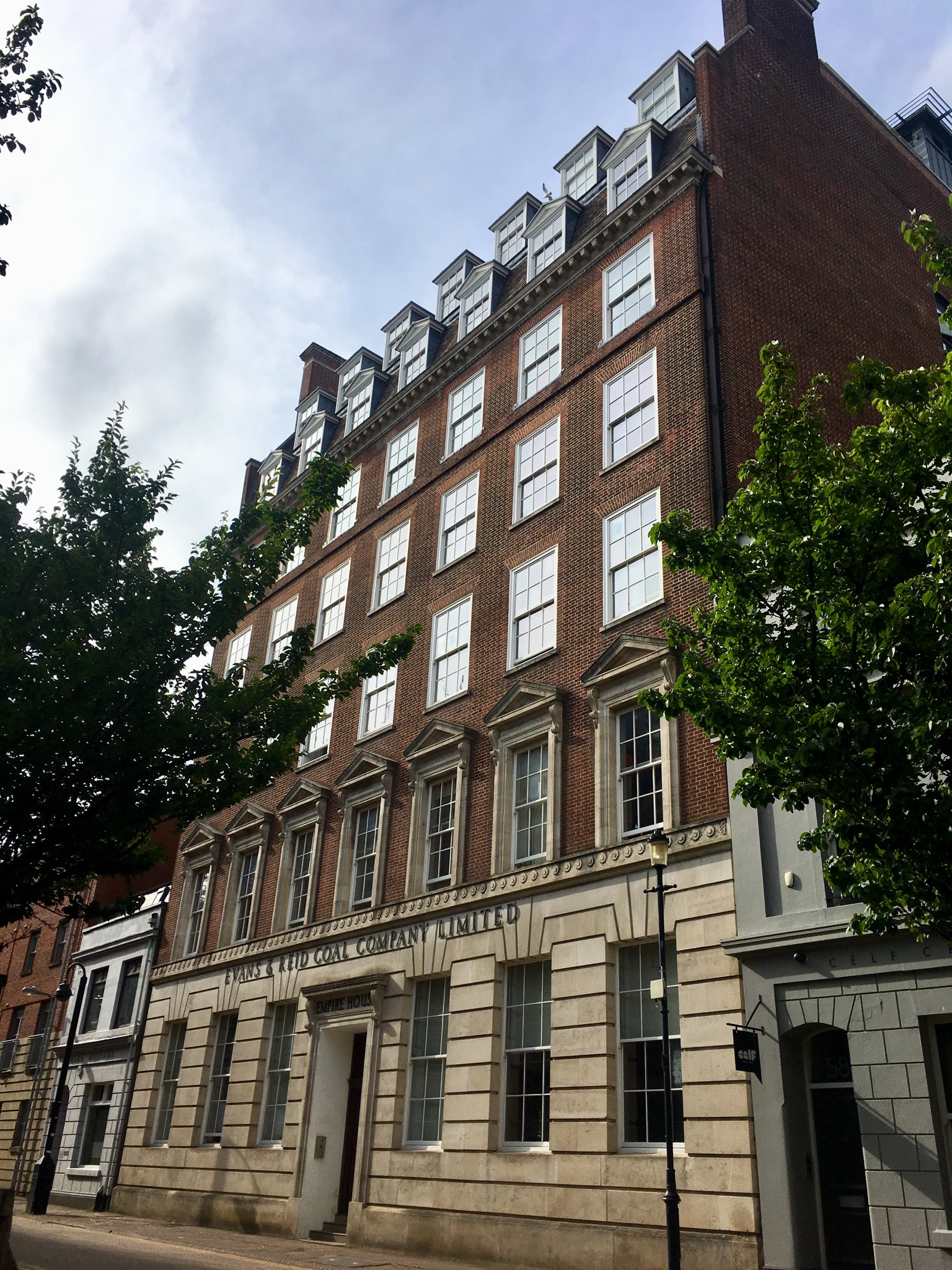
- "the best South Wales example of inter-war, Neo-Georgian architecture"

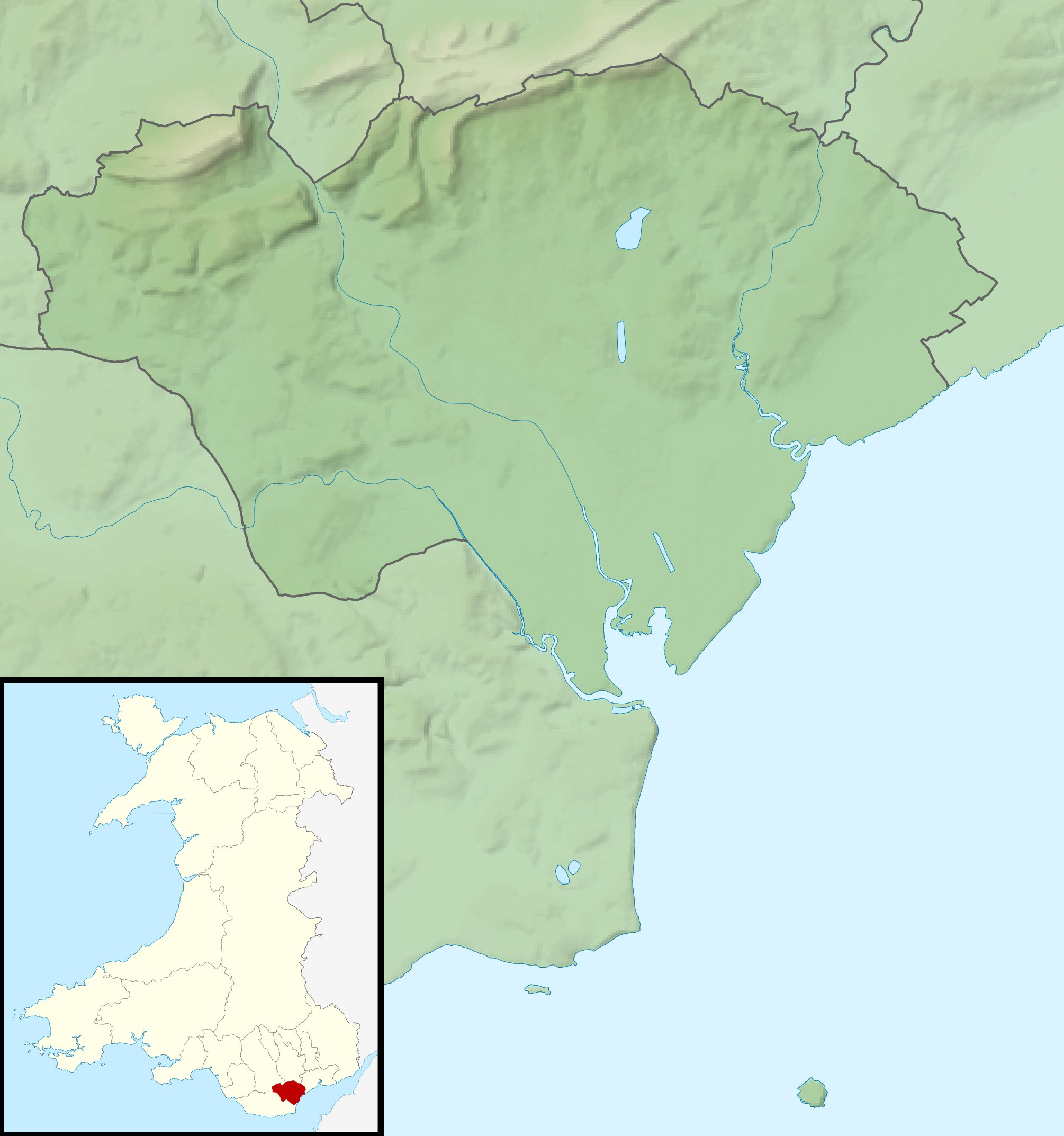
- Location within Cardiff
- 51.4659°N 3.1677°W
- Type: Office block, now apartments
- Location: Butetown, Cardiff, Glamorgan

History
- Built: 1926

Site notes
- Architect(s): Ivor Jones and Percy Thomas
- Architectural style: Neo-Georgian
- Owner: Privately owned

Listed Building – Grade II*
- Official name: Empire House
- Designated: 11 March 1991
- Reference no.: 14007

Empire House, 54 Mount Stuart Square, is a former company headquarters building in Butetown, Cardiff, Wales. Completed in 1926, the building was designed by Ivor Jones and Percy Thomas. Cadw considers it "the best South Wales example of inter-war, Neo-Georgian architecture". Empire House is a Grade II* listed building. After a period of near dereliction, it was converted to apartments in the early 21st century.

== History ==
The area of Butetown was developed from the early 19th century by John Crichton-Stuart, 2nd Marquess of Bute, and by his son, the 3rd marquess. Together they constructed the docks which enabled the export of iron and coal from the South Wales Valleys. While the docks themselves were not especially profitable, the enormous increases in the tonnage of iron, steel and coal exported through them made the Butes immensely wealthy. (Note: A further factor contributing to the growth of the Bute fortune was the increases in ground rent they were able to demand. Owning much of central Cardiff, and almost all of the Butetown area, the development of the city brought them great wealth. An example was the lease of the land on which the Cardiff Coal Exchange was built, directly opposite the site of Empire House on what was then a garden square. This specified rent of one peppercorn "for the first three years, the following two years £100, the next year £200, the following four years £700, and thereafter £1000 a year for the duration of the [99-year] lease".) (Note: Lord Bute's ambition to have Mount Stuart Square rival Belgrave Square in London as a desirable address for the rich and titled was not entirely fulfilled. When its pair, Loudoun Square was nearing completion, The Cardiff and Merthyr Guardian reported on Butetown as being; "increasingly vile and abominable... keepers of public houses and brothels are obtaining possession...Cardiff is gaining a world-wide reputation as the most immoral of seaports".) Empire House was built in 1926 at the instigation of Commander Charles E Evans, Chairman of Evans & Reid, one of the largest coal exporters in South Wales. Evans' chosen architects were Ivor Jones and Percy Thomas. The building stands directly opposite the Cardiff Coal Exchange on Mount Stuart Square.

After a period of near dereliction at the end of the 20th century, Empire House was converted into apartments in the early 21st. In 2015, the flat created from the former company boardroom was advertised as Cardiff's most-expensive one-bedroom rental apartment.

== Architecture and description ==
Empire House is of seven bays and seven storeys. It is built in reinforced concrete to a "Hennebique" design. The façade is Flemish bond red brick with Portland stone ashlar dressings. Cadw considers Empire House "the best South Wales example of inter-war, Neo-Georgian architecture". The architectural historian John Newman, in his Glamorgan volume in the Pevsner Buildings of Wales series, noted its "dominant" position on the north side of Mount Stuart Square, and its "Lutyensesque derivation". Despite its conversion to apartments, the building's interior retains many period features, including the "handsome Louis Quinze openwork metal lift-cage". The lift was built by the American manufacturers, Waygood Otis. Empire House is a Grade II* listed building.

== Sources ==
- Davies, John (1981). Cardiff and the Marquesses of Bute. Cardiff, UK: University of Wales Press. ISBN 978-0-708-32463-9.
- Newman, John (1995). Glamorgan. The Buildings of Wales. London, UK: Penguin Books. ISBN 978-0-140-71056-4. OCLC 33858574.
