= The Point, Cardiff =

Former music venue in a church in Wales

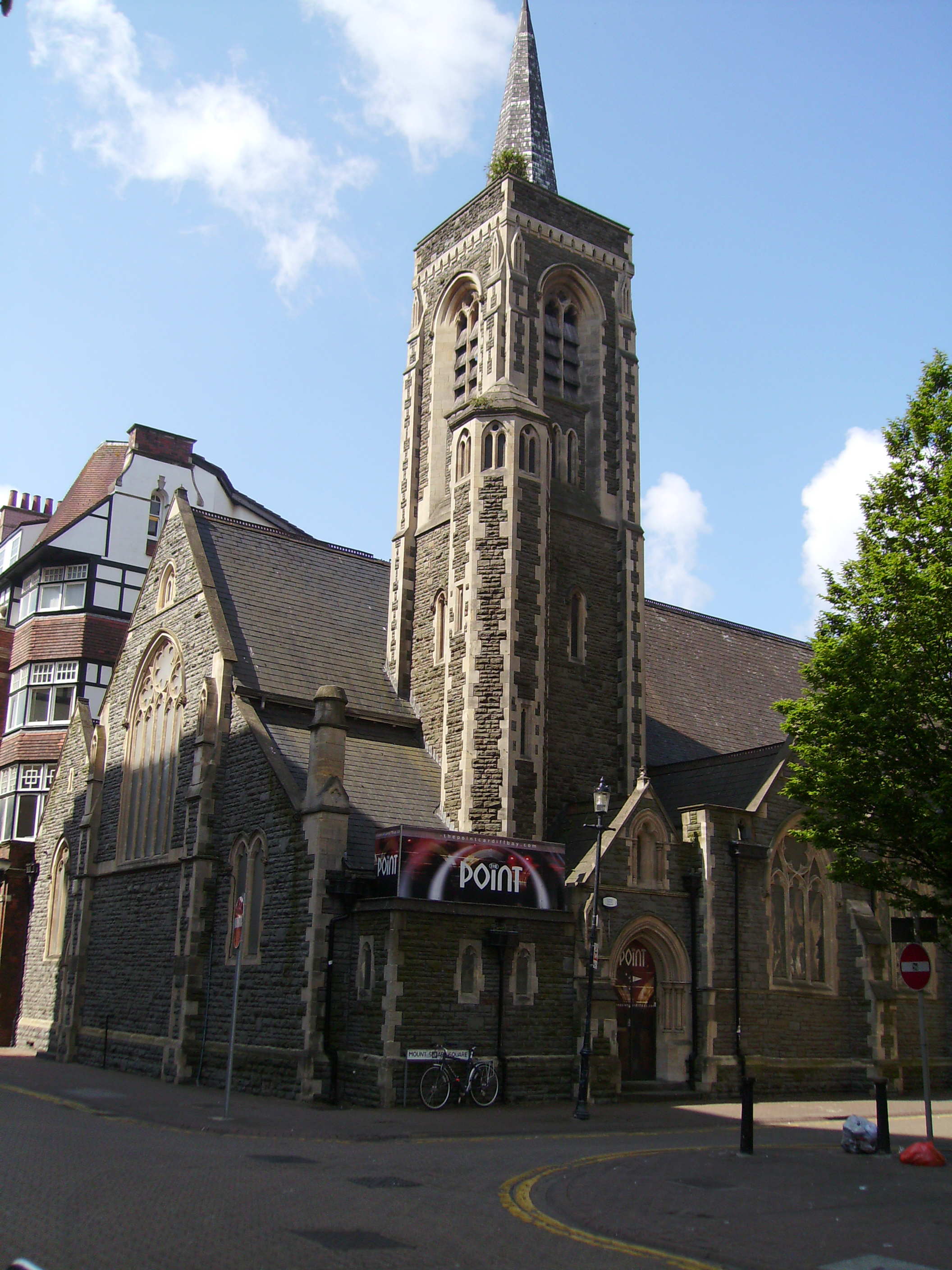
- The Point in 2009

- Location within Cardiff
- Location: Cardiff
- Coordinates: 51.465°N 3.168°W
- Type: Music venue

Construction
- Opened: 2003
- Closed: 2009

The Point was a music venue in Cardiff Bay, Cardiff, Wales, located in the deconsecrated Grade II-listed St Stephen's Church.

== Church ==
The Point was situated in the old merchant's quarter of Mount Stuart Square. The focal point of the square was St Stephen's church, that would later be turned into The Point.

The church was designed by architect E. M. Bruce Vaughan and constructed between 1900-2 to replace a temporary iron frame church and opened as the chapel of St. Mary's. In 1912, it became a separate parish under the name of St. Stephen. The church was designed in a Gothic style, the interior dominated by a single nave with six bays of pointed arches and an arch-braced roof. The exterior includes a bell tower at the northeast corner with an octagonal spire.

In May 1975 it became a Grade II listed building, presently listed as "The Point (Formerly St Stephen's Church)". The church was deconsecrated in 1992.

== Entertainment venue ==
The church was used as a community centre and theatre until 2001, when it was purchased by its current owners. Renovations in 2003 transformed the church to a venue for live music performance and regular club-nights, including Bogiez. The entire building was restored and much of the original architecture was kept, including all the stained glass windows. The Point is now equipped with a fully functional and permanent stage, lighting system, in-house PA, and projection system.

In early 2009 The Point announced its closure, citing reasons such as continued noise complaints from neighbours, which had led to a costly refurbishing and soundproofing bill. Singer Cerys Matthews weighed in her support for the venue, saying her 2006 gig there was "one of the most memorable gigs I’ve ever played. The acoustics are brilliant and it’s a very intimate experience with the audience... Singers come to Wales to play places like The Point so we can’t really afford to lose them."

== See also ==
- List of cultural venues in Cardiff
