= Loudoun Square =

Residential square in Cardiff, Wales

Coordinates: 51.4699°N 3.1706°W

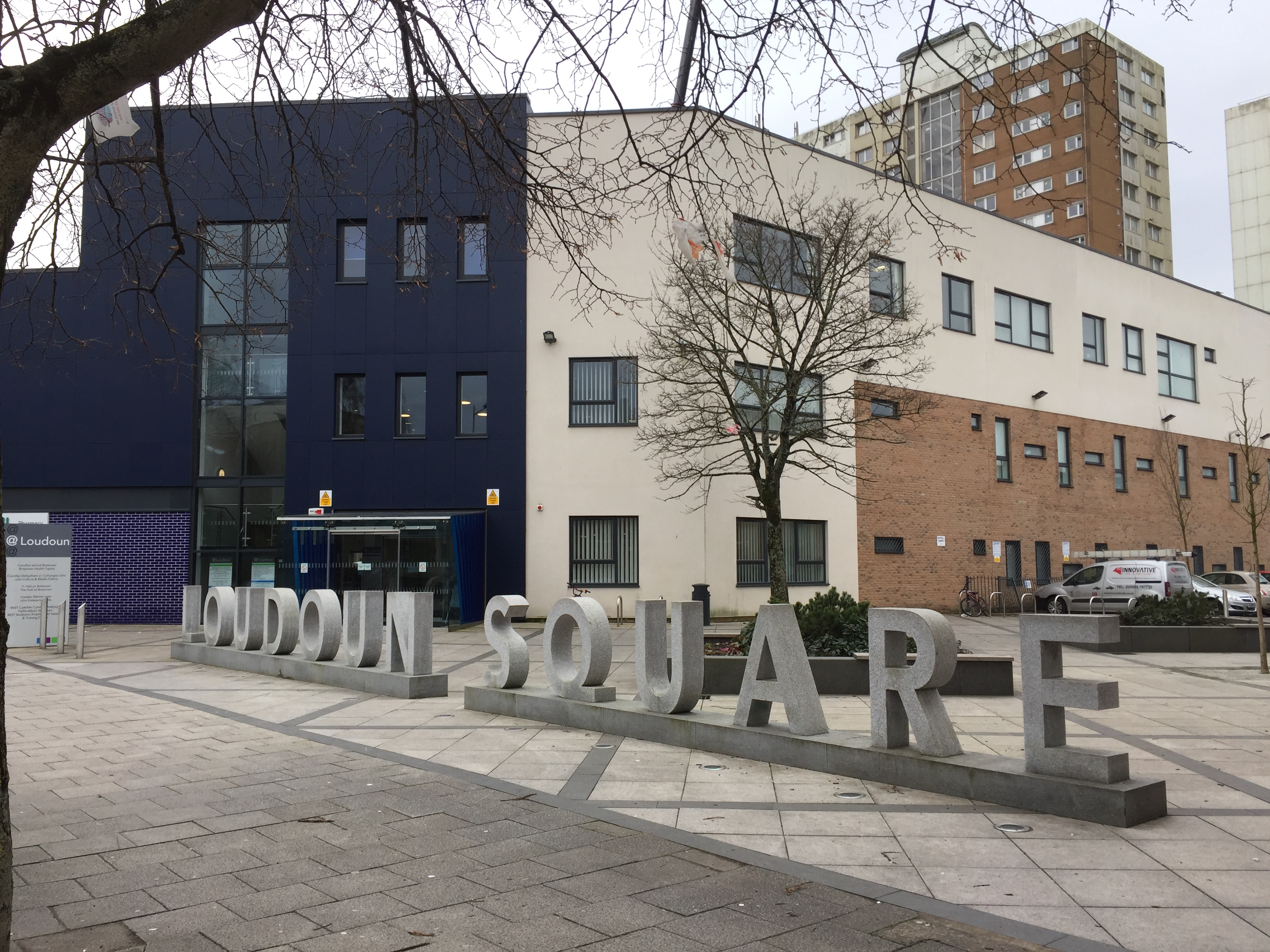
Loudoun Square

Loudoun Square is a residential square in Cardiff, Wales. Described as "the heart of the old Tiger Bay", the square is the location of two of Cardiff's few residential tower blocks, as well as shops, a pub, church, health centre and community centre.

== History ==
During the 1840s the Marquess of Bute created the residential area of Butetown, to house workers for the new Cardiff Docks. After his death (in 1848), and the death in 1852 of the owner of a glassworks on the site, land was acquired between West Bute Street (to the east) and the Glamorganshire Canal (to the west) to create a large square of three-storey decorative houses. It was shown as "Luton Square" on an 1855 map. The square was a "jewell" in "perhaps the poshest place in town", surrounding a green tranquil park with its houses home to shipwrights, mariners, merchants, brokers and builders. The area became highly multicultural, "one of the most colourful and cosmopolitan communities on Earth".

By the 1880s the wealthier residents had moved away to the new suburbs. While the nearby Mount Stuart Square became the site for an impressive new Coal Exchange building, Loudoun Square became increasingly overcrowded as residents took in tenants to help pay the high rents. The Loudoun Square area became known as "Tiger Bay", and the racial composition became even more diverse with the arrival of seafarers on the ships in the period before the Great War.

== 1960s redevelopment ==
Tower blocks in Loudoun Square

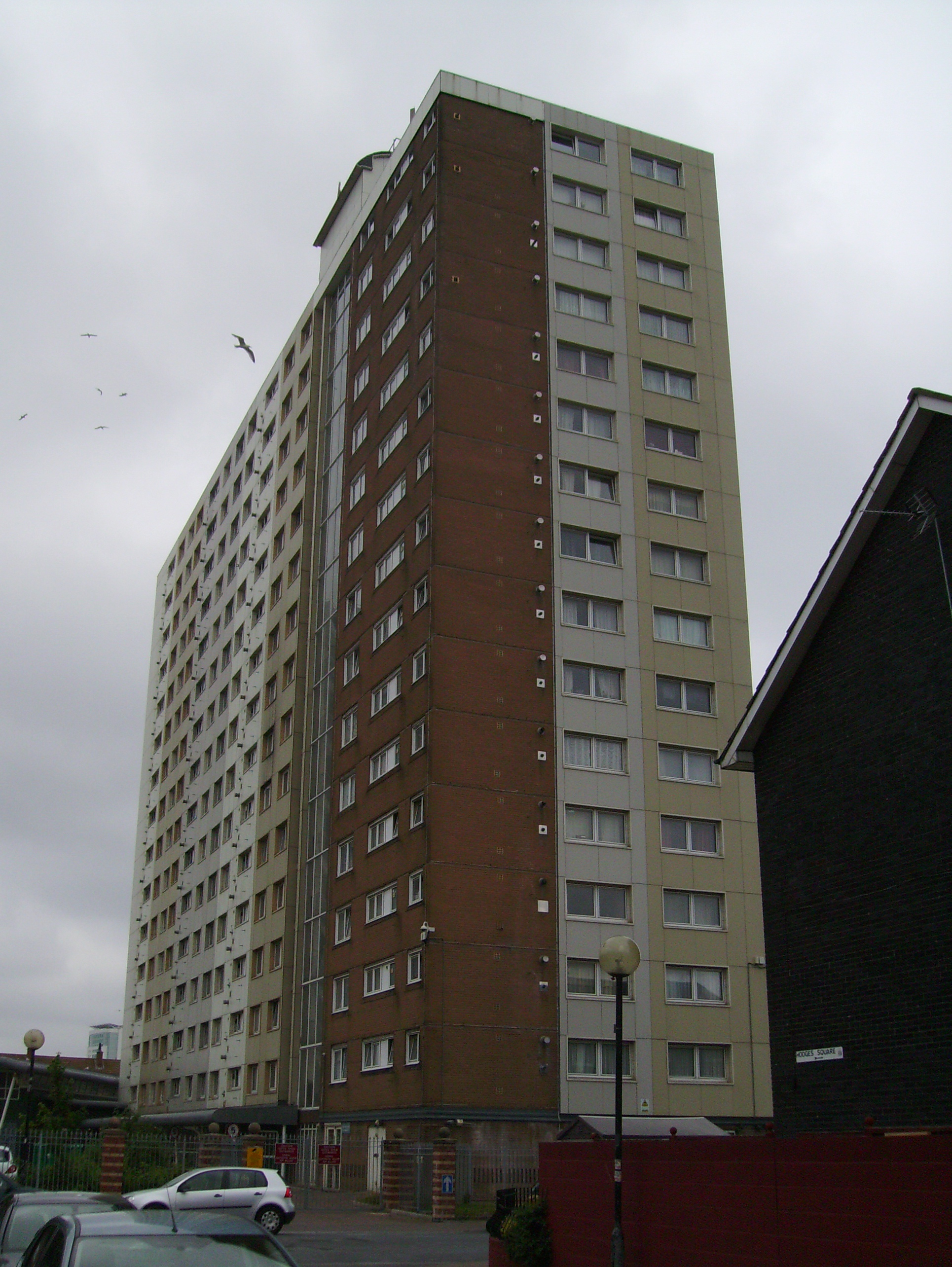
Loudoun House

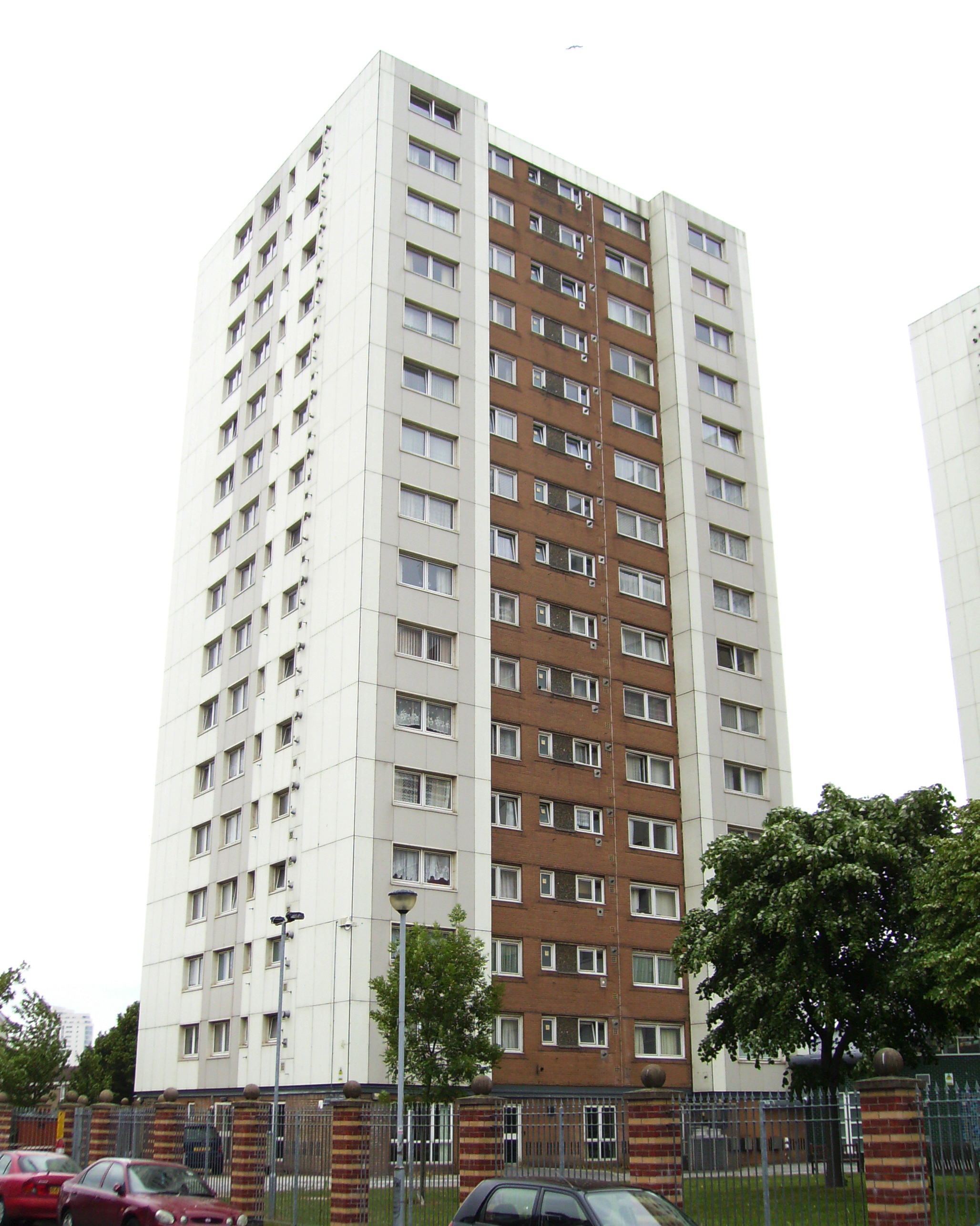
Nelson House

By the late 1940s the houses in Butetown were in extremely poor repair and the area was seen by the city authorities as a physical and moral slum. It was decided to demolish the existing houses and replace them with modern residential tower blocks. Loudoun Square was the first area to be tackled and the nineteenth century housing was cleared in 1960. Residents of the square were moved to new housing or decanted to Cardiff's suburban housing estates. Between 1960 and 1966 two 16-storey tower blocks, Loudoun House and Nelson House, were built on the centre of Loudoun Square.

== Twenty-first century ==
A new foyer, "hotel-style" concierge reception and garden area was created by Cardiff Council for Loudoun House and Nelson House in 2001, described by a resident as "similar to the St David's Hotel".

In summer 2010 work started to replace and improve the facilities in the square, with a £13 million revamp led by Cardiff Community Housing Association. The new facilities would include a new shopping centre, community hub and a health centre, together with 13 new houses and 48 apartments to a BREEAM accredited eco-standard.

In 2023, a new station on the South Wales Metro was planned to open in the area, serving 3 Light Rapid Transit lines to Treherbert, Aberdare, and Merthyr Tydfil, Cardiff City Centre and Cardiff Bay (with plans to extend to the Senedd and Cardiff Parkway).

== Sources ==
- Evans, Catherine; Dodsworth, Steve; Barnett, Julie (1984), Below the Bridge: A photo-historical survey of Cardiff's docklands to 1983, Cardiff: National Museum of Wales Cardiff, ISBN 0-7200-0288-5
