= Mount Stuart Square =

City square in Cardiff, Wales

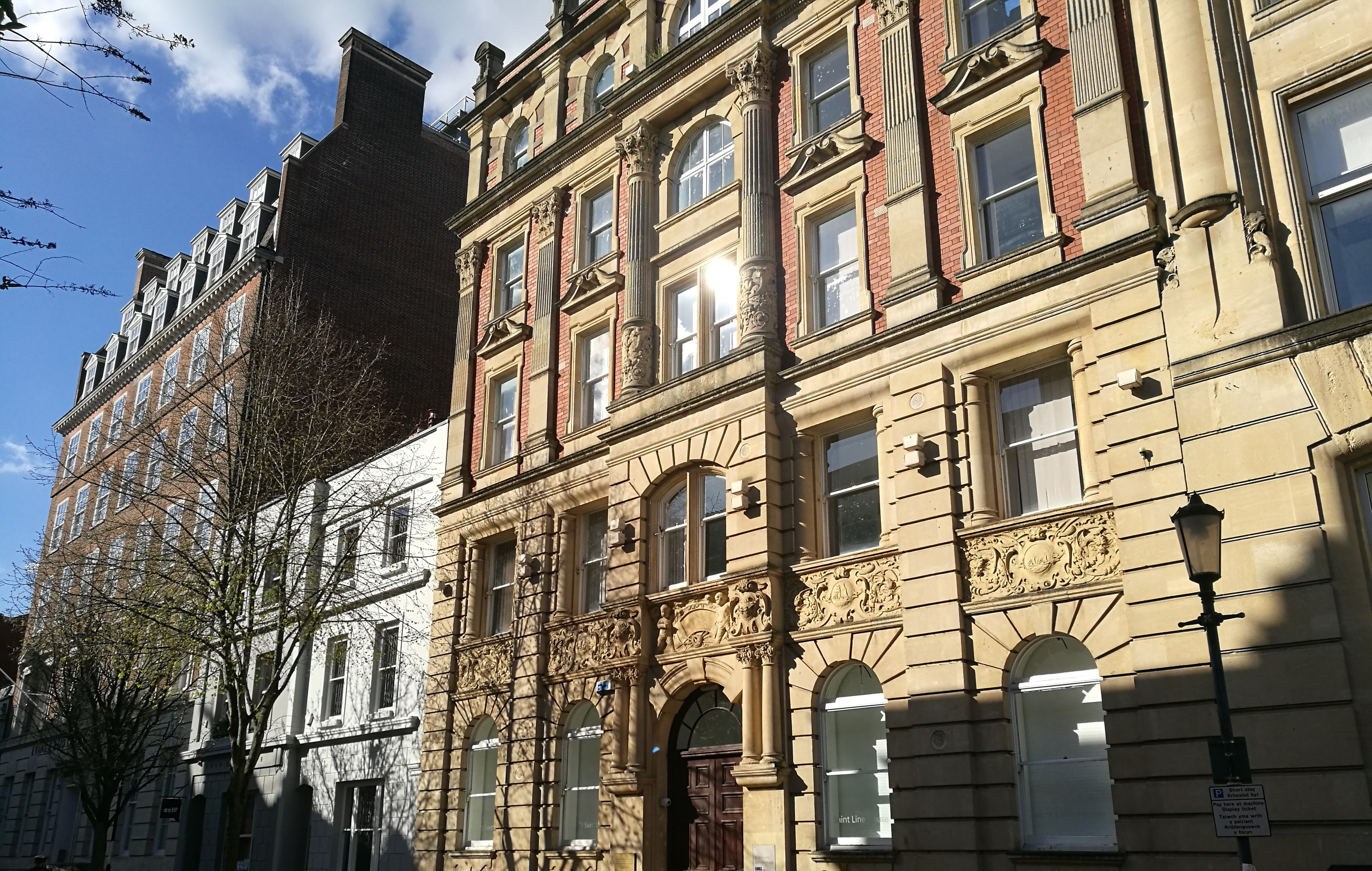
- View of Mount Stuart Square on its northern side, including Empire House, a Grade II* Listed Building, and St Line House

- Location within Cardiff
- Maintained by: Cardiff Council
- Location: Cardiff, Wales
- Postal code: CF10
- Coordinates: 51.465825°N 3.168174°W
- North: West Close
- East: West Bute Street
- South: A4119 James Street
- West: Glamorganshire Canal

Construction
- Completion: c. 1855

Mount Stuart Square is a residential and commercial square in Cardiff, Wales. It is located in the Butetown area of the city. Originally developed in the late 1800s as a residential location for nearby dock workers, it quickly became a centre for upscale residential properties which revolved around the main square. By 1900, commercial activity had taken its place, dominated by the Coal Exchange, which occupied the once open central space. The square contains a high concentration of listed buildings, which represent a range of architectural styles and some of Cardiff's finest examples of late 19th and early 20th century commercial architecture. Mount Stuart Square area was designated a Conservation Area in July 1980.

== Geography ==
The area which Mount Stuart Square currently occupies was originally coastal mudflat. In its present form, it is an urban area, bordered by the A4119 James Street, a major road to the south, early twentieth century social housing to the north (on a site which had previously been used as a rail yard), historic commercial properties to the east on West Bute Street, and the historic Glamorganshire Canal to the west. The canal was drained in December 1951 when a steam suction dredger crashed into the inner lock gates, forcing them to collapse, and all the water was released into the estuary. The gates were never repaired, and for a number of years the canal remained dry until the land was filled in and converted to parkland, named Canal Park. The square lies approximately half a mile to the south of Loudoun Square, which was also built as a residential square but never developed a commercial hub. Junctions with James Street and West Bute Street provide vehicular access to the square, and pedestrian access exists to the parkland to the west. The square has a one way traffic system, where vehicles enter at the junction with James Street to the south west, and exit via either James Street or West Bute Street. Mount Stuart Square has a distinctive form with buildings on four sides facing the Cardiff Coal Exchange building in the centre. It is not a square in the true sense because the building area was limited by the physical restrictions of the canal to the west. The nearest railway station is Cardiff Bay.

== History ==
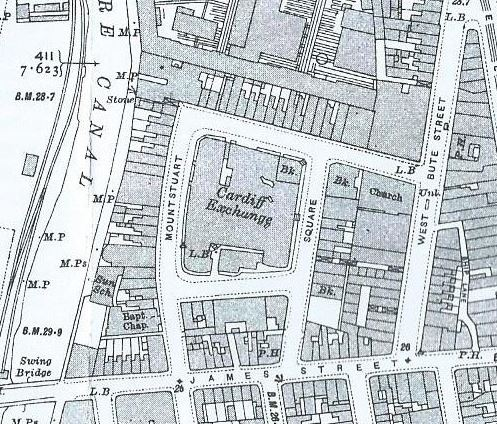
Mount Stuart Square in 1920, Ordnance Survey

The development of Mount Stuart Square is closely linked to that of the coal industry in South Wales. The mining of coal in the South Wales valleys in the 1790s onwards meant that Cardiff developed into a port through which the coal was shipped and exported worldwide. It was initially transported using the Glamorganshire Canal, and later by rail on the Taff Vale Railway, both of which terminated close to the site of the square. A number of docks were constructed to facilitate the movement of this coal, and the entire Butetown area of Cardiff was transformed to accommodate the new industry. By the 1830s, Cardiff became the pre-eminent iron-exporting port, shipping almost half of British overseas iron exports; between 1840 and 1870, the volume of coal exports increased from 44,350 to 2.219 million tonnes. The population of the area increased accordingly, and a grid pattern residential suburb for port-related workers was built on land which included the site of the square.

In its original form, Mount Stuart Square was a residential square with a central garden. It was constructed in 1855 as a select residential enclave around ornamental gardens for merchants and sea captains, and originally consisted of 45 stuccoed three-storey town houses. The land had originally been mudflats, but later the Cardiff Glassworks had partially occupied the area. As a result, the underlying soil was a mixture of alluvial mud and slag from the glassworks, which required 30 feet concrete shafts to be constructed that rested on a bed of hard gravel in order to construct the foundations of the square. In the period immediately before construction of the square commenced, the land was used as stables for canal horses Named after Lord Mountstuart, the area was the vision of John Crichton-Stuart, 2nd Marquess of Bute, who wanted to create a grand Georgian space to rival Berkeley Square in London. The development of the square was part of his vision to transform Cardiff into a major port, improve the value of his lands in Cardiff itself and increase the value of the royalties he could charge on his coal fields. As the docks rose in prominence, wealthy residents moved out and it became a commercial centre. The construction of the Coal Exchange building between 1884 and 1888 by Edwin Seward solidified the change in focus to commercial, and it became central to the coal trade activity in Cardiff docks for much of the early part of the 20th century. Built to provide a dedicated location for merchants and traders to sell coal, it followed construction of buildings of a similar function in London, Liverpool and Manchester. It was constructed in stages, the central trading hall and east block completed first. The London and Provincial Banking Company occupied the majority of the north side. In 1904 the world's first recorded £1m deal was struck there. Those of the original town houses not converted were replaced by purpose-built offices for coal and shipping firms. The buildings surrounding the Coal Exchange housed coal companies, banks and agents. Most of Cardiff's notable architects of the period are represented including Alexander Roos, architect to the Bute Estate, Edwin Seward, E W M Corbett, W D Blessley, Teather and Wilson, Ivor Jones and Percy Thomas, and Henry Budgen.

The impact of WW1 was significant on the square, having a damaging effect on the coal industry. By 1921, only six of the 52 companies operating in 1888 were still in business, with the industry never recovering. The Coal Exchange closed in 1958, which in turn reduced the demand for commercial premises on the square and allowed boarding houses to be established. In 1970, a report produced by the City Council entitled 'South Butetown Appraisal', concluded "it is difficult to think in planning terms of any other future for the area than a decent funeral". By the early 21st century, all banks had vacated their properties on the square. The western side of the square saw a gradual demolition of original properties, and by the 1990s was no longer enclosed on its border with the canal. Much of the land was being used as open air carparks, until the construction of St James and St Stephens Mansions, and later the Casablanca Building, which once again enclosed the square.

== Current status ==
=== Architecture ===
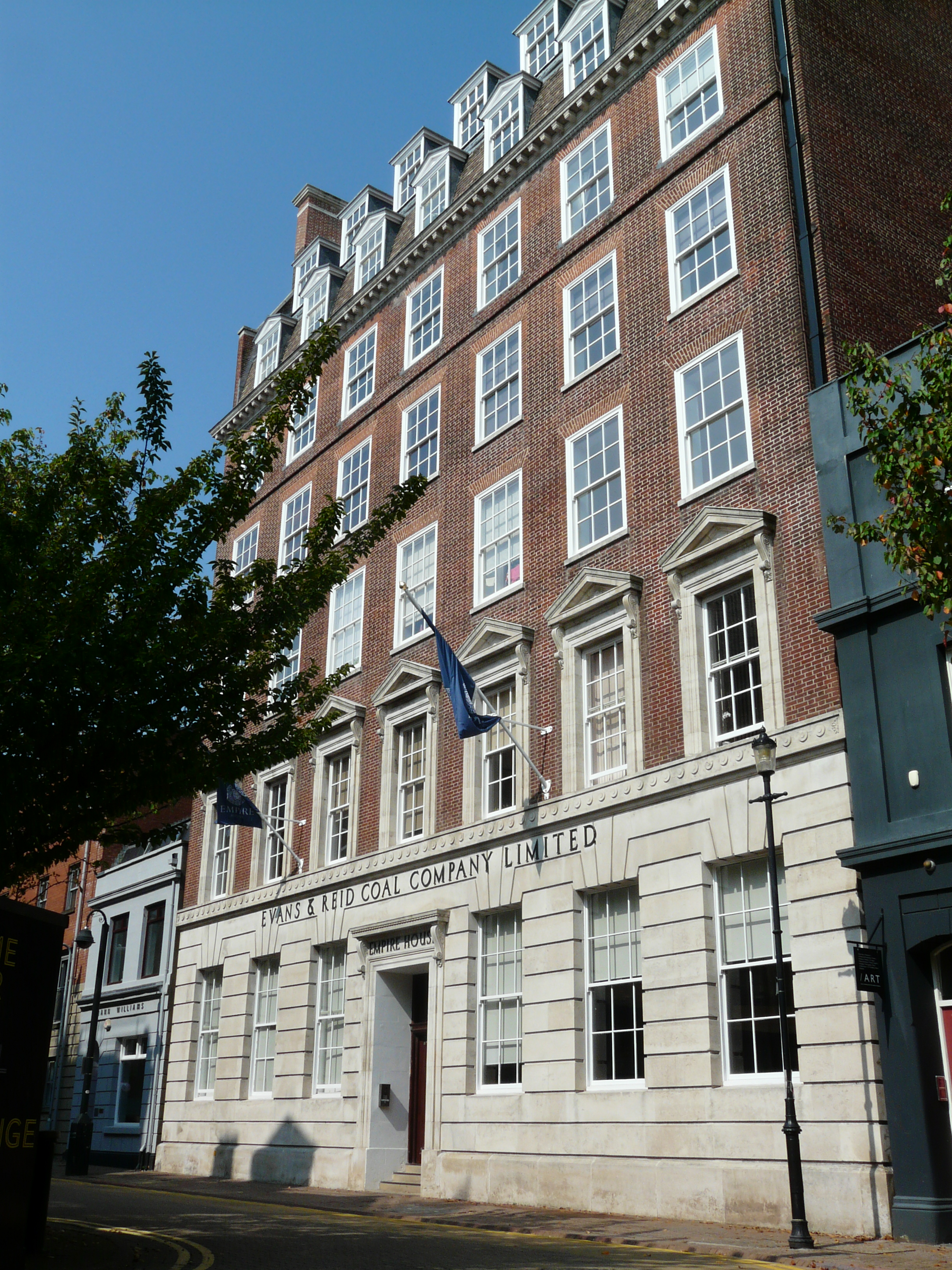
The 7 storey Empire House on the north side of the square

The majority of buildings throughout the square range from 3 – 5 storeys, however; some of the surviving domestic buildings are 2-storey. The later commercial buildings are significantly larger than the former houses, both in height and overall mass. The streets are relatively narrow in relation to the large commercial buildings. A key characteristic are the variances in the scale between buildings. This is especially dramatic where the remaining 2-storey buildings are side by side with imposing 5-storey commercial buildings. St Stephens and St James Mansions are large high rise residential buildings constructed in 2003, which occupy a large section of the north western part of the square. The Coal Exchange building is of a French Renaissance style, and occupies a central position in the square, rising to five storeys.

=== Occupancy ===
The square has a mixed commercial, hospitality and residential occupancy. It is home to a number of media, marketing, financial, legal and not for profit organisations, including the Wales Council for Voluntary Action, The Royal College of General Practitioners Wales, and Literature Wales. Organizations working with the education sector include the Quality Assurance Agency for Higher Education and the National Union of Students Wales. There are a number of establishments serving food and drink. The Mexican Honorary Consulate in Cardiff has offices in the square. The Exchange Hotel operates from the former Coal Exchange building in the centre of the square.

=== Places of worship ===
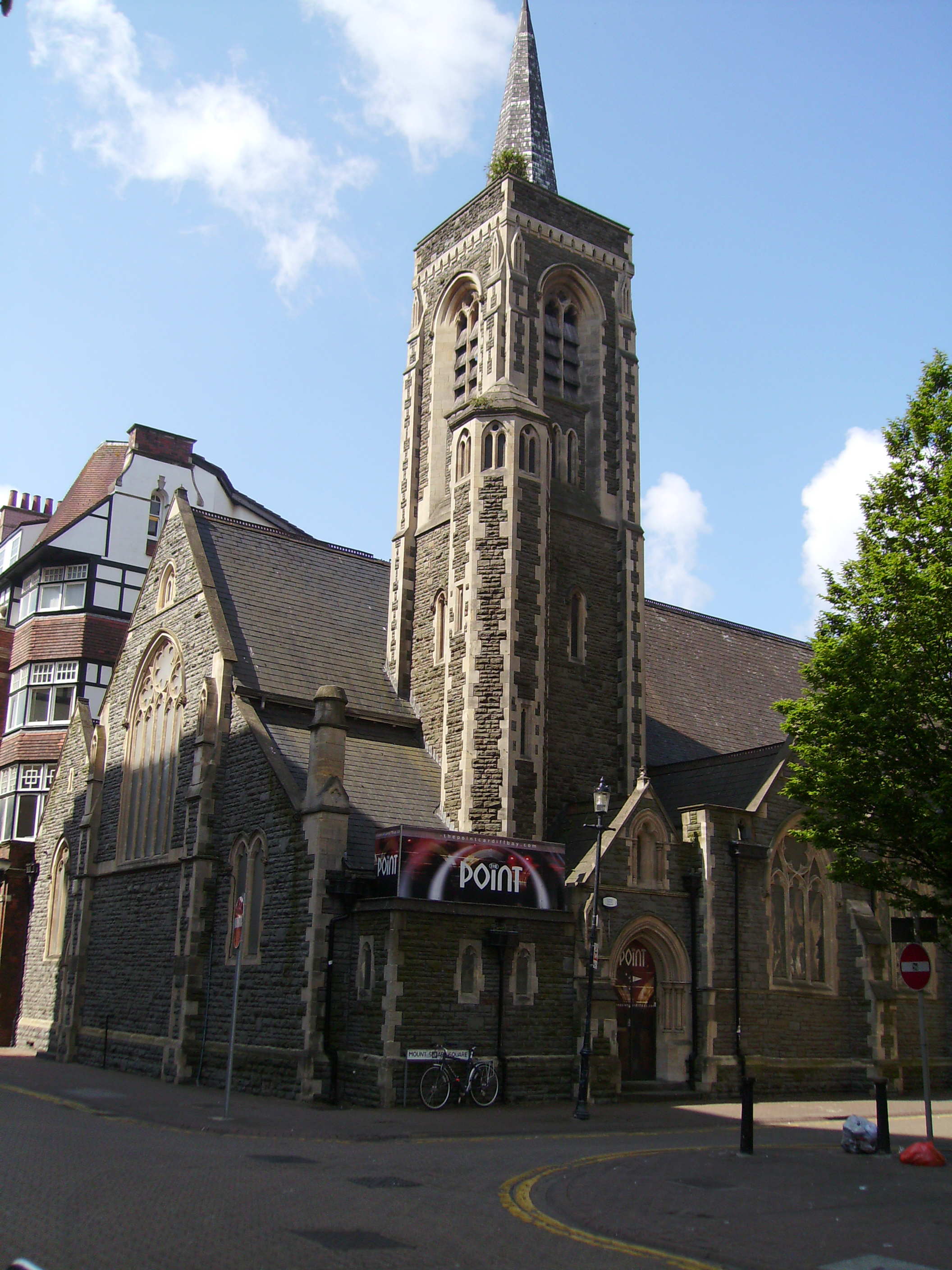
St Stephen's Church, Mount Stuart Square

Mount Stuart Square has been home to a number of religious buildings, in addition to its function as a residential and commercial space. The only remaining building is St Stephen's Church, designed by architect E. M. Bruce Vaughan and constructed between 1900 and 1902. It is located at the junction with West Bute Street. Designed in a Gothic style, the parish was deconsecrated in 1992. Between 2003 and 2009, the building was used as a live music venue called The Point. The Bethel English Baptist Chapel, located near the southern entrance to the square, was built in 1858 and renovated in 1898 and again in 1910. It was brick built in the Classical and Lombardic/Italianate style over two storeys, and was the location of Ivor Novello's baptism. This chapel closed in 1965 and the Casablanca Club operated from the site from 1965 to 1985. It was demolished in the 1990s, the land used as a carpark until in 2021 when construction completed on the Casablanca Buildings, a boutique high-rise apartment block. The Siloam Welsh Baptist Chapel in the northeast corner next to Lloyds Bank, was opened in 1859, but in 1902 converted into a commercial building known as Phoenix House, which retained the majority of the original building except the font wall. The Mount Stuart Welsh Independent Chapel, now demolished, was built in 1858 and rebuilt in 1864 to the design of architect Thomas Thomas of Landore.

=== Future developments ===
In 2016 it was announced that the Coal Exchange was to be fully refurbished as a hotel, with a museum detailing the history of the building and of the Cardiff Docks. In 2009, Cardiff Council identified a number of challenges facing the square, including a loss of architectural detailing, a need to improve physical access to some buildings, a number of underused or vacant listed buildings which show signs of serious deterioration. In 2017, a call was made to house a gallery or museum in one of the buildings on the square, with the aim of being a catalyst for regeneration.

== Cultural references ==
The location is regularly used by the BBC for filming, including Dr Who, Torchwood, Casualty, Upstairs, Downstairs and Sherlock. The film The Vision was filmed on site at the Coal Exchange building on the square. In 1988 the building was re-acquired and subsequently completely refurbished in 2001 to turn it into an entertainment venue. It hosted acts such as the Arctic Monkeys, Manic Street Preachers, Ocean Colour Scene, Stereophonics and Biffy Clyro. The Casablanca Club operated from the Bethel English Baptist Chapel from 1965 to 1985, attracting an audience from the diverse Butetown area and beyond, and recognised as one of the biggest centres of R&B outside of the US. It hosted international artists Aretha Franklin, Jimmy Ruffin, Stray Cats and Spandau Ballet, as well as Welsh performers Mickey Gee, Endaf Emlyn and Geraint Jarman. In 2014, the Wales Millennium Centre hosted a production entitled 'Night at the Casablanca', which was a celebration of the musical tradition of the venue. The Point was a live music venue which operated from St Stephen's Church from 2003 to 2009. It hosted acts including Super Furry Animals, Franz Ferdinand, DJ Danger Mouse and The Bluetones. In 2016, filmmaker Nick Broomfield visited the square as part of his documentary Going Going Gone, which investigated the deterioration and heritage of the Coal Exchange building. In June 2017, the BBC broadcast a documentary entitled Saving The Coal Exchange, which looked at the development of the building into a luxury hotel. In September 2017, BBC Wales broadcast a documentary called Cardiff Bay Lives, which featured residents and businesses from the square.

== Notable buildings ==
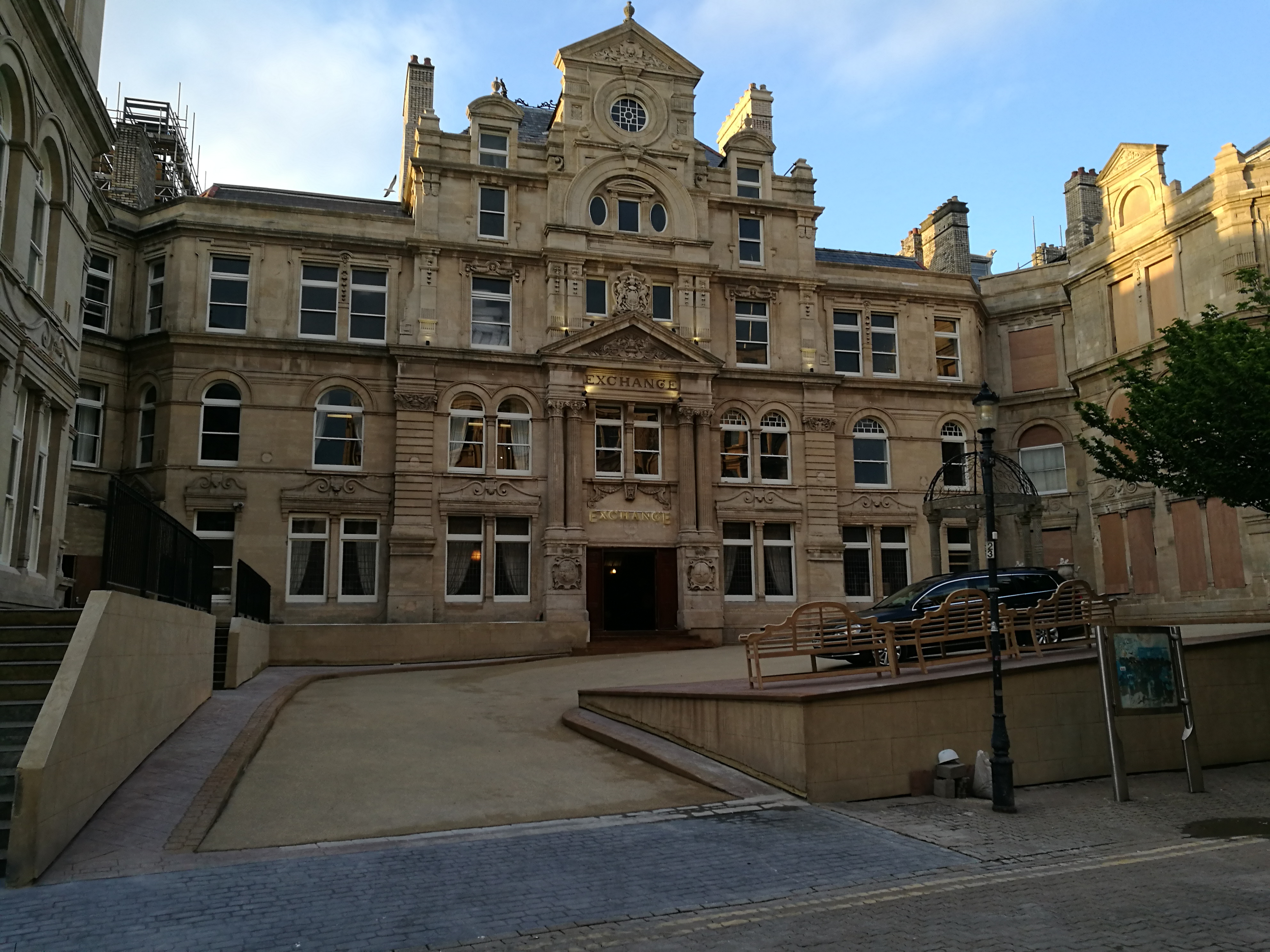
The Coal Exchange, now the Exchange Hotel, a Grade II* listed building

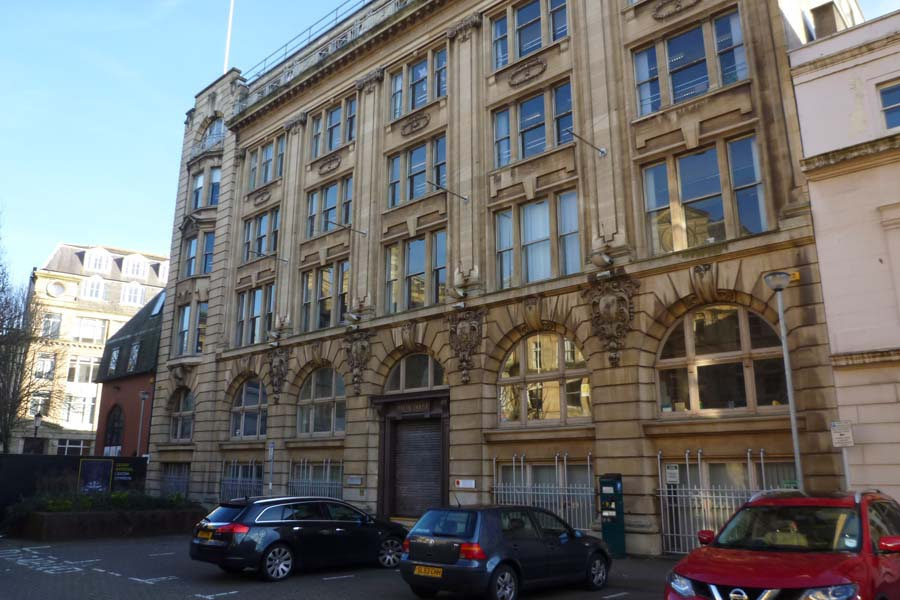
Baltic House, Grade II listed

- Cardiff Coal Exchange, The Exchange Hotel, Grade II* Listed Built 1884–86 to the design of Seward & Thomas, on the site of the central gardens of Mount Stuart Square, The Coal Exchange first opened as the Coal and Shipping Exchange as a market floor for trading in coal, and was for many years the hub of the city's prosperous shipping industry. It was built largely in limestone in the French Renaissance style and is one of the most historically important commercial buildings in Wales, illustrating the region's immense commercial power in late 19th and early 20th centuries. It later became a music venue, before being closed indefinitely in 2013 due to building safety issues. Following a series of proposals to demolish the building, Cardiff Council purchased the Coal Exchange, and in 2016 it was announced that the building was to be fully refurbished as a hotel, with a museum detailing the history of the building and of the Cardiff Docks. The hotel opened in May 2017.
- Empire House, Grade II* Listed Built 1926 by Cardiff architects Ivor Jones and Percy Thomas, the building represents the best South Wales example of inter-war, Neo-Georgian architecture. It has a Georgian style façade and rises to 5 storeys with 2 attic storeys in the deep mansard style. The scheme was conceived before WWI by Commander Charles E Evans, Chairman of the Evans & Reid Coal Company, which was one of the largest firms of coal exporters in South Wales.
- St Line House, Grade II Listed Completed in 1900 by architect H Tudor Thornley, in a free Renaissance style with Dutch influences. It was originally known as'Baltic House', and later (until 2005) 'Beynon House'.
- Baltic House, Grade II Listed Baltic House occupies most of the south side of the square opposite the main entrance of the former Coal Exchange. Formerly it was the site of three houses and an Independent Chapel. It was completed in 1915 by Teather and Wilson, and is an elaborate example of an early 20th century commercial building from the height of city's commercial power.
- St Stephens Church, Grade II Listed The church was designed by architect E. M. Bruce Vaughan and constructed between 1900–2 to replace a temporary iron frame church and opened as the chapel of St. Mary's. In 1912, it became a separate parish under the name of Saint Stephen. The church was designed in a Gothic style, the interior dominated by a single nave with six bays of pointed arches and an arch-braced roof. The exterior includes a bell tower at the northeast corner with an octagonal spire. The parish was deconsecrated in 1992.

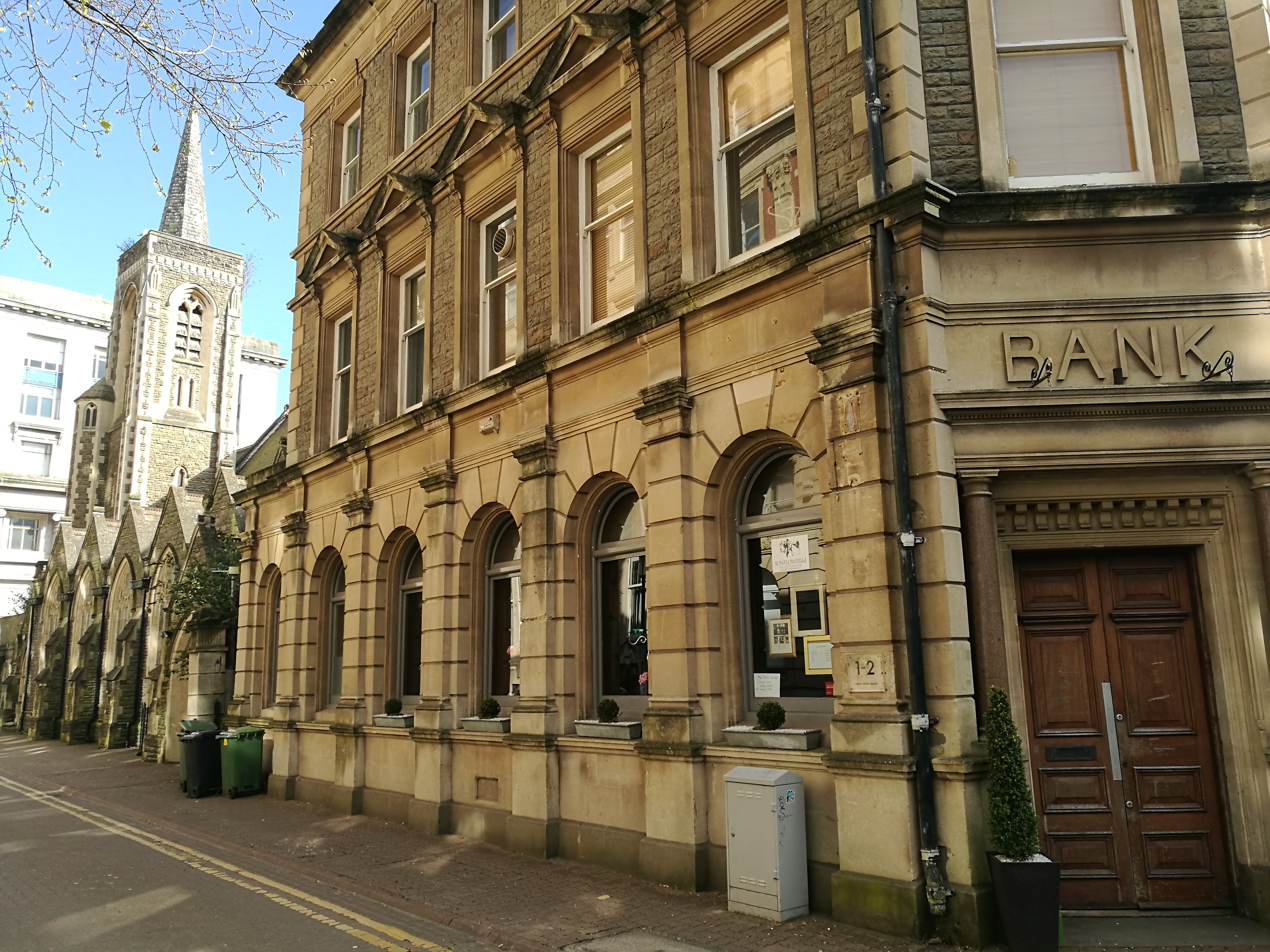
Lloyds Bank Building, with St Stephen's Church in background

- Cambrian Buildings and Cymric Buildings, Grade II Listed Cambrian Buildings developed on site of Bute Town National School between 1907 and 1910. Cymric Buildings developed on an adjoining site to north, in same style, and was completed in 1911. Both were designed by Henry Budgen.
- Aberdare House, Grade II Listed Rebuilt from two houses in 1920 by the architect Henry Budgen. A three-storey building with a 3 bay front in bathstone ashlar with an entrance doorway surround in Portland Stone.
- John Cory & Sons building (Mount Stuart House), Grade II Listed Built 1898 for John Cory & Sons Ltd Ship owners, by H Tudor Thornley, who was also the architect of Beynon House in the square.
- Marine House, Grade II Listed Located at the south western end of the square, the building dates to the late 1850s. It formerly comprised three original houses, two facing north and one facing west onto the entrance lane to square. It was adapted for business use in the late 1800s by E W M Corbett. The building is a significant survivor of the oldest domestic buildings in Mount Stuart Square.
- Lloyds Bank, Grade II Listed Completed in 1891, By E W M Corbett. A three-storey Italianate Bank building in grey coursed stone with bathstone dressings.
- Imperial Buildings The Imperial Hotel was located in the north eastern corner, the building used as the club house for the short-lived Bute United Rowing Club in the late-1880s for ease of access to the Glamorganshire Canal where the club members rowed and held regattas. In 1913 it was replaced by a white tiled five storey structure and "a colonnade of giant Ionic columns" called Imperial Buildings, which housed a range of businesses, predominantly in the fields of shipping, railways, coal, oil, paint and insurance. Government offices occupied the building by the 1940s, and during the WW2 it was the location of the Naval Flag Officer responsible for defending south Wales ports. It was demolished in the 1970s, having been declared to be "in an appalling state for many years".
- Gloucester Chambers Construction began in 1890 of the Bute Docks branch of the County of Gloucester Bank, with the ground floor operating as a bank, and the upper floor, known as Gloucester Chambers, used by coal and shipping companies. The first half of the twentieth century saw the building used as a clothing store owned by Evans Roberts Ltd, and later turf accountants and a filing systems company. It was demolished in 1982.
