= Bute Street, Cardiff =

Street in Cardiff, Wales

Coordinates: 51.4707°N 3.1694°W

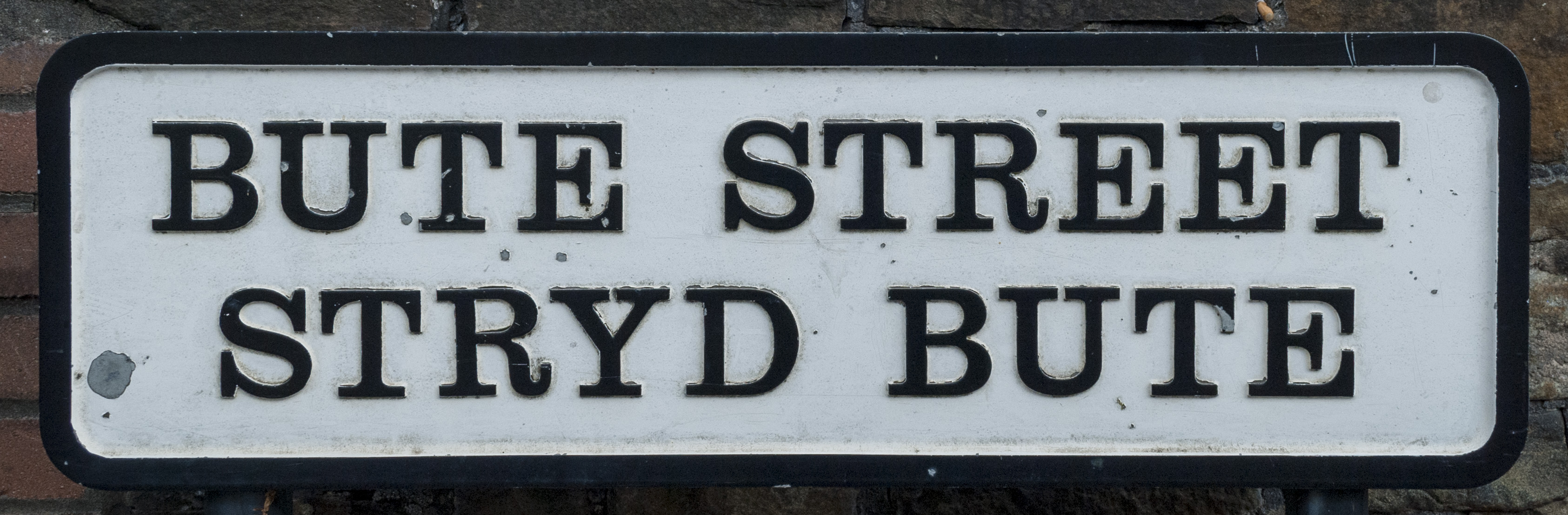
Bilingual English–Welsh street sign on Bute Street

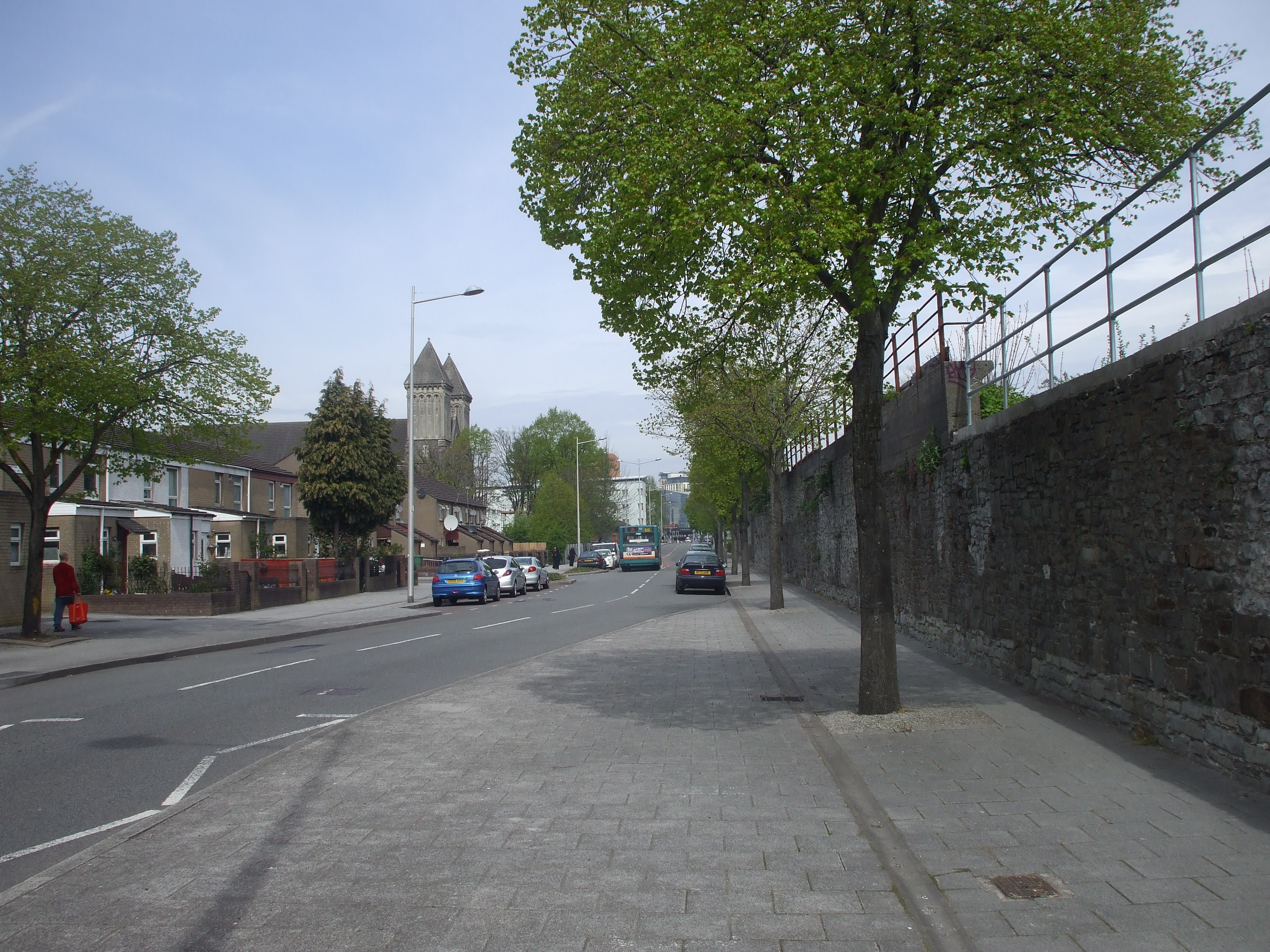
Bute Street with the Butetown Branch Line to the right

Bute Street (Welsh: Stryd Bute) is a street in Cardiff, Wales. It links Cardiff Bay (previously Tiger Bay) and Butetown with Cardiff city centre. It now has no road number. It runs from the dockside of the Mermaid Quay complex in the south, which is now a pedestrian zone, to the junction of Bute Terrace (A4160) in the north.

== History ==
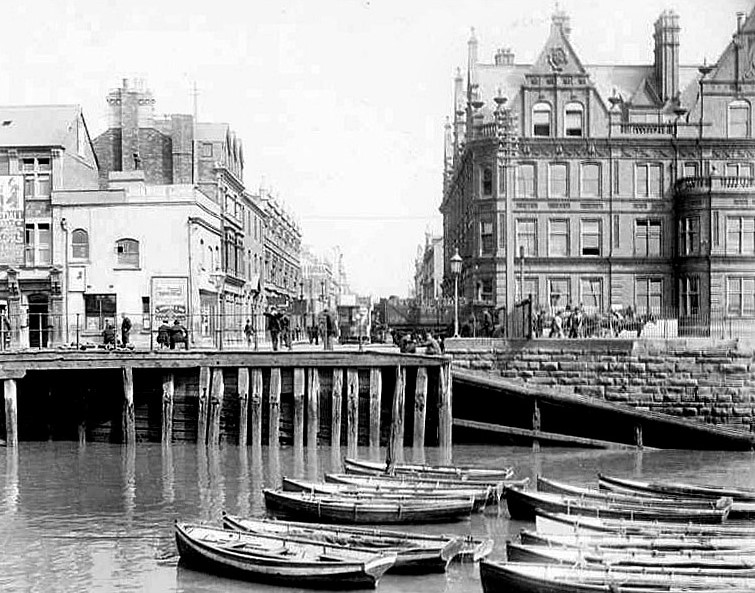
How the southern end of Bute Street once looked

What is today Bute Street was previously mostly meadow and marshland called Soudrey, the Cardiff south moors. The 2nd Marquess of Bute realised in the 1820s that the Glamorganshire Canal was not sufficient to cope with the demands of the iron trade and initiated a development plan. This plan included the construction of Bute Street as a main road in and out of the docks area and it was completed in 1830. Bute Street used to be part of the A470 road, up until Lloyd George Avenue was opened on 4 October 2000, it is now an unclassified road.

== Junctions on Bute Street ==
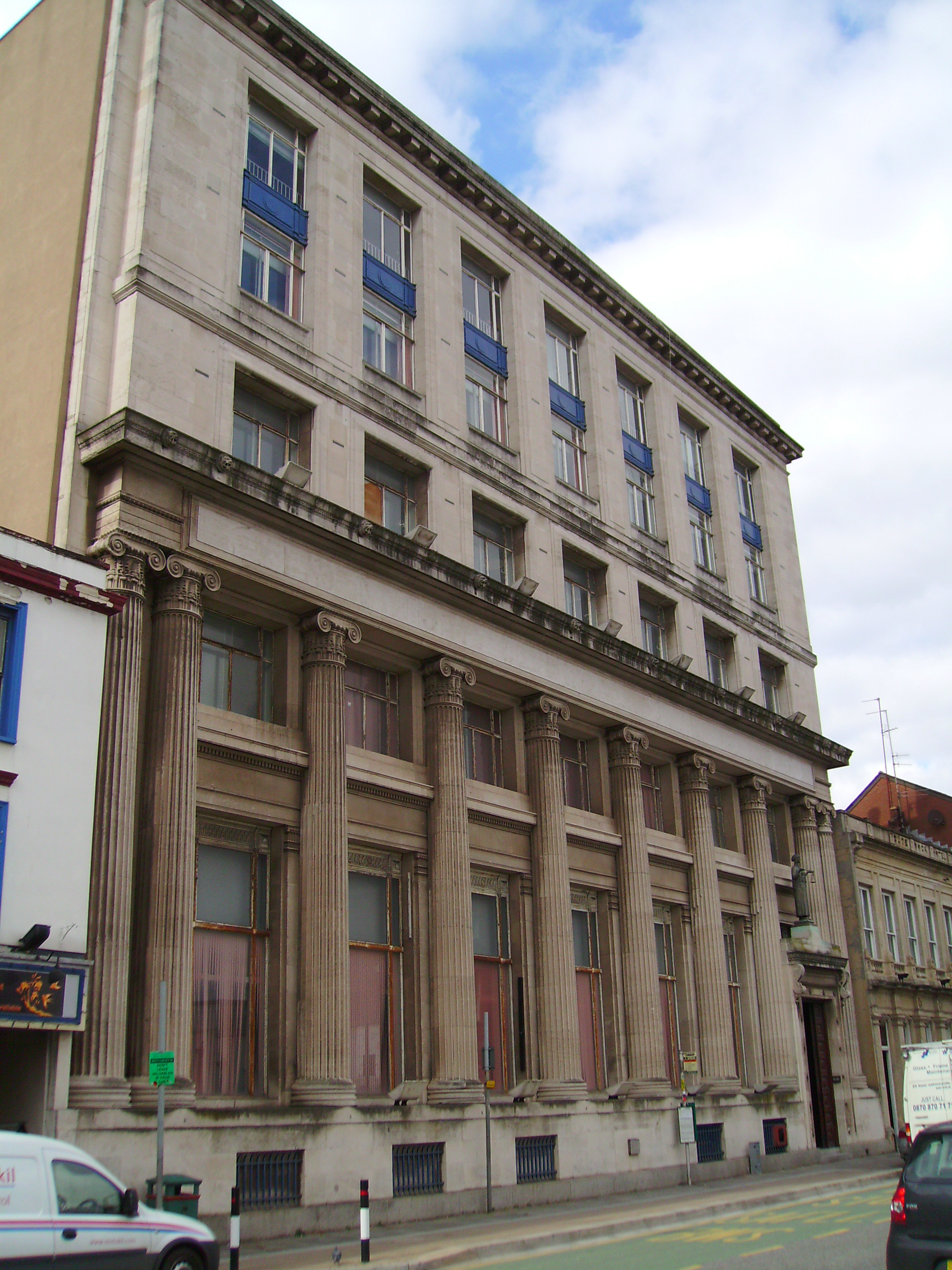
Portland House, 113–116 Bute Street, formerly the National Westminster Bank building

- Bute Terrace and Custom House Street
- Callaghan Square
- North Church Street
- Maria Street
- Loudon Place
- Hodges Row
- Hannah Street
- West Close
- Hemmingway Road
- West Bute Street
- James Street and Bute Place
- Stuart Street

== The notable and listed buildings on Bute Street ==
=== Mermaid Quay ===
The £25 million Mermaid Quay shopping and leisure complex was opened in 1999, it was built on the site of the former Welsh Industrial and Maritime Museum, which was opened in 1977 but closed in 1998 to make way for Mermaid Quay.

=== Cory’s Building (57 Bute Street) ===
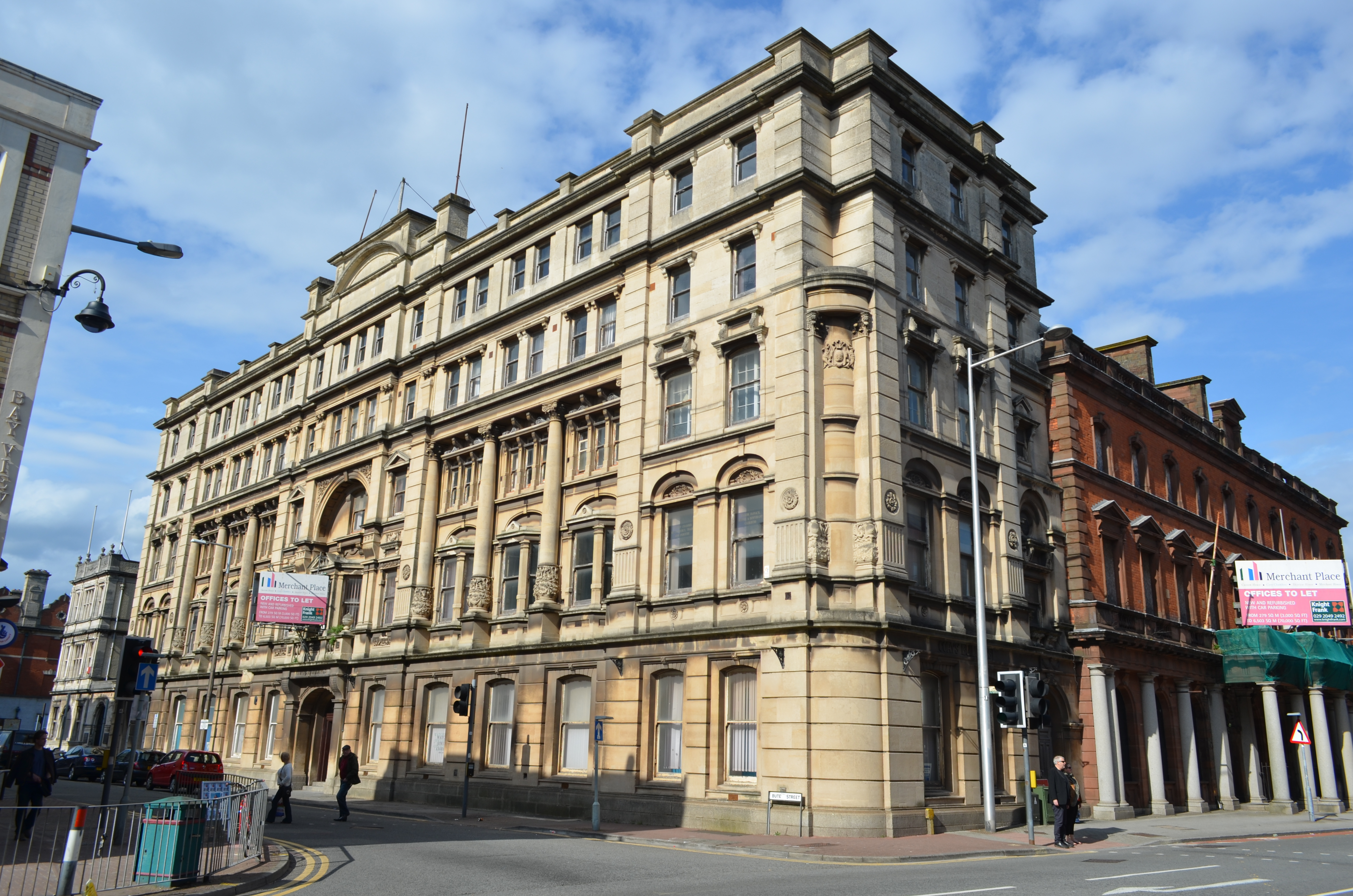
Cory's Building

Cory's Building is a 5-storey grade II listed building situated at the corner of Bute Place and Bute Street. It was built in 1889 and it was built for Cory Brothers & Co. Ltd.

The brothers were John Cory (1828–1910) and Richard Cory (1830–1914). The business included ship's chandlery, brokerage and the sale and export of coal. The company also owned several collieries in Wales. The brothers also became the largest private wagon-owners in the United Kingdom, with over 5,000 wagons.

In July 2018 it was announced that the building is to be redeveloped into apartments and shops by Skyview Estates, who will receive loans of £6m to fund the work, of which £5m will be provided by the Development Bank of Wales and £1m by the Welsh Government's Town Centre Loans fund.

=== Cardiff Bay Railway Station ===
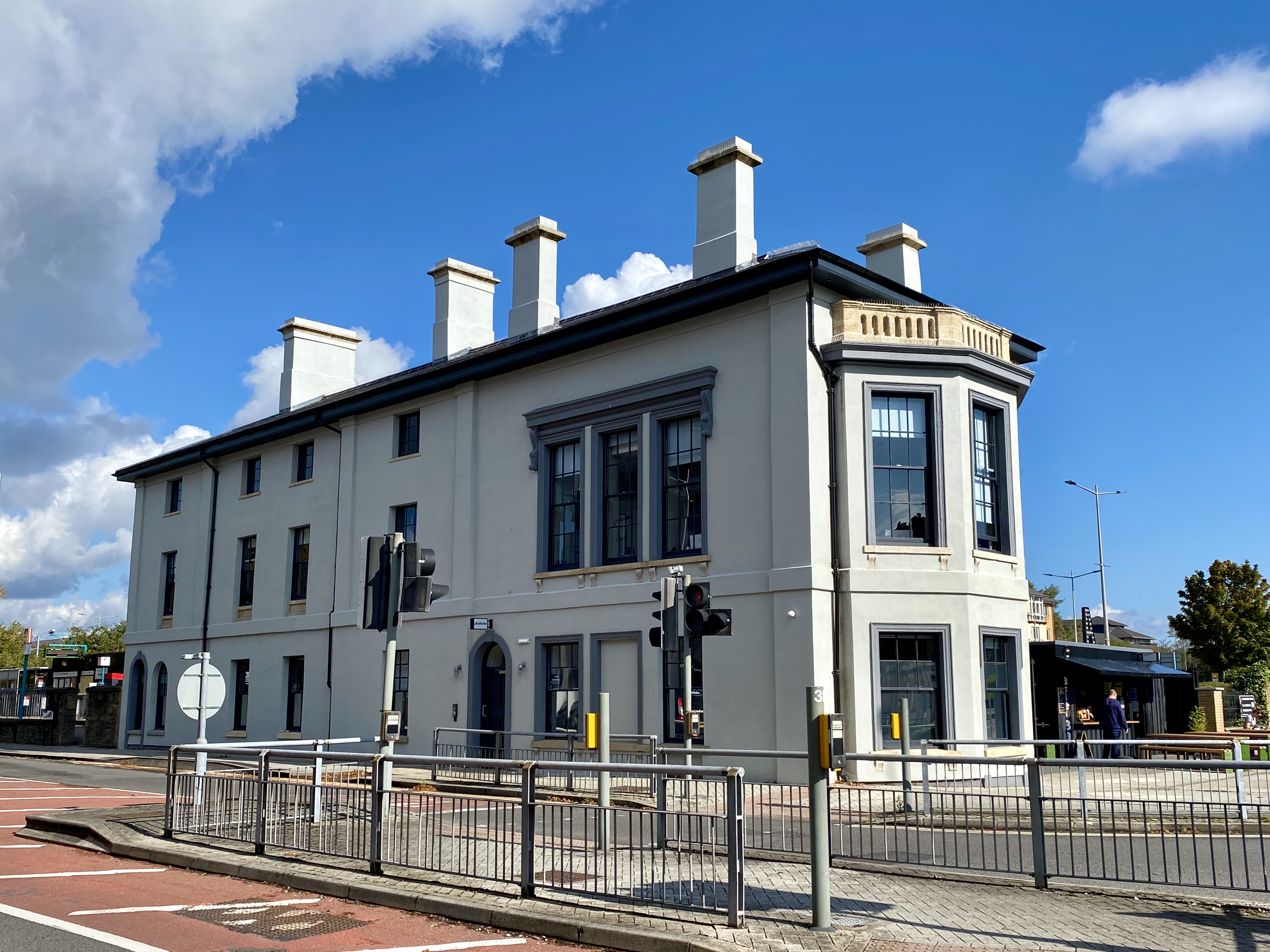
The former Cardiff Bay Railway Station

The Cardiff Bay Railway Station is a Grade II* Listed building, and was built for the historic Taff Vale Railway (TVR) in 1843 and extended in 1860. It was from near this site that the very first train in South Wales ran in October 1840, when the TVR opened the line to Abercynon. Around 1870, the TVR set up its Bute Road headquarters. The station was central to the coal export trade. In 1920, Bute Docks, the TVR and the Cardiff Railway were sold to the Great Western Railway, and for a short time made it the busiest and most important rail system in the world.

=== Church of St. Mary the Virgin and St. Stephen the Martyr ===
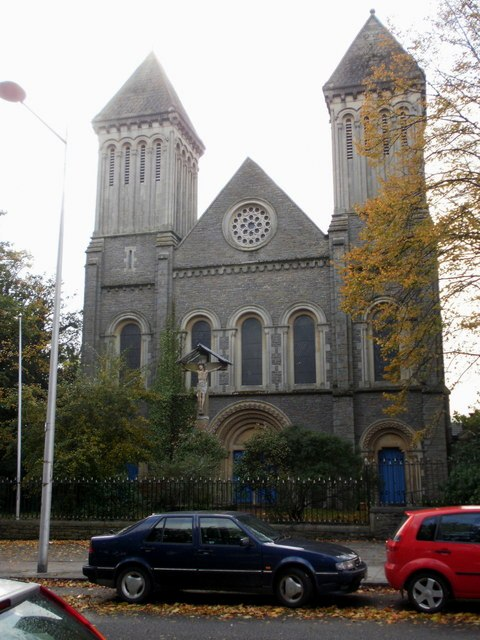
St. Mary the Virgin and
St. Stephen the Martyr

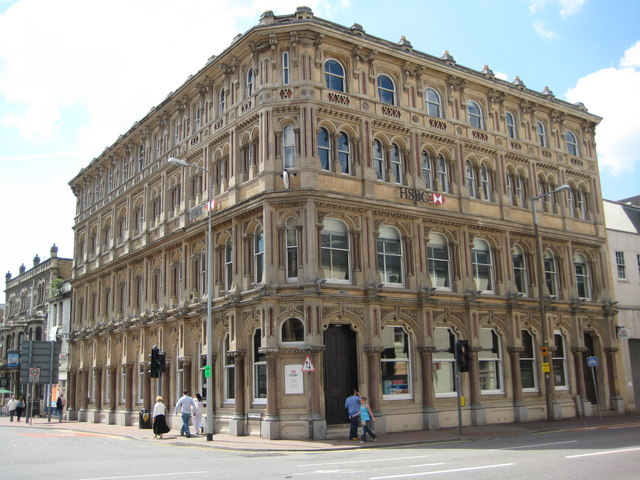
HSBC, 97 Bute Street

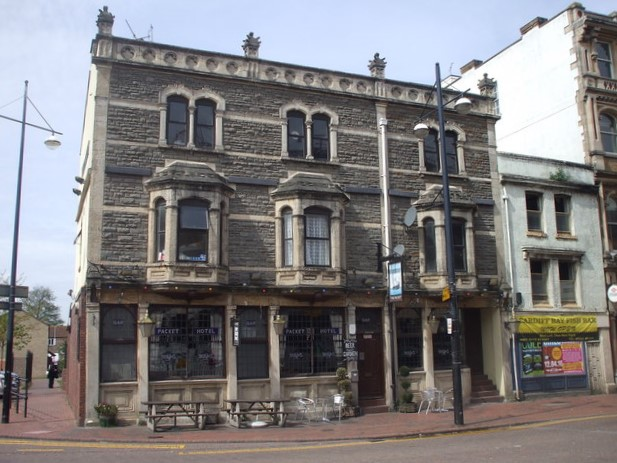
Packet Hotel, 95 Bute Street

St. Mary the Virgin and St. Stephen the Martyr is a grade II listed building and was built in 1843.

=== 97 Bute Street ===
Built in 1874 for Cory Bros coal exporters, the building was later converted to a bank and was occupied by Midland Bank and later HSBC. As of 2022, it has been converted into residential apartments.

=== Other listed buildings ===
- 4 Dock Chambers, Bute Street
- 54 Bute Street, formerly Pascoe House, built in 1875 for Powell Duffryn.
- 54a Bute Street, Meandros House.
- 54b–54c Bute Street.
- 55 Bute Street, Seaway House
- 56 Bute Street. The former Customs & Immigration office, built in 1889
- Portland House, 113–116 Bute Street, previously the National Westminster Bank building, built in 1926–27. This is a Grade II* listed building
- 117 Bute Street, was previously the Docks Non-Political Club and the Baltimore Hotel.
- 122–124 Bute Street, built 1947.
- 125 Bute Street, built in 1847 for Powell Duffryn who later moved to 54 Bute Street. Now used by the Royal Bank of Scotland
- 126 Bute Street, Britannic Buildings.
- Docks Chambers (Emlyn House) built in 1860.

== Notes ==
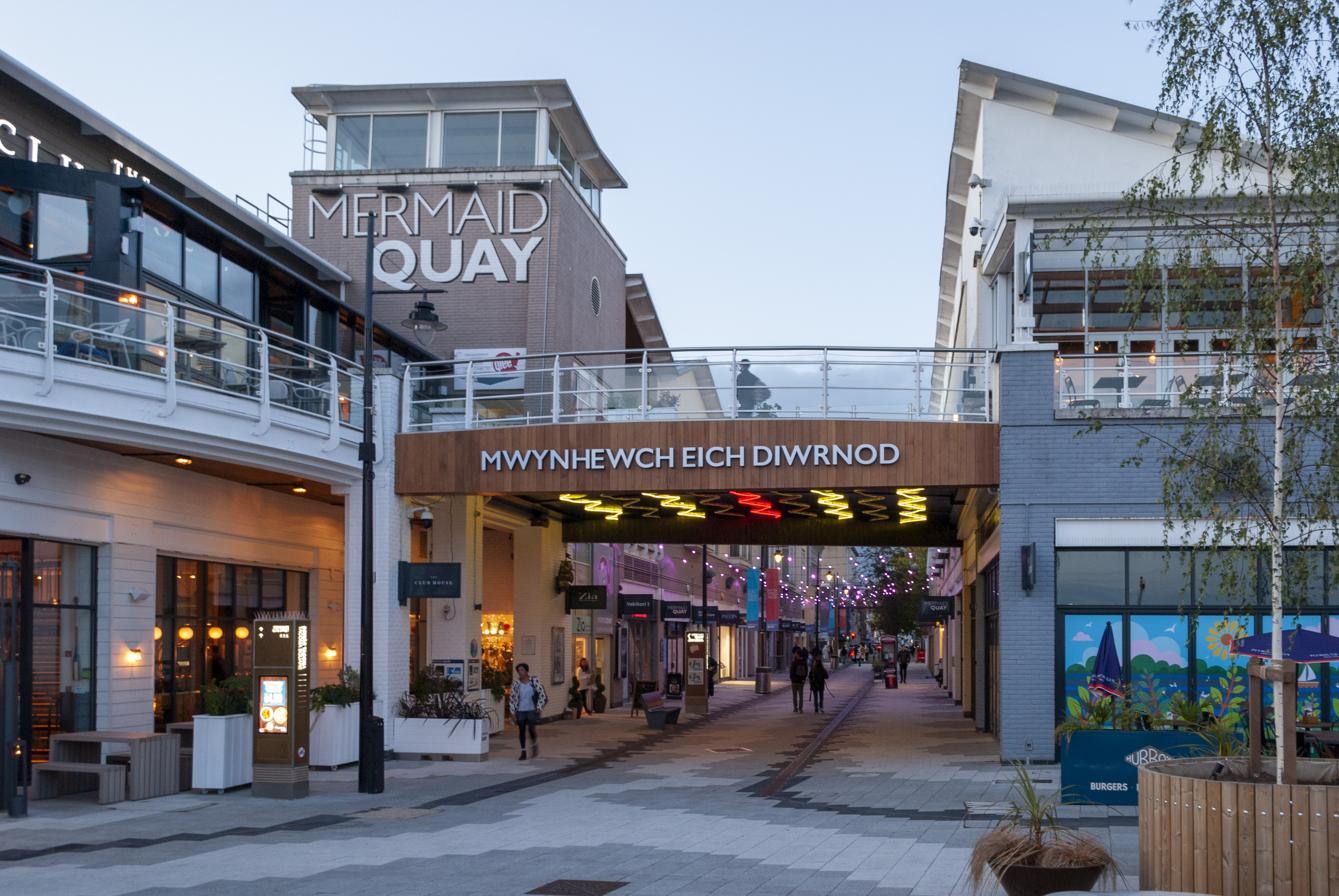
Mermaid Quay at the south end of Bute Street
