= The Cardiff and Merthyr Guardian =

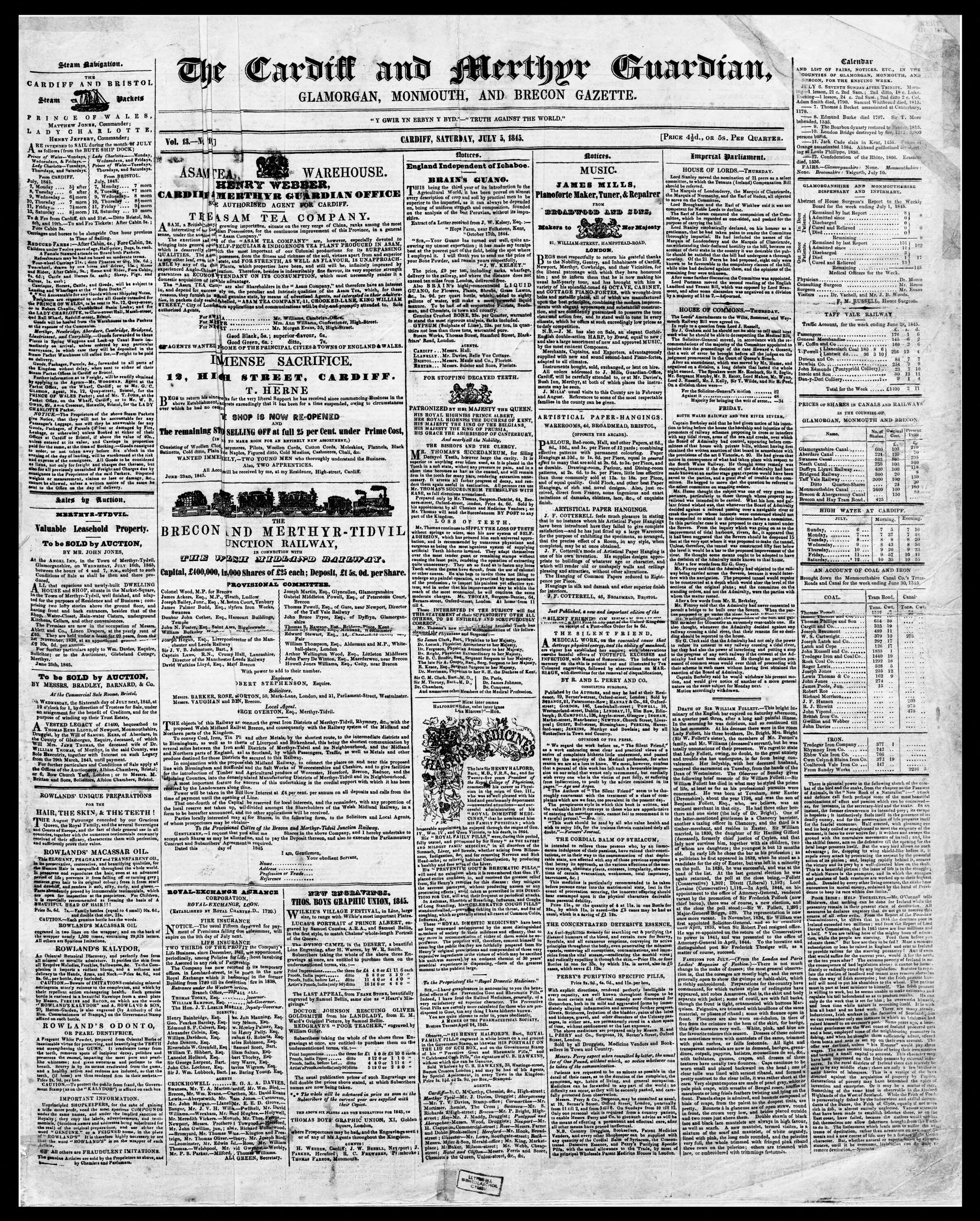
- The Cardiff and Merthyr guardian, Glamorgan, Monmouth, and Brecon gazette
- Type: weekly newspaper
- Publisher: Henry Webber
- Editor: James Emerson Williams[*]
- Launched: 4 January 1845
- City: Cardiff
- Country: Wales
- OCLC number: 751657429

The Cardiff and Merthyr Guardian was a weekly English language newspaper, supportive of conservative politics, which circulated throughout Glamorganshire, Monmouthshire and Breconshire. The newspaper's main content included local news. The paper began life as the Glamorgan, Monmouth and Brecon Gazette and Merthyr Guardian (1832 - 1841) and continued as the Cardiff and Merthyr Guardian until 1874 when it was incorporated into the South Wales Weekly Telegram.
