= Coal Exchange =

The Coal Exchange
- Y Gyfnewidfa Lo
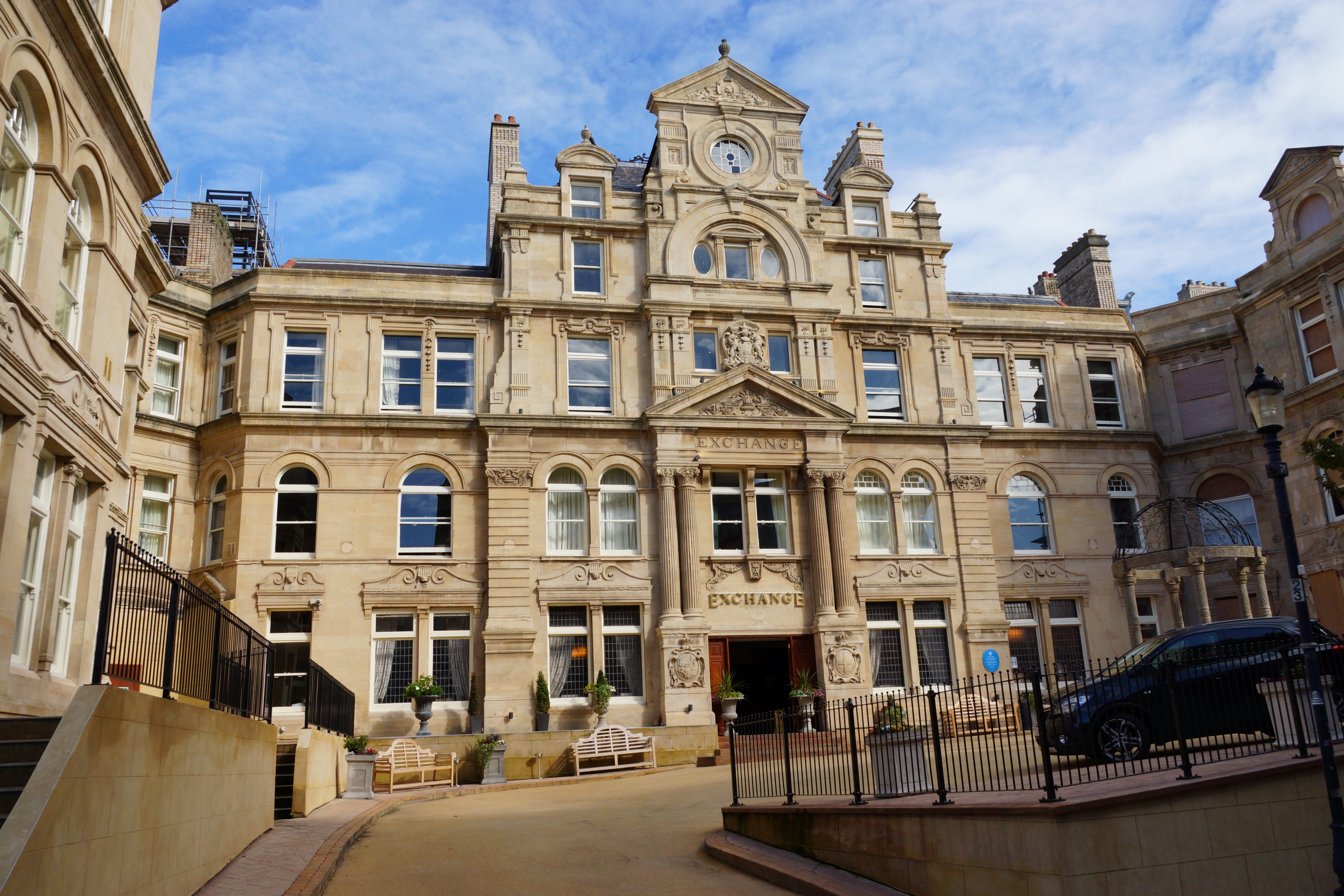

- Location within Cardiff
- Former names: The Coal and Shipping Exchange
- Alternative names: The Exchange Hotel

General information
- Architectural style: French Renaissance
- Location: Cardiff, Wales
- Coordinates: 51.46544°N 3.1682°W
- Construction started: 1884
- Completed: 1888

Design and construction
- Architects: Seward & Thomas

Listed Building – Grade II*
- Official name: Cardiff Exchange Building
- Designated: 19 May 1975
- Reference no.: 13744

The Coal Exchange (also known as the Exchange Building) is a historic building in Cardiff, Wales. It is designed in Renaissance Revival style. Built in 1888 as the Coal and Shipping Exchange to be used as a market floor and office building for trading in coal in Cardiff, it later became a hub of the global coal trade. It is situated in Mount Stuart Square in Butetown, and was for many years the hub of the city's prosperous shipping industry.

It later became a music venue, with offices remaining in use in the West Wing, before being closed indefinitely in 2013 due to building safety issues. Following a series of proposals to demolish the building, Cardiff Council purchased the Coal Exchange. In 2016 the property was sold to the Liverpool-based hospitality company Signature Living, which began a programme of restoration and conversion of the building into a hotel.

During the COVID-19 pandemic, the company Signature Living entered administration leaving the future of the building in limbo. During the summer of 2020, the Coal Exchange Hotel was saved by Cardiff-based company Eden Grove Properties, who reopened the hotel during September 2020 with no affiliation to the former owners Signature Living. After just two weeks the hotel was forced to close again inline with the firebreak lockdown in Wales to help stop the spread of COVID-19. The hotel was to reopen during 2021, with the new owners seeking to redevelop the building's facilities.

== History ==
=== Construction and early history ===
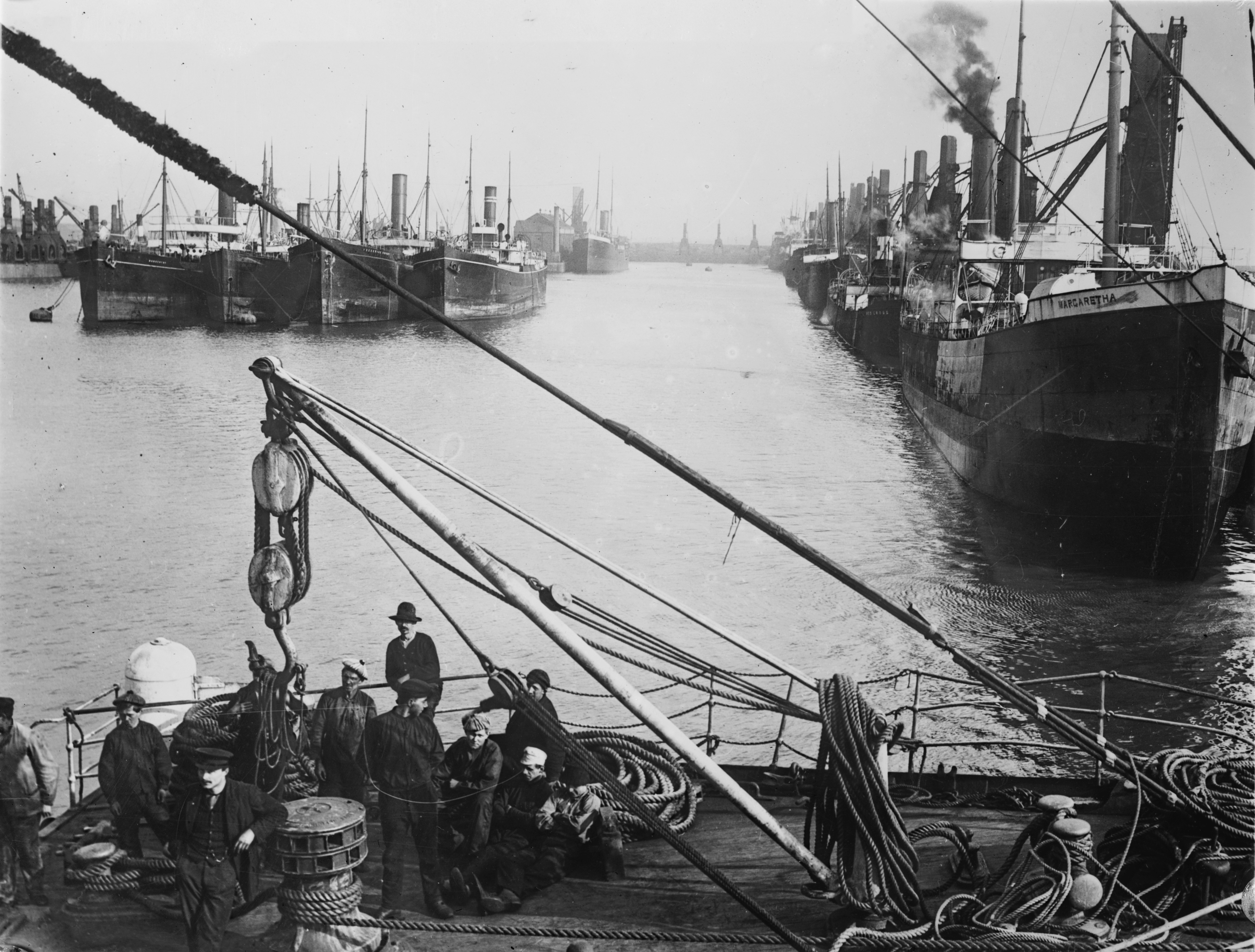
Coal ships tied up at Cardiff Docks in the 1910s

Before the Coal Exchange was built in Mount Stuart Square, the area was a residential square with a central garden. It was taken over by commerce as the city grew in prosperity. Built to provide a dedicated location for merchants and traders to sell coal, it followed construction of buildings of a similar function in London, Liverpool and Manchester. Prior to its construction, coal merchants used to chalk up the changing prices of coal on slates outside their offices or struck deals in the local public houses. It was built and opened in stages, the central trading hall and east block completed first. The trading hall was a large central space around which suites of offices were located. The London and Provincial Banking Company occupied the majority of the north side.

As Cardiff became the biggest coal port in the world, the building was constructed between 1884 and 1888 by Edwin Seward as a base from which to conduct trade negotiations regarding the coal mines of the South Wales Valleys – most of which was shipped to Cardiff for distribution.

The building played an important role in the industrial Cardiff of the 19th century. Paired Corinthian columns, an oak balcony, and rich wood panelling adorn the trading hall, which was reconstructed by Edwin Seward in 1911.

Following its opening, coal owners, ship owners and their agents met daily on the floor of the trading hall where agreements were made by word of mouth and telephone. During the peak trading hour of midday to one o'clock, the floor might have as many as 200 men gesticulating and shouting. It was estimated that up to 10,000 people would pass in and out of the building each day. At one time the price of the world's coal was determined here. It was at the Coal Exchange that the first ever £1,000,000 deal was agreed in 1904. The building interior was lavishly refurbished in 1912 by Edwin Seward, and reopened as the ‘New Exchange Building’. In 1915, an extension was added to the southern section, connected to the trading hall.

=== Post-war period ===
Cardiff's reliance on coal made the Bute Docks highly vulnerable to any downturn in the demand for it. With the end of the war the docks went into further decline. The Coal Exchange closed in 1958 and coal exports came to an end in 1964. The southern extension was demolished in the 1970s. The building became Grade II* listed in 1975.

In 1979 the Coal Exchange was earmarked as a future home of the proposed Welsh Assembly and a heavily reinforced underground carpark was constructed (also envisaged to act as a nuclear shelter) but the plan for devolution was rejected by the Welsh people in a referendum.

In 1983 the building was considered as a headquarters for the Welsh language television station, S4C, though this also failed to take off. The Exchange Hall was used with great regularity during this period as a filming location for various parts of the entertainment industry, for example the BBC drama Bevan.

=== Re-opening and closure ===
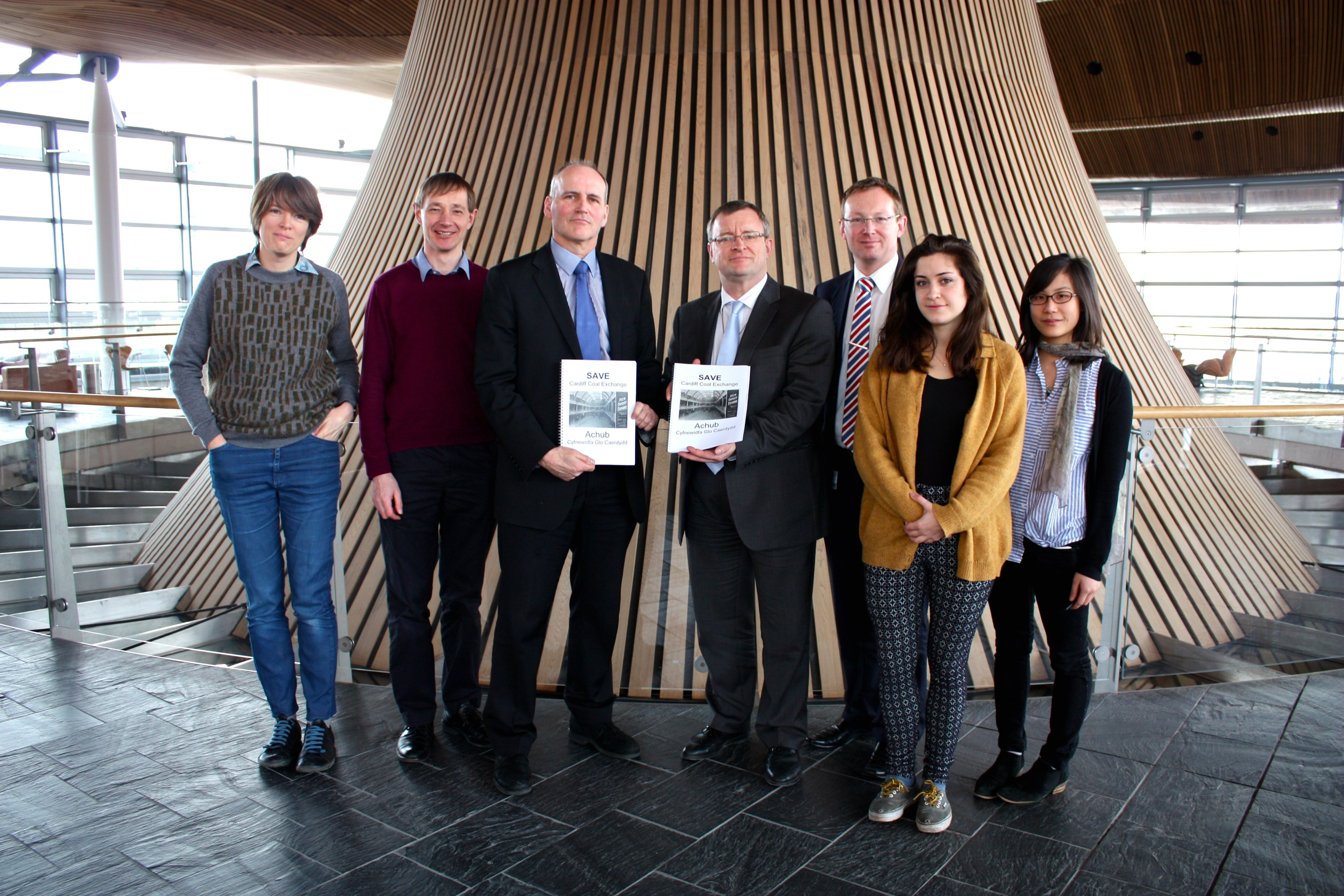
A 'Save the Cardiff Coal Exchange' petition being presented at the Welsh Assembly in 2014

In 1988 the building was re-acquired and subsequently completely refurbished in 2001 to turn it into a major venue. The venue hosted acts such as the Arctic Monkeys, Manic Street Preachers, Ocean Colour Scene, John Cale, Lostprophets, Stereophonics, Van Morrison and Biffy Clyro.

The Coal Exchange closed on 7 August 2013 as a result of building safety issues. With the subsequent liquidation of the company which owned it in 2014, ownership of the Coal Exchange passed to the Crown Estate. It then became the subject of efforts to preserve the historic fabric of the building by the not-for-profit organisation Save the Coal Exchange Limited. In February 2015, Welsh Government Economy Minister Edwina Hart commissioned a feasibility study into future re-use of the building. In May 2015 it was confirmed that the exchange would be used for filming of the remake of The Crow. In 2016, filmmaker Nick Broomfield visited the building as part of his documentary Going Going Gone, which investigated the deterioration and heritage of the Coal Exchange.

=== The Exchange Hotel ===
In 2016 it was announced that the building was to be fully refurbished as a hotel by Liverpool-based private company Signature Living, with a museum detailing the history of the building and of the Cardiff Docks. The proposal received some opposition, including from the Victorian Society and MP Stephen Doughty. Cardiff council granted planning permission in July 2016. In June 2017, the BBC broadcast a documentary entitled Saving The Coal Exchange, which looked at the development of the building into a hotel. As part of the phased restoration programme, rooms were opened as works were completed. The first 30 rooms of the hotel opened in May 2017. This was followed by a further 30 rooms in both June and September 2017, bringing the total to 50.

=== The Coal Exchange Hotel ===
During the COVID-19 pandemic, the company Signature Living entered administration leaving the future of the building in limbo. During the summer of 2021, the Coal Exchange Hotel was saved by Cardiff-based company Eden Grove Properties, the company saved 56 jobs and reopened the hotel during September 2020 with no affiliation to the former owners Signature Living. After just two weeks the hotel was forced to close again inline with the firebreak lockdown in Wales to help stop the spread of COVID-19. The hotel was to reopen during 2021 and the new owners were in the latter stages of completing the legal documents with the relevant companies to commence work on the rear and underground section of the building with hopes to complete the building towards the end of 2021-start of 2022. Once fully completed the hotel would host 146 bedrooms, an on-site restaurant and bar, spa, gym, learning zone, conference rooms and the Grand Hall wedding venue.

== Design ==
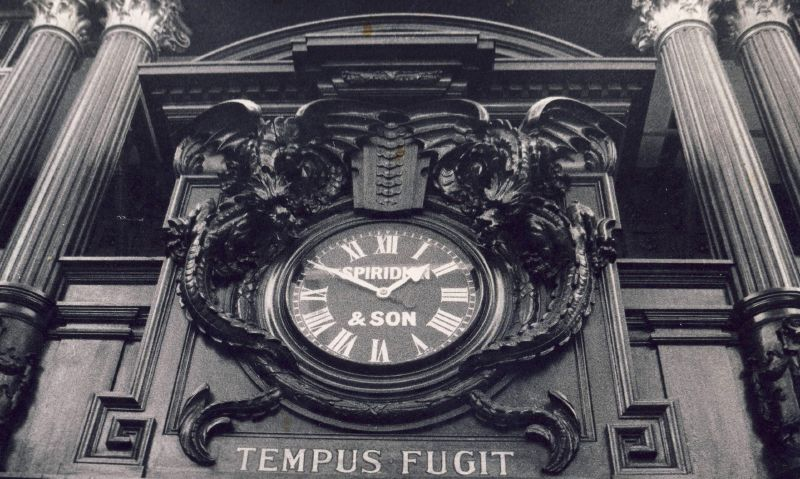
Clock inside the trading hall

The building is constructed largely in limestone, in the French Renaissance style. The exterior is made of pale Corsham stone on three sides, with yellow brick on the western elevation. The roof is slate, topped with multiple chimneys mainly in yellow brick. Its style was derived from French Renaissance models. The main entrance front faces south. The building is made up of three storeys and basement, plus attic storeys in the central pedimented 'frontispiece', with a hipped pavilion roof. The entrance is guarded by a pair of fluted Corinthian columns, and topped by a floral relief in a triangular pediment surmounted by Royal Arms. On the north east corner, steps lead up to a projecting porch which housed Barclays Bank, resident here since building opened.

The interior retains an entrance hall with a Jacobethan style moulded plaster ceiling, panelled walls, and woodblock and inlay floor. At the rear are two lions on high plinths supporting clock faces showing times of Cardiff high tides. The central Coal and Shipping Hall dominates the building, surrounded by galleried tiers, in Jacobethan style dark wood. A false ceiling has reduced the height to 2 storeys, hiding a centrally glazed roof.

== In the media ==
The grand ballroom was used as the set for the BBC2 series, Chess Masters: The Endgame. The first series aired in March and April 2025.

== Access ==
Coal Exchange is served by Cardiff Bay railway station and Cardiff Bus service 7, 8, 35, and Baycar.

== See also ==
- List of cultural venues in Cardiff
- Mining in Wales
- Music of Cardiff
- South Wales Coalfield
