= Gaynor Legall =

Welsh activist and politician

Gaynor Legall CBE
- Born: February 1950 (age 76); Cardiff, Wales
- Title: City councillor
- Term: 1983–1991
- Successor: Betty Campbell

Gaynor Antoinette LeGaulle CBE (born February 1950), better known as Gaynor Legall, is a Welsh campaigner and activist who is a founder of the Wales Anti-Apartheid Movement and chaired a 2020 audit on monuments linked to the slave trade within Wales. She served as a councillor within Cardiff, becoming the first black councillor for a city within Wales.

== Personal life and education ==
Legall was born in February 1950, at St David's Hospital, Cardiff, Wales. She grew up during the 1956 redevelopment of Tiger Bay and attended South Church Street, in Butetown. Legall was raised by her mother and an uncle who was a surrogate father to her. As a child, she attended the Cardiff's children's group The Rainbow Club, where she met Shirley Bassey in 1957, before she began her first world tour.

Growing up, her grandmother and great aunt told her stories of the 1919 South Wales race riots. The two sisters lived in Tiger Bay at the time and barricaded themselves in their home to avoid rioters, stockpiling rocks in case they needed to throw them as protection. They sewed pockets into the men's clothing, so they could hide knives and guns within them. Reflecting on her family's experiences, Legall has said she grew up with a deep set distrust of officials, and that the riot had left the community with a lingering sense of fear.

== Political career ==
Legall served as a councillor for the Butetown electoral ward of Cardiff City Council from 1983 to 1991, serving as a member of the Labour Party. She was the first black councillor for a city within Wales.

== Further work ==
Legall has worked in a variety of social care roles, including as a nurse and a social worker.

She was a member of Black Alliance, an Anti-Apartheid group based in Cardiff that was founded in 1969. She recalled a protest the Black Alliance held in 1969, in Cardiff, where police arrested all the black men. The mounted police then began herding people down side-streets and Legall was only able to avoid arrest when a woman in a nearby house gave them refuge. Legall went on to organise with Hanef Bhamjee, and was a founding member of Wales Anti-apartheid Movement (WAAM) in 1981.

In 1987 Legall was involved in the four part film series, Struggles for Black Communities. Made by Colin Prescod, the films were commissioned by the Institute of Race Relations and aired on Channel 4.

In 1988, she founded AWETU, which means "our unity" in Swahili. It was the first black led mental health charity in Wales and it was the only mental health group that supported minority ethnic people in Wales until its merger with the Cardiff & Vale Coalition of Disabled People in 2011. The two groups then become Diverse Cymru. AWETU provided an advocacy and befriending services, drop in groups, and training services for authorities to help them understand the specific mental health struggles minority ethnic groups may face.

She established FullEmploy Wales in 1989. The organisation was a Welsh specific sister organisation to FullEmploy, which aimed to place black and minority ethnic young adults into suitable job roles. The organisation later renamed to become Newemploy, before closing in 2001.

In 1995, she helped found BAWSO, a charity focused on supporting black and minority ethnic domestic abuse survivors in Wales. The charity runs refuges, offers support in the community, and a 24-hour helpline.

In July 2020 the First Minister of Wales, Mark Drakeford formed a group to audit street names, building names, and public monuments that were linked to the British slave trade. This came after a month of Black Lives Matter protests. Legall was appointed as the chair of the group.

The group's findings were published in November 2020, in The Slave Trade and The British Empire Report. The audit found that over 200 buildings, monuments, and street names across Wales were named in commemoration of people directly linked to the slave trade. These commemorations rarely addressed any connections to slavery. The findings also highlighted the lack of commemorations for black and Asian people within Wales. To potentially address this, the report identified 41 historically significant Welsh black people who could be commemorated in the future.

Following the report, Legall explained that the group intentionally choose not to make recommendations around the commemorations, instead believing that decisions around them should be made by the people to who live near them. Commenting on what she wanted to see, Legall hoped that the audit would help educate younger generations on where Welsh wealth came from, and hoped to see more commemorations for people of colour.

In October 2020 Legall spoke about her experience growing up as a black woman in Wales, in the BBC documentary Black and Welsh by Liana Stewart.

She was involved in the Picture Post: A Twentieth Century Icon, a 2025 National Museum Cardiff exhibition that focused on photography from the 1930s to the 1950s. Legall helped select photographs that represented Tiger Bay.

Legall sits on the committee boards of a variety of organisations including The Heritage & Cultural Exchange, a Cardiff based community organisation that archives the history of Tiger Bay. She is also an honorary vice chair of LLafur, an organisation formed in 1970 to promote the people's history of Wales. Previously Legall served as a director of Butetown History and Arts Centre, which announced it's planned closure in 2016. She is a board member of Diverse Excellence Cymru and a non-executive member of Cadw's board.

Legall was a member of the Cardiff Bay Rugby Codebreakers committee, which campaigned and fundraised to create a statue celebrating sportsmen from Cardiff Bay. The committee erected the Codebreakers Statue in Cardiff Bay in July 2023. It was the first statue within Wales that featured non-fictionalised, and named black men.

== Awards ==
In 2017, Legall was awarded the Lifetime Achievement Award by the Ethnic Minority Welsh Women Achievement Association.

In 2023, she was awarded an honorary award from the Open University. She was also a candidate for a BLAC Award UK in 2023.

In December 2024 Legall was awarded the Order of the British Empire for her public service and anti-racism work within Wales.
