= Listed buildings in Cardiff Bay =

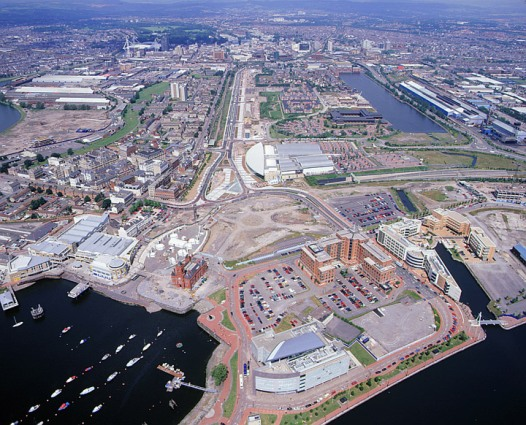
Aerial view of Cardiff Bay area (early 2000s); Bute East Dock in the background, the Bay and Roath Basin in the foreground

There are many listed buildings in Cardiff Bay, part of Cardiff, capital city of Wales. A listed building is one considered to be of special architectural, historical or cultural significance, and has restrictions on amendments or demolition. Buildings are listed as either Grade I, II* and II buildings lists, with the Grade I being the most important.

Cardiff Bay describes the redeveloped docklands area of the city, including the neighbourhoods of Butetown and Atlantic Wharf, previously better known as Tiger Bay. It is bounded approximately by the River Taff to the west, the Bute East Dock to the east and the mainline railway to the north.

== Key ==
Grade	Criteria
Grade I	Buildings of exceptional, usually national, interest (generally the top 2%).
Grade II*	Particularly important buildings of more than special interest.
Grade II	Buildings of special interest, which warrant every effort being made to preserve them.

== Grade I and II* listed buildings ==
Name	Photograph	Grade	Date	Location	Description
Pierhead Building, Harbour Drive	Pierhead Building	I	1897	Cardiff Bay; 51.4631°N 3.1622°W	Designed by architect William Frame and built from terracotta supplied from North Wales. The building was used by the Bute Dock Company and later the Cardiff Railway Company. Now converted for use as an information and exhibition facility.
Cardiff Bay railway station, Bute Street	Cardiff Bay station	II*	1840	Butetown; 51.4666°N 3.1652°W	
Coal Exchange Building, Mount Stuart Square	Coal Exchange	II*	1886	Cardiff Bay; 51.4650°N 3.1670°W	
Empire House, Mount Stuart Square	Empire House	II*	1926	Cardiff Bay; 51.4654°N 3.1665°W	A five-storey Georgian style building with two additional attic levels, designed by Percy Thomas and Ivor Jones.
Portland House, former National Westminster Bank building, Bute Street	Former NatWest Bank	II*	1927	Cardiff Bay; 51.4650°N 3.1651°W	

== Grade II listed buildings ==
Name	Photograph	Grade	Date	Location	Description
Aberdare House, Mount Stuart Square	Aberdare House	II		Cardiff Bay; 51.4647°N 3.1679°W	Offices created from two 3-storey houses in 1920.
Baltic House, Mount Stuart Square	Baltic House	II	1915	Cardiff Bay; 51.4644°N 3.1670°W	A six-storey building designed by Teather and Wilson in an Edwardian Baroque style. Baltic House faces the main entrance to the Cardiff Coal Exchange.
Bonded Warehouse, Atlantic Wharf	Bonded Warehouse	II	1861	Atlantic Wharf; 51.4760°N 3.1642°W	Four storey brick warehouse building at one end of the Bute East Dock. Constructed using an iron frame. Converted into office accommodation during the 1980s.
Church of St Mary and St Stephen, Bute Street	St Mary's	II	1843	Butetown; 51.4732°N 3.1711°W	Church designed by John Foster of Liverpool, with a later addition by Arts and Crafts architect J. D. Sedding.
Cory's Building, Bute Street	Cory's Building	II	1889	Cardiff Bay; 51.4646°N 3.1645°W	Designed by Cardiff architects Bruton & Williams in a Free Italianate Classical style. The five-storey building has internal staircases with iron balustrades.
Eli Jenkins, Bute Crescent	Eli Jenkins	II	c. 1860s	Cardiff Bay; 51.4637°N 3.1639°W	Mid nineteenth Century, with metal railings.
'D Shed', The Flourish	D Shed	II	1870s	Cardiff Bay	The building marked on First Edition Ordnance Survey map (surveyed 1870s) as warehouse beside Bute East Dock Basin. Known as the "D" Shed, it was dismantled in the 1990s, and re-assembled on its present site, opening as Craft in the Bay in June 2002
Locky's Cottage, Harbour Drive	Locky's Cottage	II		Cardiff Bay; 51.4613°N 3.1595°W	Small stone hut near Roath Basin.
Midland (HSBC) Bank, James Street/Bute Street	Midland Bank	II	1874	Cardiff Bay; 51.4641°N 3.1648°W	Designed by F. Cutlan in a Venetian style, using Bathstone and yellow brick.
Mount Stuart Graving Docks, Stuart Street	Graving Dock	II	c. 1880s	Cardiff Bay; 51.4616°N 3.1658°W	Three ship-repairing docks opening into Cardiff Bay.
The Big Windsor (now the 'Spice Merchant'), Stuart Street	Previously known as The Big Windsor	II	1855	Cardiff Bay; 51.4624°N 3.1656°W	Public house established in 1855 and now trading as an Indian restaurant.

== See also ==
- Listed buildings in Cardiff
- Architecture of Cardiff

== Sources ==
- Butetown, Cardiff, BritishListedBuildings.co.uk
- Mount Stuart Square: Conservation Area Appraisal (PDF), Strategic Planning & Environment, Cardiff Council (2009)
- Royal Commission on the Ancient and Historical Monuments of Wales (RCAHMW) website listings
