= Neil Sinclair (historian) =

Welsh historian (1944–2019)

Neil Sinclair (1944 - 2019) was a Welsh historian and writer. He is best known for chronicling the docklands area in Cardiff and its redevelopment in the 1960s.

Sinclair was born in the Tiger Bay area of Cardiff in 1944. He left Wales in his twenties to live in London and later the US, where he studied for a bachelor’s and master’s degree at the University of California, Berkeley. He also travelled within Africa and Mexico. After experiencing a homesickness for his birth nation he returned to Wales in the 1980s, where he would live until his death in 2019.

He published two books on the Tiger Bay area and its 1960s redevelopment, The Tiger Bay Story (1993) and Endangered Tiger (2003). He was highly critical of the redevelopment scheme, describing it in 2016 as a "tragedy", and accusing it of creating a "lacklustre council estate; an architectural monstrosity". He objected to the characterization of Tiger Bay as crime-ridden and dangerous, arguing that it had been used as justification for the area's destruction and subsequent rebuilding.

Sinclair was also interested in the African diaspora in Wales. He was influenced by the postwar multi-ethnic community of Tiger Bay, which he described as a 'utopian microcosm of social harmony'. From a mixed white-black background, he used his Welsh and African heritage to help shape Afro-Celtic identity. He worked alongside the BBC to explore the history of black American GIs stationed in the Welsh valleys during World War Two. His 2016 novel Is the Bible African History argued that numerous Biblical characters have origins in African mythology.

In 1999 he stood in the Cardiff Council election as the Plaid Cymru candidate for Butetown. He came third with 13.6% of the vote.

Sinclair appeared briefly in the 1959 film Tiger Bay when he was still a child in Cardiff, in a scene alongside Hayley Mills. He was the only Cardiffian to have a speaking role in the film.
