= Olive Salaman =

Welsh community leader (1921–2007)

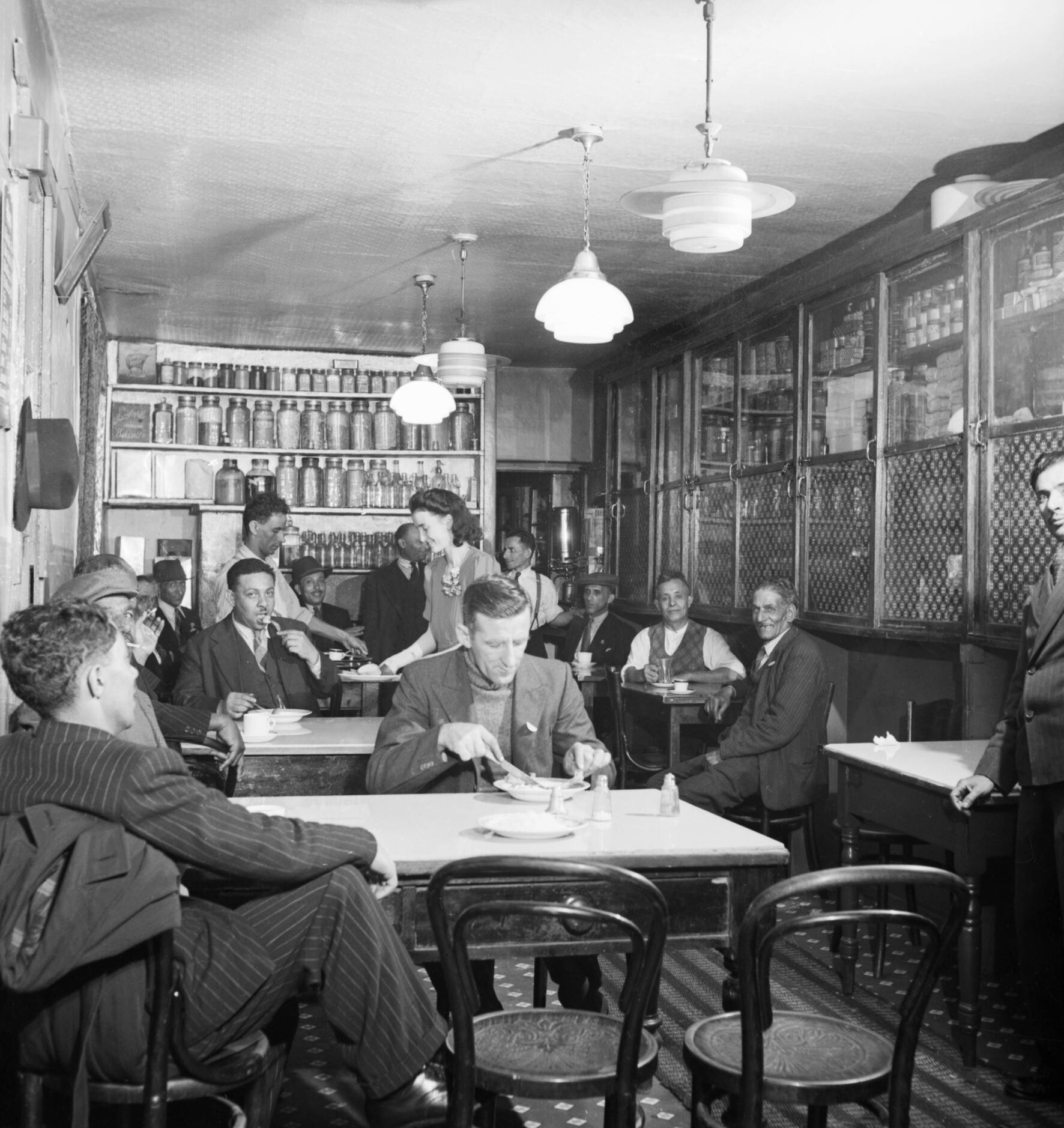
- Salaman serving customers at the Cairo Café, 1943
- Born: Olive May Beverly-Walls; 3 March 1921; Tredegar, Gwent, Wales
- Died: 28 December 2007 (aged 86); Cardiff, Wales
- Citizenship: United Kingdom
- Occupation: Community activist
- Years active: 1940–2007
- Spouse: Ali Salaman (married 1937–1965; his death)
- Children: 24

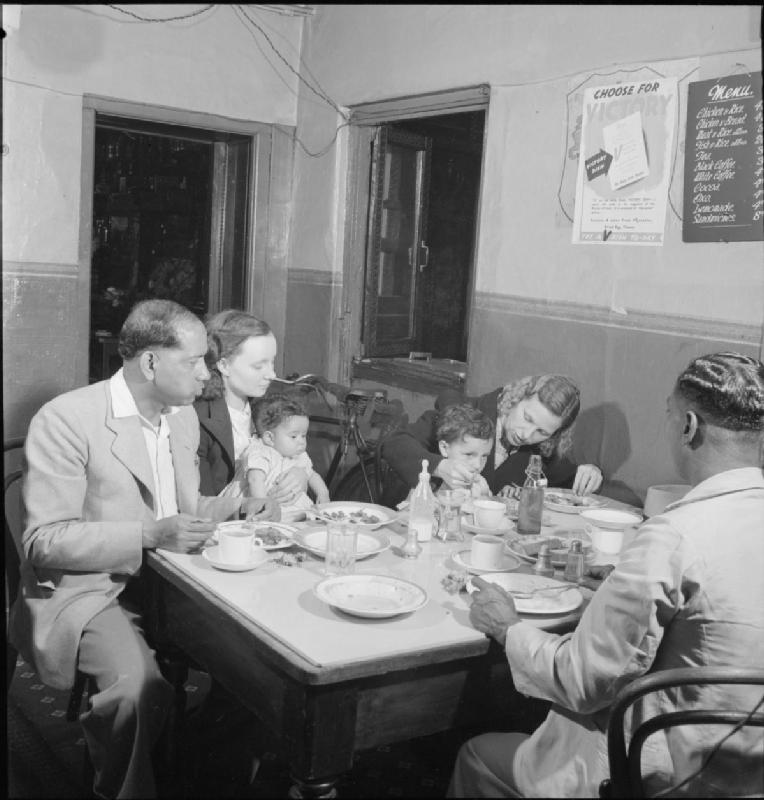
A family dining at the Cairo Café in 1943

Olive May Salaman (née Beverly-Walls; 3 March 1921 – 28 December 2007) was a Welsh community activist. For 20 years, she co-owned the Cairo Café in Cardiff, which became a centre of the city's various ethnic minority groups, in particular the Muslim community, which led to her being given the nickname the "mother of Cardiff Yemenis" and being named as one of the most influential early female converts to Islam in the United Kingdom.

== Biography ==
=== Early life ===
Salaman grew up in a working class Welsh-speaking home in Tredegar, Gwent. She was raised in the Methodist religion. As a child, she and her family moved to Penygraig in the Rhondda Valley. In 1936, at the age of 15, Salaman moved to Cardiff to train as a nurse at the Cardiff Royal Infirmary.

In 1937, Salaman met Ali Salaman when she became lost after leaving a cinema and asked him for directions. Ali was originally from Zabid in what was then the Kingdom of Yemen, and, having been orphaned as a child, emigrated to the United Kingdom at the age of 18. After three weeks together, they got married after Salaman converted to Islam. Their initial marriage was likely an Islamic one, as their marriage certificate was subsequently dated 1940. Mixed ethnicity marriages were uncommon at the time, as were interfaith marriages; Salaman's family in Rhondda, and her husband's family in Yemen, both initially rejected the marriage, with Salaman's family describing Ali as a "heathen", though both families later warmed to the other. The Salamans moved to Butetown, then known as Tiger Bay, where they had ten children and fostered and adopted 14 more.

=== Cairo Café and community activism ===
In the 1940s, the Salamans purchased the Cairo Café on Cairo Street, which became a hub for community life in Tiger Bay. The area had an established Yemeni population dating back to the 1860s, making it the oldest Muslim diaspora group in the United Kingdom; by the 1940s, the area had a diverse population, including Welsh, Yemeni, southern European and Caribbean communities. Salaman was recognised for synthesising her Welsh and Muslim identities; she spoke Welsh and learned Arabic, cooked Welsh and Arab cuisine, and celebrated both Welsh and Yemeni cultural traditions. During World War II and the Cardiff Blitz, she and her husband established a mosque at the back of the café after the only mosque in Cardiff was destroyed, and started providing religious services as well as Arabic and Islamic lessons; a boarding house was also established to support sailors stuck in the area. They also made and sold halva across the country. The café was visited by notable figures including Gamal Abdel Nasser, the President of Egypt.

In 1943, Salaman was featured in photographs taken by the Ministry of Information aimed at documenting the "everyday life" of Muslims living in Tiger Bay. This normalisation of the Muslim community in the United Kingdom marked a difference in the often derogatory way Muslims were documented in the 1920s and 1930s, and the photos were considered as propaganda to rouse the support of the United Kingdom's colonial citizens during World War II.

By the 1960s, the Cairo Café had become a community hub for residents of Tiger Bay, with Salaman being described as the "mother of Cardiff Yemenis" and the "anchor" of the community, alongside her husband. Ali Salaman died in 1965; Salaman continued to run the Cairo Café until 1968, when the area was cleared for planned regeneration works which saw most buildings in the area, including the café, demolished. That same year, she was featured in the BBC documentary Tamed and Shabby Tiger. Salaman continued to be a community figure, and attempted to prevent fractures in the Yemeni community there caused by the Yemenite Wars in the 1970s when Yemen was divided into North and South.

== Death and legacy ==
Salaman died on 27 December 2007.

Recorded interviews with Salaman in 2004 and 2006 have been stored permanently at the National Archives of Wales in Aberystwyth. Salaman was one of the women whose lives were featured in the 2024 book Muslim Women in Britain 1850–1950 by Sariya Cheruvallil-Contractor and Jamie Gilham.

Salaman's son Daoud served as the Chairman of the Wales Islamic Centre at the Cardiff Masjid.
