= 1919 South Wales race riots =

June 1919 violence outbreaks in Wales

South Wales race riots
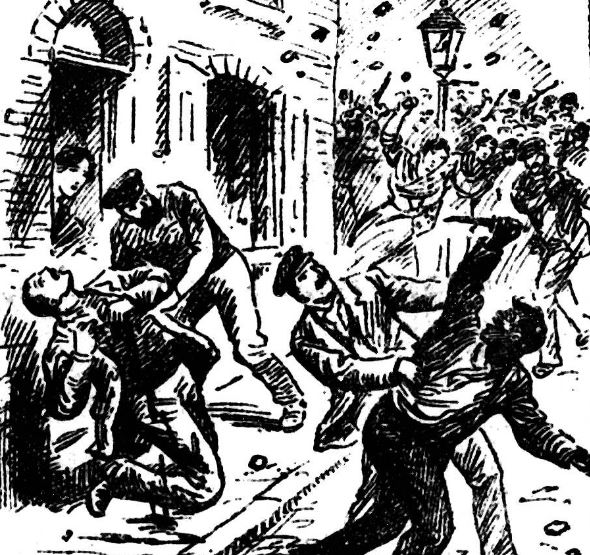
- Illustration of the Cardiff riots from the Illustrated Police News, 19 June 1919
- Location: South Wales
- Date: June 6-14 1919
- Target: Black people, Arabs, Chinese people, Mixed-race people, Greeks, Malays
- Attack type: Arson, murder, racism
- Deaths: 4 killed
- Injuries: Hundreds injured
- No. of participants: 1,500-5,000 people

The 1919 South Wales race riots took place in the docks area of Newport and Barry, South Wales, as well as the Butetown district of Cardiff in June 1919. Four men were killed during the disturbances. Similar riots took place in other parts of Britain that year, including Glasgow and Liverpool.

== Background ==
In the heydays of the late 1800s, South Wales docklands attracted seamen from all over the world. By 1911 in Cardiff Docks, 700 dockers were black or Asian, a proportion second only to London. Wages in the docks could be undercut by employing foreign seamen at a lower rate. The Cardiff Seamen's Strike in June 1911 had become focused on Chinese seafarers, with violence breaking out one afternoon resulting in all of Cardiff's Chinese laundries being smashed up.

The numbers of non-white settlers was augmented when soldiers and sailors were discharged from service in World War I, increasing the numbers of African, Arab and Asian residents even further. Trade on the docks picked up slowly, but not quickly enough to absorb everyone who had been demobbed from the war. Preference in employment was given to white men, though there were still many without work. There was also a housing shortage, compounded by resentment against non-whites who had bought houses and filled them with lodgers. There was also an antipathy towards non-whites who had married local white women (non-whites were almost entirely men at the time).

Tensions erupted into riots in Glasgow, Scotland in January 1919, followed by port towns and cities in England, such as London, South Shields, Hull, and Liverpool in the first half of the year.

== Riots ==
Towns and cities where rioting occurred

=== Newport ===
On 6 June 1919, rioting broke out in Newport. A white soldier attacked a black man due to an alleged remark made to a white woman. This escalated, with a mob of white men attacking non-whites or anything thought to be owned by non-whites. Houses and a restaurant owned by black people, Chinese laundries and a Greek-owned lodging house were attacked in Pillgwenlly and the town centre. Eight houses in the docks area were wrecked, with furniture from two of them being burnt in the street.

=== Cardiff ===
Clashes took place on 11 June 1919 between white soldiers returning from the Great War and local Tiger Bay seamen from Yemen, Somalia, Jamaica. Riots continued for three days, spreading out into Grangetown and parts of the city centre. Ethnic minority families armed themselves and hid in their houses, some of which were attacked and looted. The main road in Butetown, Bute Street, ended up covered with broken glass and the windows boarded up. By Saturday 14 June, things had quietened down, despite huge crowds being on the streets the day before, and the occupants of a Malay-owned shop having to escape attack by climbing on to their roof.

=== Barry ===
Threatening crowds gathered in Barry on the evening of 11 June 1919, following a fatal stabbing in Beverley Street, Cadoxton. Dock labourer, Frederick Longman, had been stabbed by Charles Emmanuel, who originated from the French West Indies. (it later transpired that Emmanuel had been told by Longman to "go down your own street" and had been attacked with a poker before drawing his knife). A black shipwright who lived in the same street tried to escape when the mob broke into his lodging house. The crowd caught up with him and pelted him with stones. The crowds didn't disperse until after midnight, but little damage was reported. On 12 June the Fish & Chip shop owned by Mr Gillespie, a black man who'd lived in Barry for 20 years and married a local white woman, was smashed up by a mob.

Police were reported to have formed barricades on Thompson Street to prevent the attacking mobs reaching Barry Docks. On 13 June, 300 soldiers arrived at Cadoxton and set up camp at Buttrills Fields.

== Deaths ==
Former soldier, Frederick Henry Longman, died after being stabbed in Barry. Three men died during the events in Cardiff: Mohammed Abdullah, a ship's fireman aged 21, died in hospital from a fractured skull, after being attacked in Butetown; John Donovan, aged 33, died after being shot at a city centre house in Millicent Street; Harold Smart aged 20 died after his throat was slit, though it was unclear whether this was directly related to the riots.

== Immediate aftermath ==
As well as the deaths of four men, hundreds of people were injured and dozens were arrested. The damage in Cardiff cost the city council £3000 to repair (equivalent to £133,929 in 2025).

The vast majority of people arrested were from the ethnic minority population. In Newport of the 30 people arrested, 27 were black. A total of 18 white people and ten non-white men appeared in court in Cardiff, with the non-white victims being initially dealt with far more harshly than their white counterparts. Nine black men from Cardiff were charged with the murder of John Donovan and brought to trial in Swansea but, with the prosecution offering no evidence and reducing the charge to 'shooting with intent to murder', the jury did not even need to retire and discuss the case before finding all the men not guilty. Charles Emmanuel, who had killed Frederick Longman in Barry, was sent to prison for five years for manslaughter, having been found not guilty of wilful murder.

== Legacy ==
Though the riots were clearly remembered by the ethnic minority populations in South Wales, they were largely forgotten elsewhere. So much so, that when the Select Committee on Race and Immigration visited Cardiff in 1972, the police reported they had "no record of any serious disturbance involving the indigenous and immigrant population". Historians did not begin to record the history until the 1980s. As of 2020, there were still no memorials or plaques in Cardiff, Newport or Barry remembering the riots.

ITV Cymru broadcast a retelling of the events, in the 2018 television series, 'Dock of the Bay". There was a revival of interest the riots at the 100th anniversary of the events in 2019. A group of Cardiff University students re-imagined the reporting of the riots, using 21st-century social media, on Twitter. In Barry, three centenary commemoration event days took place in September.

A nine month Heritage Lottery Project was launched at Cardiff's Pierhead Building in July 2019 to examine the 1919 race riots.

In May 2021 the Welsh language TV channel, S4C, broadcast a programme about the Cardiff riots. Called Terfysg yn y Bae (Riot in the Bay) it was presented by journalist and newsreader Sean Fletcher.
