= Patti Flynn =

Welsh singer and performer (1937–2020)

- Born: Patricia Maude Young; April 1937; Tiger Bay, Cardiff, Wales
- Died: 10 September 2020 (aged 83)
- Other name: Patti or Patricia Hallgren
- Occupations: Jazz singer; social activist
- Awards: EMWWAA's Lifetime Achievement Award

Patti Flynn (born Patricia Maude Young; April 1937 – 10 September 2020) was a Welsh jazz singer, author, model and social activist. She was a founder and patron of Black History Wales. In 2019 she was honoured with the Ethnic Minority Welsh Women Achievement Association's (EMWWAA) Lifetime Achievement Award.

== Early life ==
Patti Flynn was born Patricia Maude Young, April 1937 in Sophia Street, Cardiff. She was the youngest child of six to Wilmott George Young and Beatrice Young (née Silver). Her father was merchant seaman from Jamaica arrived in Cardiff at the end of the First World War. Her mother was from Cardiff. Her father came to Cardiff during the 1920s and during the Second World War her father lost his life when his ship, the Ocean Vanguard, was torpedoed off the coast of Trinidad in 1942.

When Flynn was one year old, the family moved to 40 Pomeroy Street and she later attended St. Mary's School in Clarence Road, Cardiff. The family also lived in North Church Street, which is close to the Church of St Mary the Virgin and St Stephen the Martyr in Butetown.

== Career ==
Flynn gave her first professional in the Glamorgan pub in Tiger Bay, aged 18, and with accompaniment by her mentor: jazz guitarist Victor Parker. She went on to have a career as a jazz singer, and was a contemporary of Shirley Bassey, who was also born in the area of Tiger Bay. She was also an author, radio actress and was co-founder of the Butetown Bay Jazz Festival.

Flynn developed her skills in UK theatres and clubs throughout the 1960s and 1980s, turning into a seasoned worldwide cabaret performer. One of the highlights of Patti’s career was appearing in the hit West End Show Bubbling Brown Sugar (as understudy to Elaine Delmar).

Flynn moved to Spain in the middle of the 1980s, where she developed into a well-known music producer and radio hostess with her shows "Just for You" and "Costa Nights." Nevertheless, Patti never forgot her roots in Tiger Bay, and she later returned to Cardiff to create and perform her well-known programs, "Jazz Ladies of the Twentieth Century" and "Trip Down Memory Lane," which featured music by the Great American Composers, as well as the "Butetown Bay Divas" with Humie and Jacky Webbe.

Flynn researched black history and culture. Her first book ‘Fractured Horizon’ was published and launched by Butetown History and Arts Centre in 2003.

== Later life and death ==
The monument for the contributions made by the Black, Asian and minority ethnic service men and women during World Wars I and II, and beyond
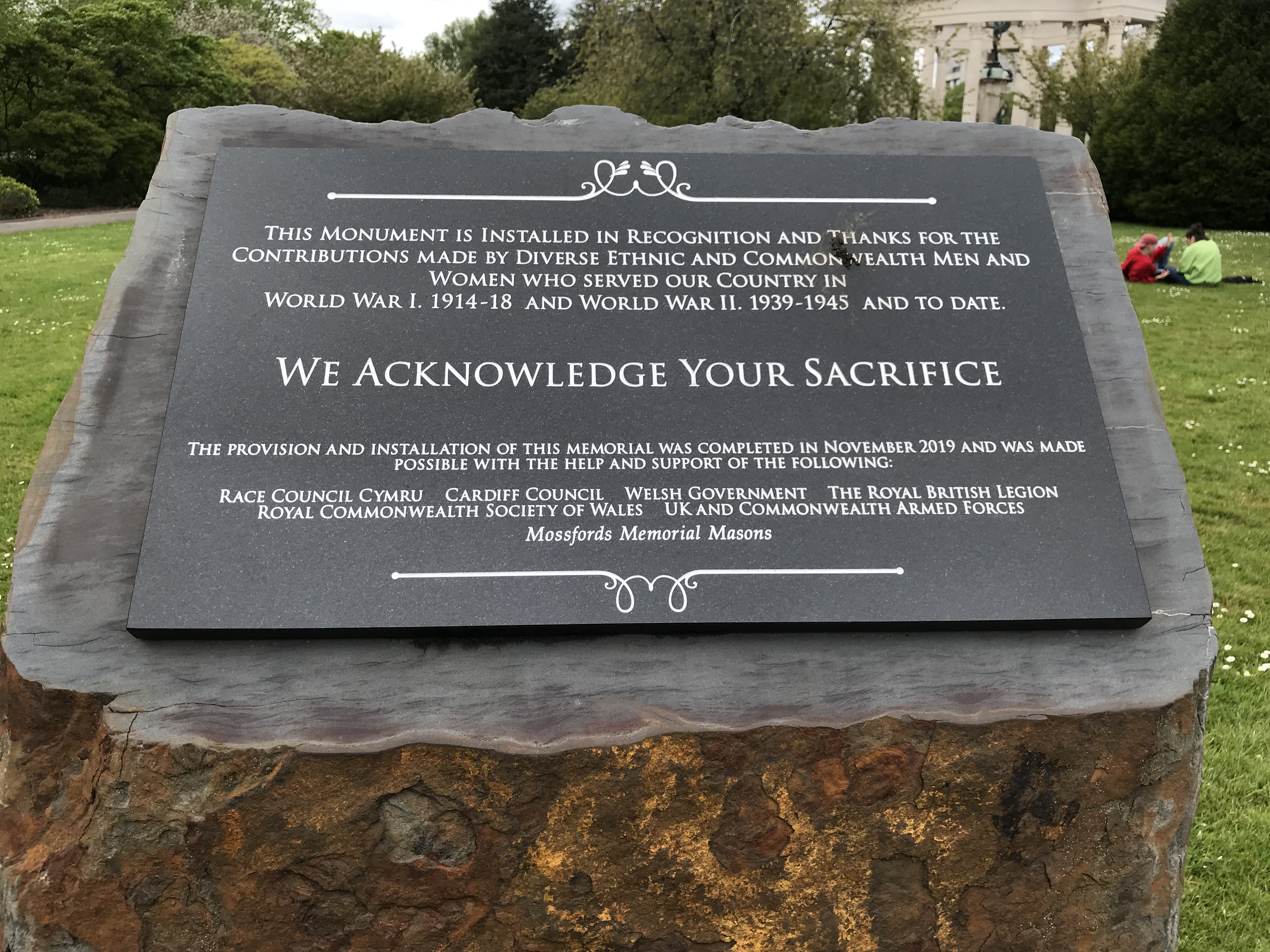
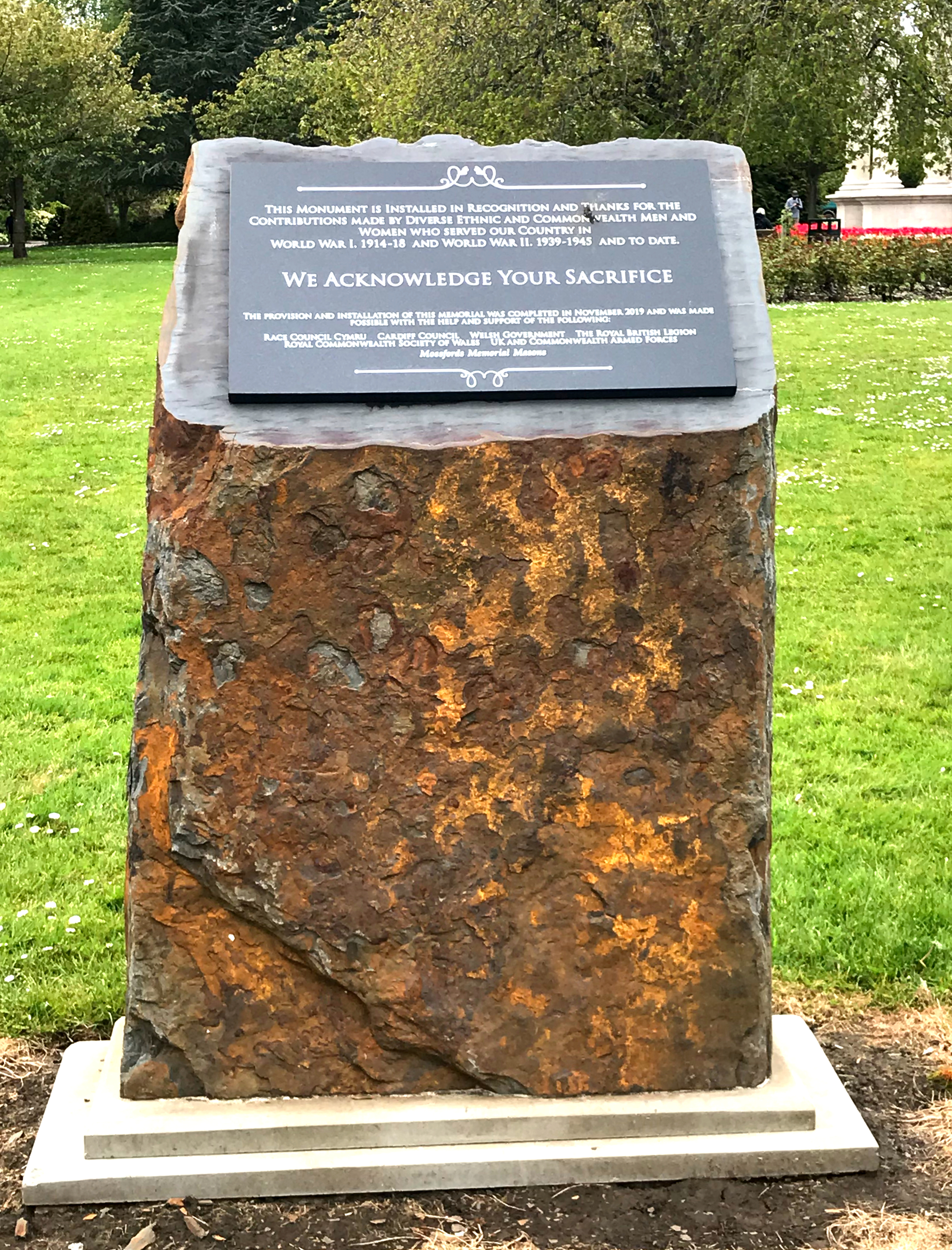

In later life Flynn lived in the Cardiff suburb of Fairwater.

She campaigned valiantly for 26 years to have a monument erected and together in 2019, Patti Flynn, Uzo Iwobi and Race Council Cymru worked with Deputy Minister and Chief Whip Jane Hutt MS, Cllr Susan Elsmore, Cardiff Council, Royal Commonwealth Society Wales, British Legion and British Armed Forces represented by Colonel Jonah MacGill and the stone masons organised to have the monument installed. Patti Flynn wrote the words on the face of the monument and in so doing ensured that her legacy and the selfless sacrifice of Black, Asian and Minority Ethnic service men and women in Wales will never be extinguished". - Black History Wales

In 2019, Flynn was honoured with the Ethnic Minority Welsh Women Achievement Association's (EMWWAA) Lifetime Achievement Award, at the same time as her friend Humie Webbe who also won awards. She was also a founder and patron of Black History Wales.

Patti Flynn died of cancer on 10 September 2020, aged 83 years.

== Bibliography ==
- Fractured Horizon: A Landscape of Memory/Gorwel Briwedig: Tirlun Atgof 2003 ISBN 978-1898317111

== Discography ==
=== Album ===
Year	Title	Details
1979	With Love To You	SRT Productions Ltd; Catalogue No SPTY/79/CUS 563

=== Singles ===
Year	Title	B Side	Details
1982	"Xmas Every Day"	"Please Tell Me"	Prairie Records; Catalogue No PR 009
1982	"Soul Stuntmania"	"Stuntman"	Movie Music; Catalogue No MM 003
