= 1919 British race riots =

Historical event

A number of race riots occurred in Britain between January and August 1919, with sporadic recurrences in 1920 and 1921. They marked a significant moment when the presence of minority ethnic people living in the country, including long-time residents and war veterans, came to public attention.

In the ports of South Shields, Glasgow, London's East End, Salford, Hull, Liverpool, Cardiff, Barry and Newport there were race riots targeting ethnic minority populations. Over the course of the riots there were five fatalities, four of whom were black men, as well as widespread vandalism of property.

There were multiple causes for the riots. The demobilization of troops after World War I had led to intense post-war job competition. The perception that foreigners were taking away jobs became a trigger for the rioting and attacks on Black, Arab and Chinese ethnic communities, especially in British port cities. Another cause identified by the media at the time was white male indignation at interracial relationships between white women and men of colour post-war.

In the aftermath of the riots, Sir Ralph Williams wrote to The Times to blame interracial relationships for the riots. The Eugenics Education Society also wrote to the Colonial Office to claim that interracial relationships and mixed-race children required scientific evaluation. Later pseudoscientific reports focused on mixed-race children in port cities, especially Liverpool, were published in 1927 and 1930 by Rachel Fleming and Muriel Fletcher respectively.

== Events ==
=== Glasgow (January 1919) ===
In January, violence broke out in Glasgow over a perception that black sailors were "being given the preference in signing on for a ship about to sail", and the belief that they would accept lower wages to do so. Thirty African sailors were chased through the streets of Glasgow by a crowd of hundreds, with the Dundee Evening Telegraph reporting that one black sailor had shot and injured a white seaman, one of three injuries sustained during the riot.

=== South Shields (January–February 1919) ===
Disturbances in South Shields in late January and early February 1919 followed tensions around dockside hiring and confrontations near boarding houses in Holborn; assaults on Arab and other minority seamen were reported and arrests followed. Scholarship situates the Shields events within a wider pattern across British ports, with competition for berths, rumours about wage rates, and anxieties over social mixing recurring as triggers.

=== Hull (May 1919) ===
In Hull, violence in May 1919 centred on the mercantile shipping office and nearby streets, involving fighting between white and Black seamen, followed by court proceedings; historians note close resemblance in causes and locations to disturbances in Glasgow and South Shields.

=== Liverpool (June 1919) ===
During a week of rioting in Liverpool in June, 120 black workers were sacked in Liverpool after whites refused to work with them. That same month, a mob of 200 or 300 white people chased black former sailor Charles Wotten to Liverpool's Queen's Dock and killed him there. The 40 police officers responding to the event were initially overpowered by the crowd, with one being shot in the mouth.

=== Cardiff (June 1919) ===
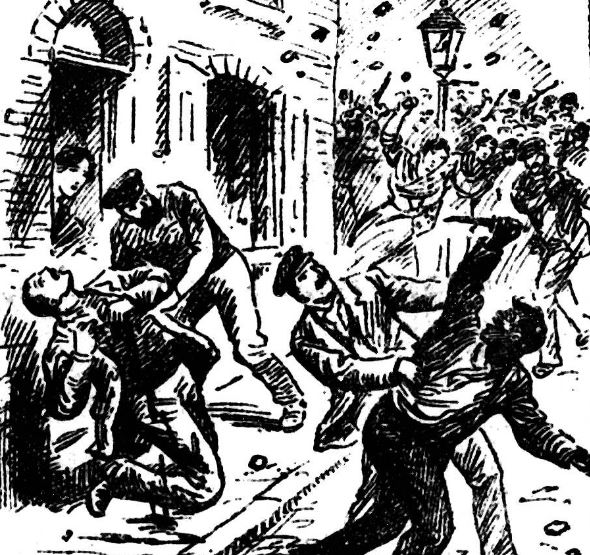
Illustration of the Cardiff riots from the Illustrated Police News, 19 June 1919

A day after Wotten's death in Liverpool, the Sunday Pictorial reported on "fierce racial riots" in Newport, Wales, which spread to Cardiff and Barry over the following week. At least three men died during the Wales riots.

=== London (June 1919) ===
Later the same month, a shop in Cable Street, east London was attacked by a crowd of 3,000 people. The shop, which was "kept by an Arab", had become targeted after stories had been circulating that "some white girls had been seen to enter the house". The occupants were escorted away from the property by police.

=== Salford (1919–1921) ===
Salford experienced clashes linked to dockside employment and housing pressure during 1919, with further incidents through 1920–21; minority lodging houses and businesses were frequent targets and prosecutions followed. Comparative work emphasises that while Salford shared triggers with other ports, crowd dynamics and the sequence of disorder differed locally.

== Analysis ==
A modern study of the 1919 riots by Jacqueline Jenkinson showed that police arrested nearly twice as many blacks (155) as whites (89). While most of the whites were convicted, nearly half of Black arrestees were acquitted. Jenkinson suggests that the courts acknowledged their innocence and were recognising and attempting to correct for police bias.
