= Butetown (electoral ward) =

Butetown ward
- Electoral ward
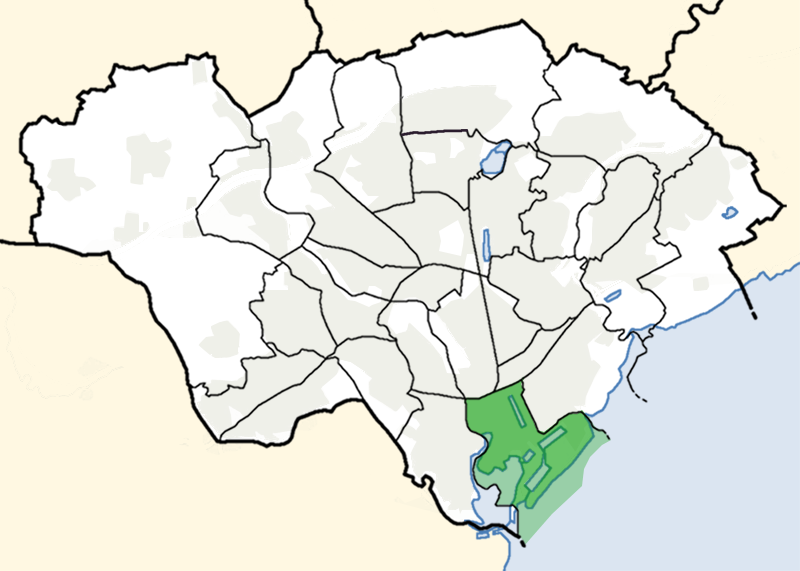
- Location of Butetown ward within Cardiff
- Population: 10,125 (2011 census)
- Principal area: Cardiff
- Country: Wales
- Sovereign state: United Kingdom
- Post town: CARDIFF
- Postcode district: CF10
- Dialling code: +44-29
- UK Parliament: Cardiff South and Penarth
- Senedd Cymru – Welsh Parliament: Cardiff South and Penarth
- Councillors: 1

The Butetown electoral ward of Cardiff covers the Cardiff Bay area of the city, electing a councillor to Cardiff Council.

== Description ==
The Butetown ward includes the areas of Butetown and Atlantic Wharf. It is located in the parliamentary constituency of Cardiff South and Penarth and the Senedd constituency of the same name. Butetown ward is bounded by the wards of Grangetown (and the River Taff) to the west, Cathays and Adamsdown to the north, Splott to the northeast. The ward also covers the island of Flat Holm, which is part of Cardiff though several miles off the coast.

According to the 2011 census the population of the ward was 10,125.

== Representatives ==
Butetown elects one Councillor to Cardiff Council. The ward has been represented by Cllr Saeed Ebrahim (Labour) since May 2017.

Following the Local Democracy and Boundary Commission for Wales' recommendations, the number of Butetown councillors will be increased from 1 to 3, effective from the 2022 Cardiff Council elections.

=== Councillors since 1995 ===
Election	Member	Party
1995	Ben Foday	Labour
1999	Betty Campbell	Independent
2004	Vaughan Gething	Labour
2008	Delme Greening	Liberal Democrat
2012	Ali Ahmed	Labour
2017	Saeed Ebrahim	Labour
2022	Saeed Ebrahim; Helen Gunter; Margaret Lewis.	Labour; Labour; Labour

=== Under-representation ===
When elected in 2012 Councillor Ahmed raised concerns that the Butetown ward, with only one councillor for a diverse area, was under-represented on Cardiff Council. The issue was raised again in 2016 by the Atlantic Wharf Residents’ Association, who demanded that Atlantic Wharf be made into a ward of its own with its approximately 1500 houses and flats. Butetown ward had a population similar to the Cardiff wards of Llanrumney and Cyncoed, which each elected three councillors. Following a 2020 Cardiff boundary review, Butetown was promised an increase from 1 to 3 councillors.

=== Cardiff City Council 1983-1996 ===
Between 1983 and the council's dissolution in 1996, Butetown was the name of the ward to Cardiff City Council (prior to that it had been part of the South ward). The ward's first councillor, Gaynor Legall, was also the first black female local councillor in Wales.

Election	Member	Party
1983	Gaynor Legall	Labour
1987	Gaynor Legall	Labour
1991	Betty Campbell	Independent
