= Butetown History and Arts Centre =

Former archive and centre in Cardiff, Wales

- Logo of the Butetown History and Arts Centre

General information
- Town or city: Cardiff, Wales
- Country: United Kingdom
- Coordinates: 51.46596562443073°N 3.165202086807714°W
- Opened: 1988
- Closed: December 2017

Butetown History & Arts Centre (BHAC) was a historical archive, educational centre and art gallery located in the Butetown area of Cardiff, Wales. BHAC was founded by Glenn Jordan as a non-profiting organisation with the aim to involve the local people of Butetown to help promote the area's history of the docklands.

== Background ==
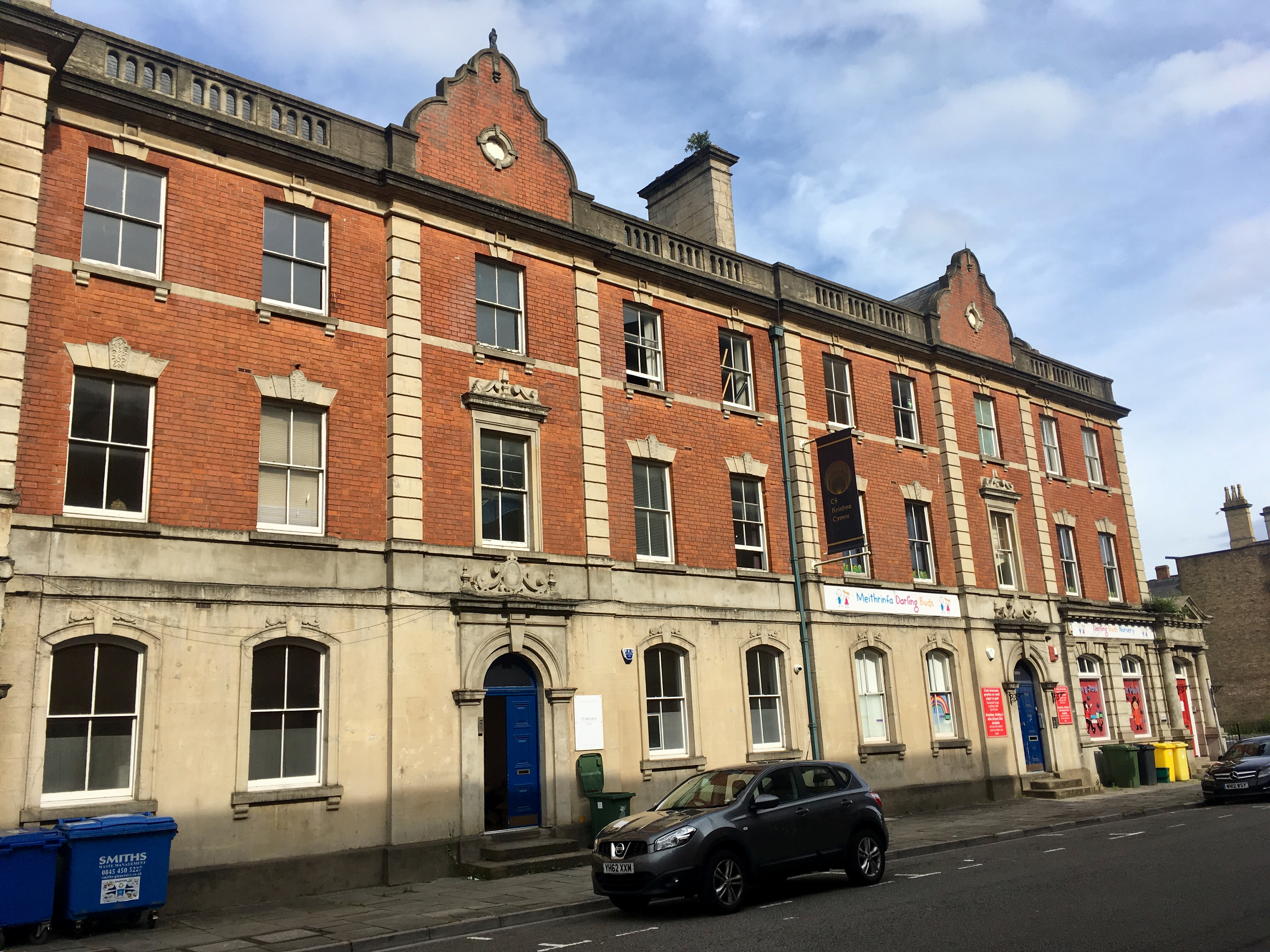
4 Dock Chambers (Emlyn House), Bute Street, Cardiff. The former home to the Butetown History and Arts Centre

BHAC was located in the heart of Butetown (previously known as Tiger Bay), one of the UK's oldest multi-racial communities. The community centre started off as a place for weekly oral history classes and was the initiative of African-American academic, Glenn Jordan, who arrived in Cardiff during the 1980s and decided to stay, hoping to allow the Tiger Bay residents a chance to track the 150-year history of Cardiff Bay. Jordan and BHAC have aimed to create an archive of local people's memories, documents and photographs. The Centre emerged in 1988 with the help of a small handful of local residents, meeting at the Butetown Community Centre where they learnt interview techniques and recording methods. By 2000 the centre had recorded several hundred hours of oral history, published several books and was running cultural-political and educational activities for local adults. By 2005 the centre had collected 450 hours of oral history and 3,000 photographs. BHAC's collection also includes paintings, photographs and sculptures by local artists. It occupied a 2,500 square feet (230 m^{2}) building in the centre of Butetown, which it moved into in 1996 with the help of European funding.

The centre was featured in a 2001 report, "Creative Regeneration: Lessons from 10 Community Arts Projects", by the Joseph Rowntree Foundation.

Visual and performing arts was an important part of BHAC's work. The centre now runs the Diversity Arts Wales (DAW) programme – an initiative, funded by the Arts Council of Wales, that supports the professional development of artists from ethnic minority backgrounds. DAW also encourages artists, whatever their background, to engage in multicultural and intercultural work.

BHAC was funded by the Home Office, Welsh Assembly, Arts Council for Wales, Cardiff Council and various foundations. However the BHAC now relies largely on volunteer staff and income from the museum shop.

== Archive ==
One of the main areas within the BHAC is the archive which is the result of over 25 years of collecting history connected to the multicultural area of Cardiff Bay. By 2005 BHAC had collected 3000 photographs and 500 hours of oral history. The centre's collection also includes paintings, videos, official documentation and sculptures by local artists. The priority of the BHAC was to make the archive fully accessible online and to add to the collection, to expand their multimedia displays and educational materials to allow for more exhibitions.

== Visual and performing arts ==
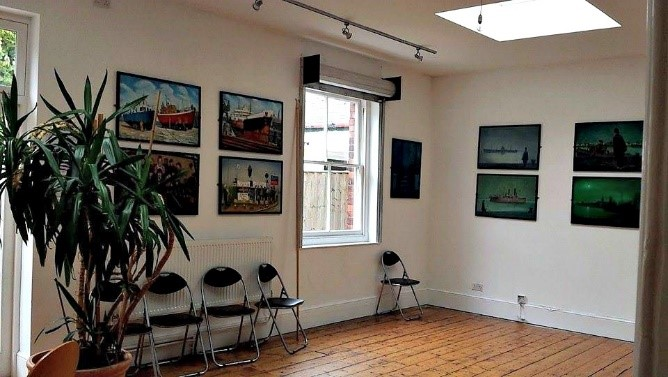
One of the Exhibition Rooms at the BHAC, currently being used as an Art Gallery

Since 2003, BHAC held nineteen exhibitions, which focused on bringing awareness of Wales as a culturally and ethnically diverse nation. Some of the pieces were featured on BBC’s ‘Your Paintings’.

== Publishing ==
Within the Butetown History and Arts Centre, there have been a number of books published over the years. All of the books held in the BHAC are based around Cardiff Bay and they all, in one way or another, focus upon the Bay's history such as; 'Butetown & Cardiff Docks' compiled by Brian Lee and Butetown History & Arts Centre.

== Closure ==
In May 2016 the centre's committee announced they had no alternative but to close BHAC, because of a lack of new funding. They were looking for a storage facility to preserve their archive. The centre is reported as closed in December 2017.

Much of their archive material has been transferred to The Heritage & Cultural Exchange.
