= Cardiff Docks =

Port in Wales

Port of Cardiff
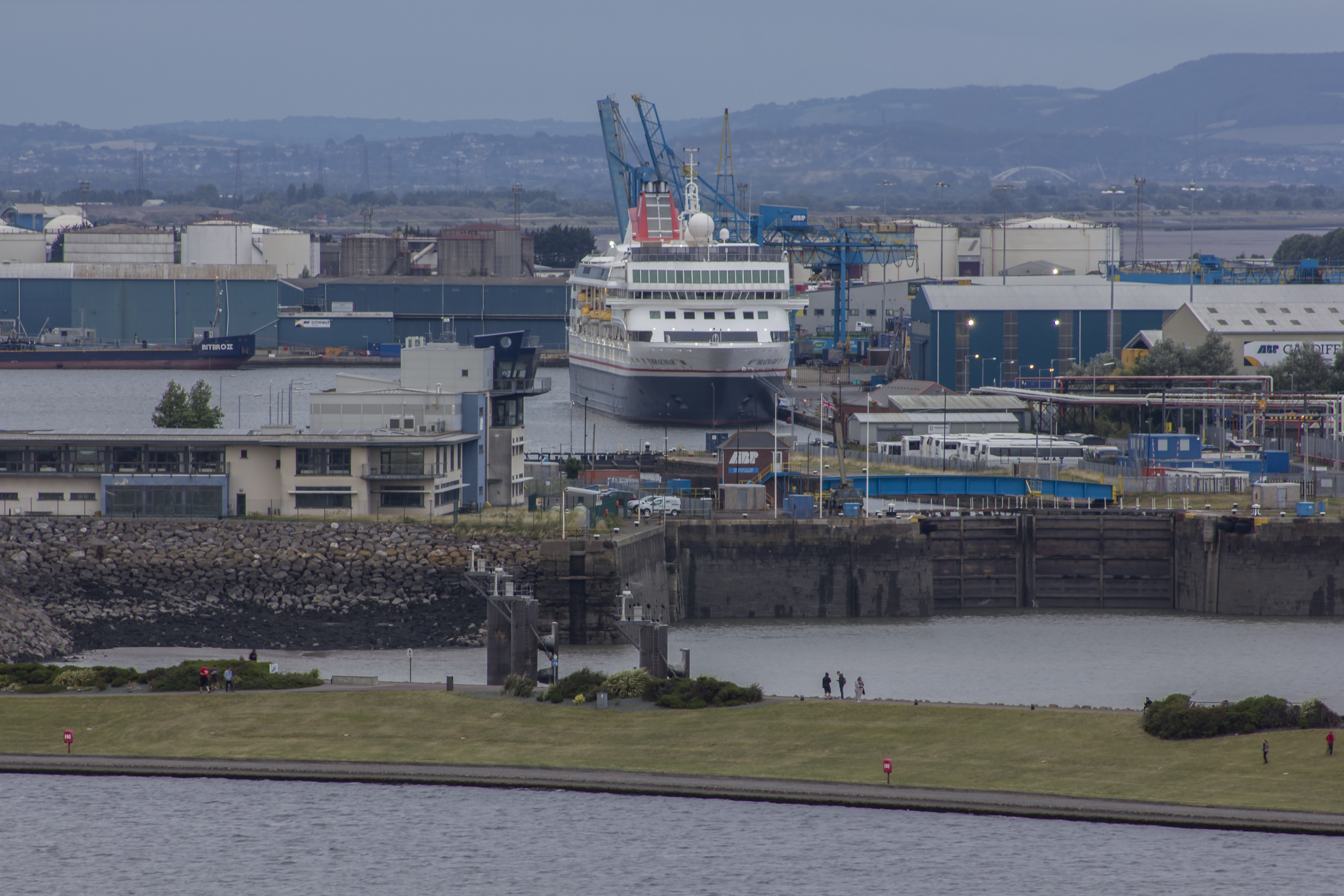
- Queen Alexandra Dock
- Click on the map for a fullscreen view

Location
- Country: UK
- Location: Cardiff, Wales
- Coordinates: 51.46533°N 3.15382°W

Details
- Opened: 1839
- Owned by: Associated British Ports
- Type of harbour: Artificial
- Size: 852 acres (345 ha)
- No. of berths: 25

Statistics
- Annual cargo tonnage: 2.5 million tonnes
- Website southwalesports.co.uk

Cardiff Docks (Welsh: Dociau Caerdydd) is a port in southern Cardiff, Wales. At its peak, the port was one of the largest dock systems in the world with a total quayage of almost 7 mi (11 km). Once the main port for the export of South Wales coal, the Port of Cardiff remains active in the import and export of containers, steel, forest products and dry and liquid bulks.

== History ==
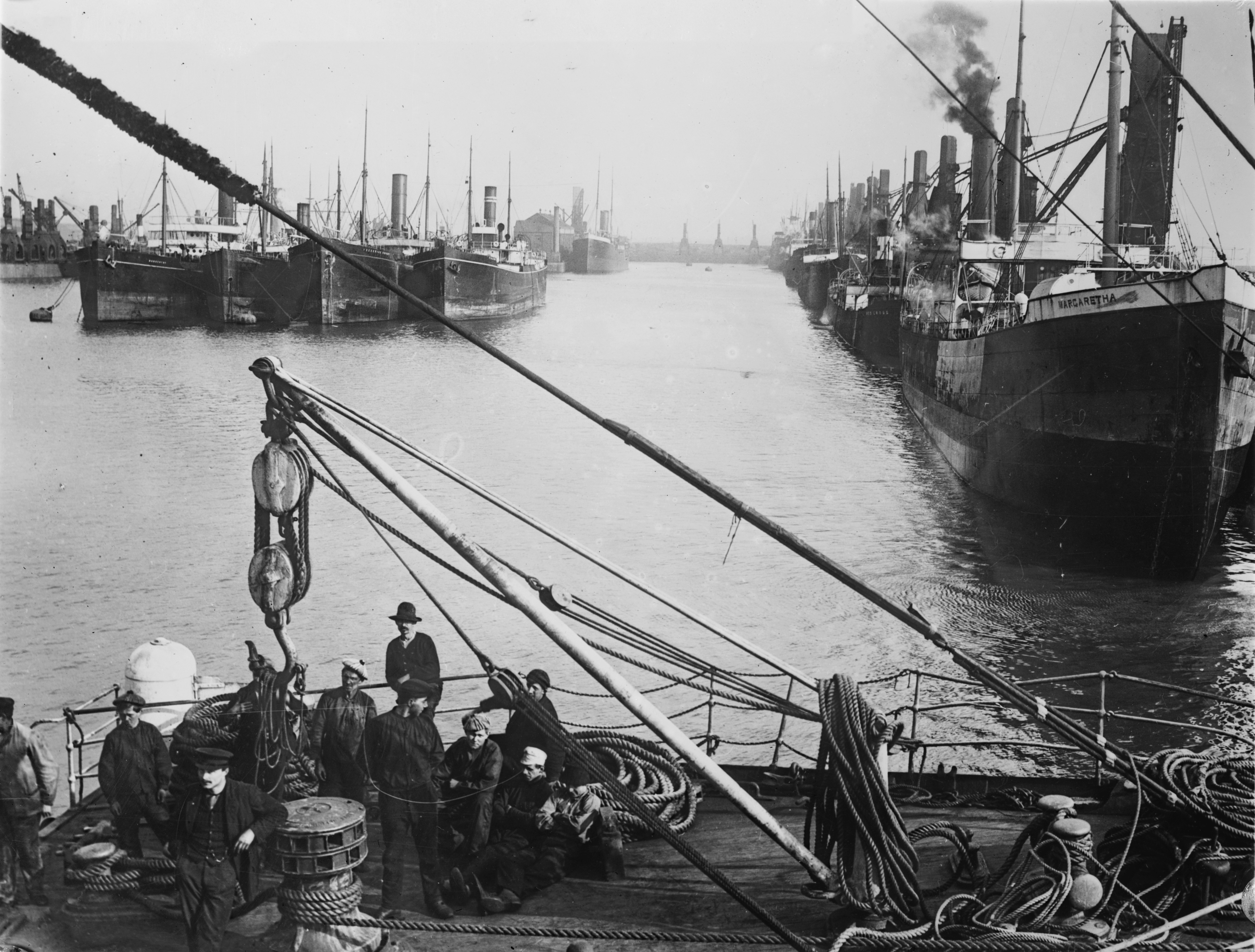
Coal ships tied up at Cardiff Docks

Following the development of the coal found in the Cynon Valley, Rhondda Valley, and Merthyr areas of South Wales, the export of both coal and iron products required a sea connection to the Bristol Channel if economic volumes of product were to be extracted.

In 1794, the Glamorganshire Canal was completed, linking the then small town of Cardiff with Merthyr, and in 1798 a basin was built, connecting the canal to the sea. By the 1830s, Cardiff became the pre-eminent iron-exporting port, shipping almost half of British overseas iron exports; between 1840 and 1870, the volume of coal exports increased from 44,350 to 2.219 million tonnes.

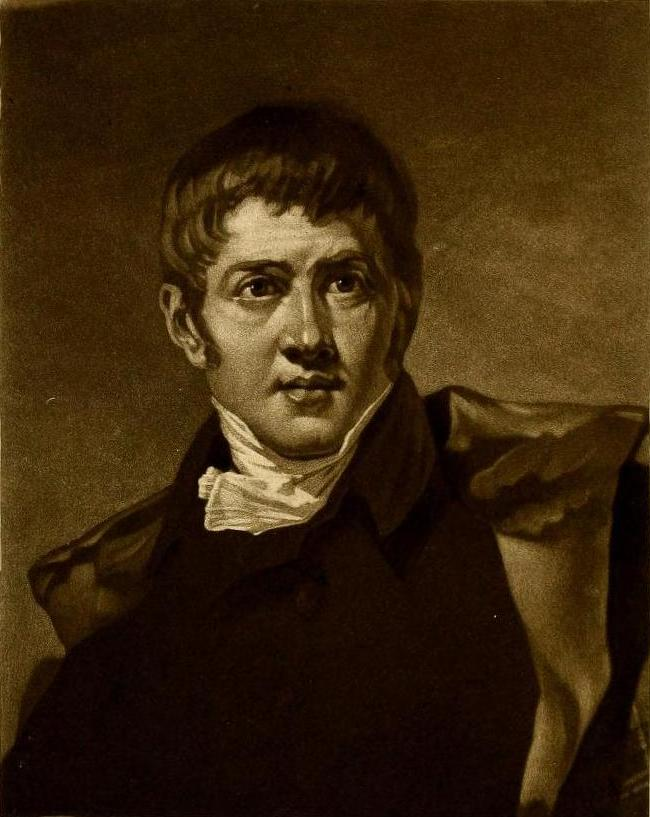
2nd Marquess of Bute

=== Bute Docks ===
Increasing agitation for proper dock facilities led Cardiff's foremost landowner, John Crichton-Stuart, 2nd Marquess of Bute, to promote the construction of the (West) Bute Dock. The dock design was by Admiral William Henry Smyth and the resident engineer was George Turnbull. Two years after the October 1839 dock opening, the Taff Vale Railway was opened, following much the same route as the canal.

With the construction of the new East Bute Dock from 1855, designed by James Walker of Messrs. Walker & Burges and built by Thomas Cubitt's firm, its opening in 1859 resulted in coal supplanting iron as the industrial foundation of South Wales, with exports reaching 2 million tons as early as 1862.

The Bute Docks Feeder supplied the East Bute Dock with water extracted from the River Taff at Blackweir in Maindy, and now supplies the Roath Dock. It is largely an open canal through central Cardiff, other than a culvert between the New Theatre and the Cardiff International Arena.

=== Queen Alexandra Dock ===
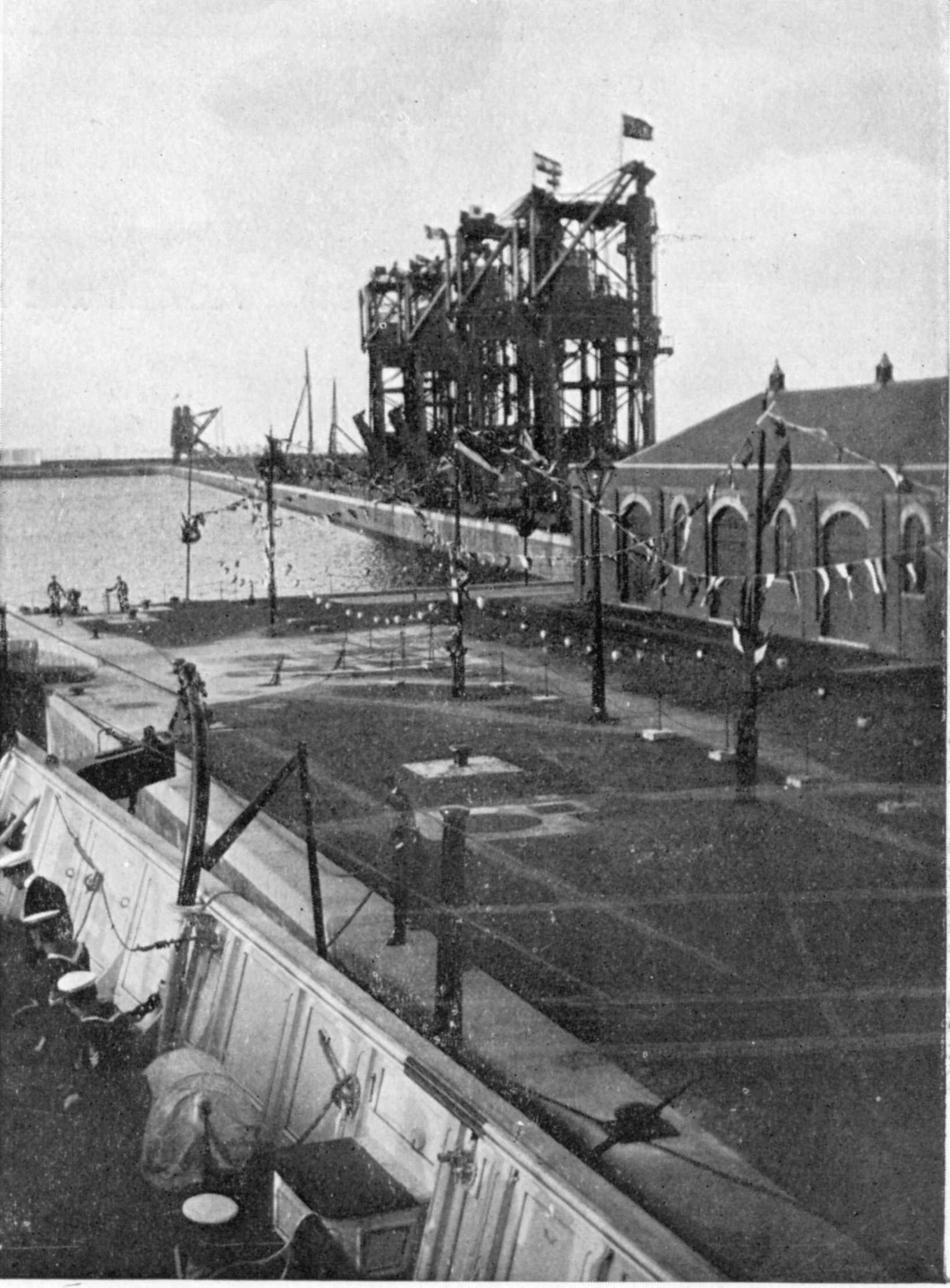
Opening of the Queen Alexandra Dock in 1907. Picture taken by Queen Alexandra

Frustration at the lack of development at Cardiff led to rival docks being opened at Penarth in 1865 and Barry, Wales in 1889.

These developments eventually spurred Cardiff into action, with the opening of the Roath Dock in 1887, and the Queen Alexandra Dock in 1907. By then, coal exports from the South Wales Coalfield via Cardiff totalled nearly 9 million tons per annum, much of it exported in the holds of locally owned tramp steamers. By 1913, this had risen to 10,700,000 tons, making Cardiff second only to Barry, Wales as the largest coal exporting dock in the world.

=== Shipping ===
Cardiff's first steamship was the Llandaff of 1865, and by 1910, there were some 250 tramp steamers owned at Cardiff, by prominent firms such as William Cory & Son, Morel, Evan Thomas Radcliffe, Tatem and Reardon-Smith. Each day, the principals of these companies would meet to arrange cargoes of coal for their ships in the opulent Coal Exchange in Mount Stuart Square. This trade reached its pinnacle in 1913, when 10.7 million tons of coal were exported from the port. After the First World War, there was a boom in shipping in Cardiff, with 122 shipping companies in existence in 1920. The boom proved short-lived, however; oil was growing in importance as a maritime fuel, and the terms of the Treaty of Versailles soon flooded Europe with cheap German reparation coal.

=== Railways ===
The Taff Vale Railway was built to transport coal from the South Wales Valleys to the docks. Its headquarters were a currently derelict building in Cardiff Bay railway station. The building was turned into a railway heritage centre in 1979 by the Butetown Historic Railway Society. By 1994 the Society had started to run steam locomotive hauled passenger services up and down 550 yards of track. However, as the Cardiff Bay Development Corporation had no interest in the railway, the society changed its name to the Vale of Glamorgan Railway and moved from the site in 1997 to Barry Island railway station.

=== Decline ===
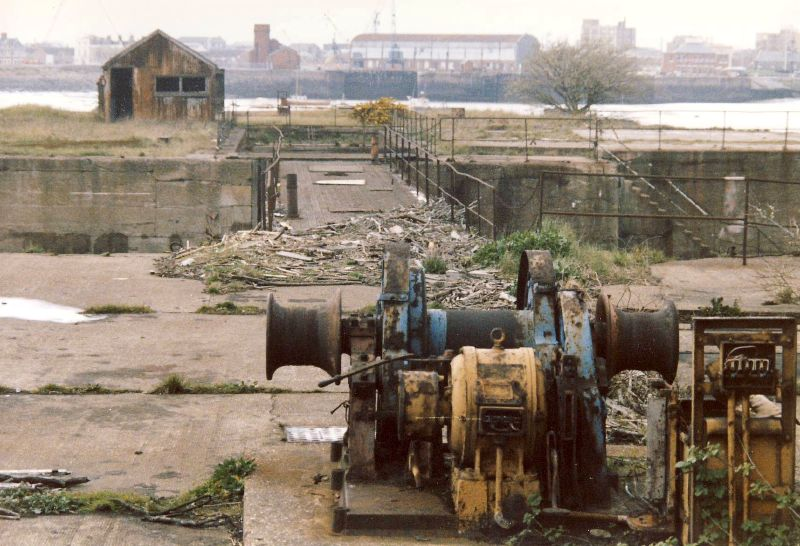
Decline of Cardiff Docks (1990)

From 1910 onwards capacity issues meant that the more modern and less tidal Barry Docks took over as the largest volume export point of coal. Until the early 1920s, Cardiff docks continued to boom as a location for shipping companies, but the fall in demand for Welsh coal caused a dramatic fall in exports. By 1932, in the depths of the Great Depression which followed the General Strike in 1926, coal exports had fallen to below 5 million tonnes and dozens of locally owned ships were laid-up. Despite intense activity at the port during the Second World War (which led to the attentions of the German Luftwaffe during the Cardiff Blitz), coal exports continued to decline, finally ceasing in 1964. In 1950, imports outstripped exports for the first time in the port's history. The 1970s saw a short-term import boom, and in the 1980s the port experienced a slight rise in traffic, while much of the former port area began to be regenerated into non-port uses. The port found a niche as an important local centre for general cargo operations.

== Modern port facilities ==
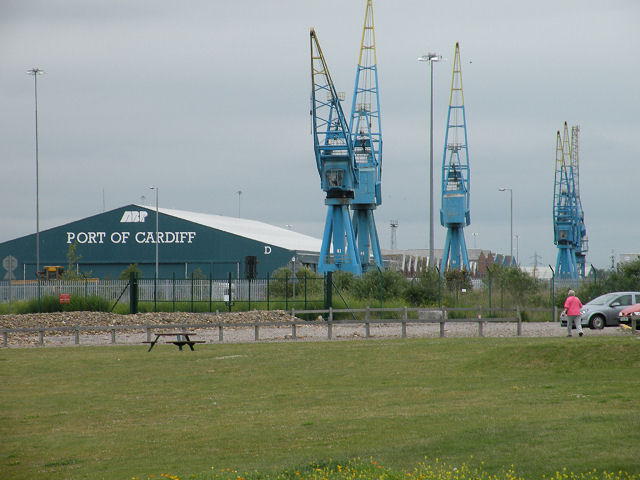
Port of Cardiff today

Cardiff now has three operational docks capable of handling ships of up to 35,000 tons deadweight: Queen Alexandra Dock, Roath Dock and Roath Basin. Although still owned by the port, Roath Basin is now only used as a hospitality berth, and is only accessible by vessels via Roath Dock. The port has transit sheds with nearly 40,000 m^{2} (430,000 sq ft) of indoor storage plus 22.9 ha (57 acres) of open storage. There are 7 quayside cranes plus a range of mobile cranes. Cardiff's specialised facilities include a distribution terminal and chill and cold storage for perishables.

== Tiger Bay ==
Tiger Bay was a local nickname for the general Cardiff Docks area, the evocative phrase deriving from the area's rough-and-tumble reputation. Merchant seamen arrived in Cardiff from all over the world, only staying for as long as it took to discharge and reload their ships: consequently many murders and lesser crimes went unsolved and unpunished, the perpetrators having sailed for other ports. In Victorian times, the name "Tiger Bay" was used in popular literature and slang (especially that of sailors) to denote any dock or seaside neighbourhood which shared a similar notoriety for danger.

== Cardiff Bay ==
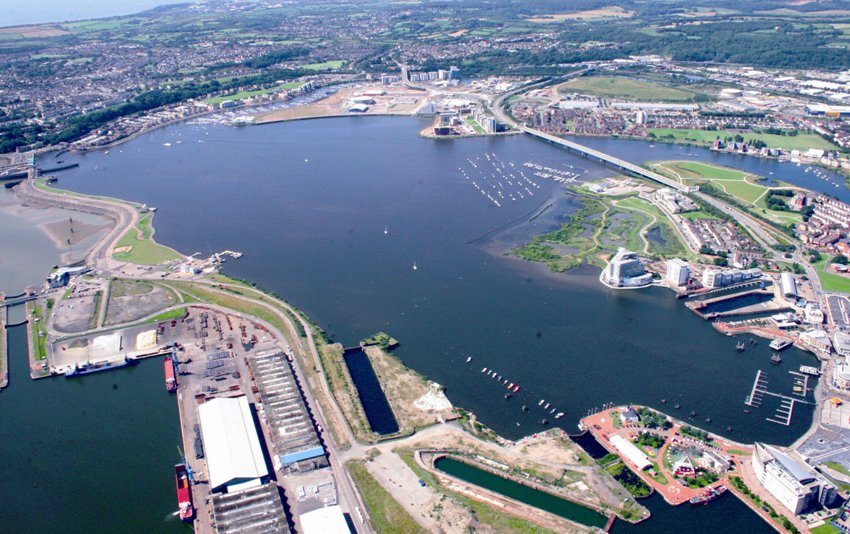
The modern day Cardiff Bay, with the Cardiff Barrage to the left

The Cardiff Bay Development Corporation was created in 1987 to counter the effects of economic depression in this run-down area. Today, the port of Cardiff and what is now known as Cardiff Bay has been totally transformed by the Cardiff Barrage that impounds the Rivers Taff and the Ely to create a massive fresh-water lake across to Penarth Head.

Only two docks, the Roath and the Queen Alexandra, remain in use, and just two shipping companies remain, albeit buoyant with their worldwide interests. Shipping movements varying from a couple of movements to 10 or 12 per tide, with trade in timber, oil, scrap and containers.

== See also ==
- Marquess of Bute
- Butetown
- Tiger Bay
- Cardiff Bay
- History of Cardiff
