= Tiger Bay =

Former area name of Cardiff, Wales

Coordinates: 51.463°N 3.167°W

Tiger Bay
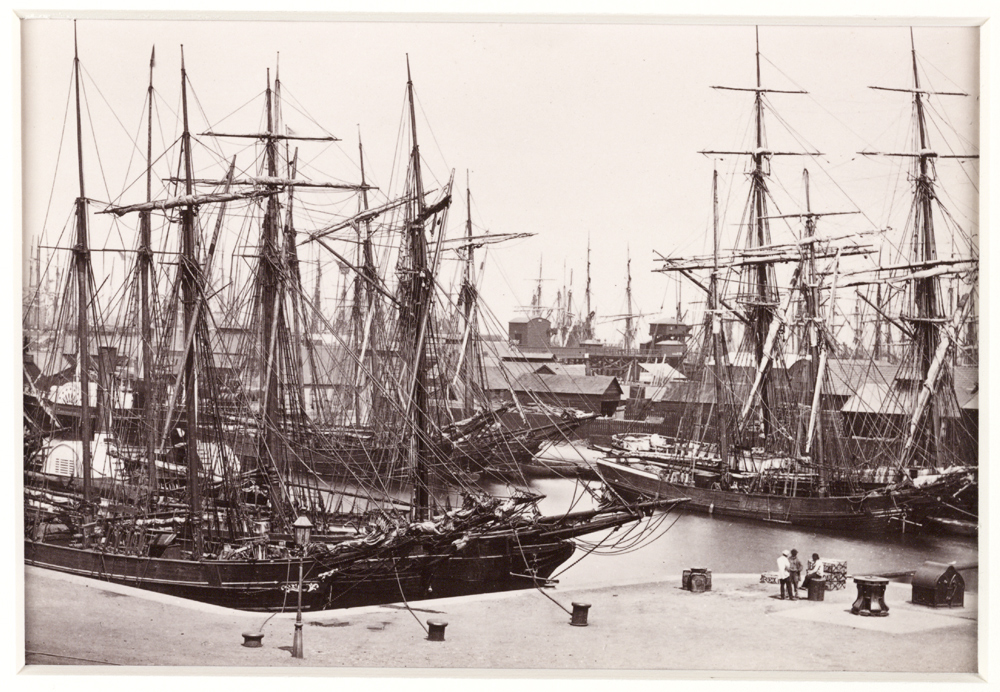
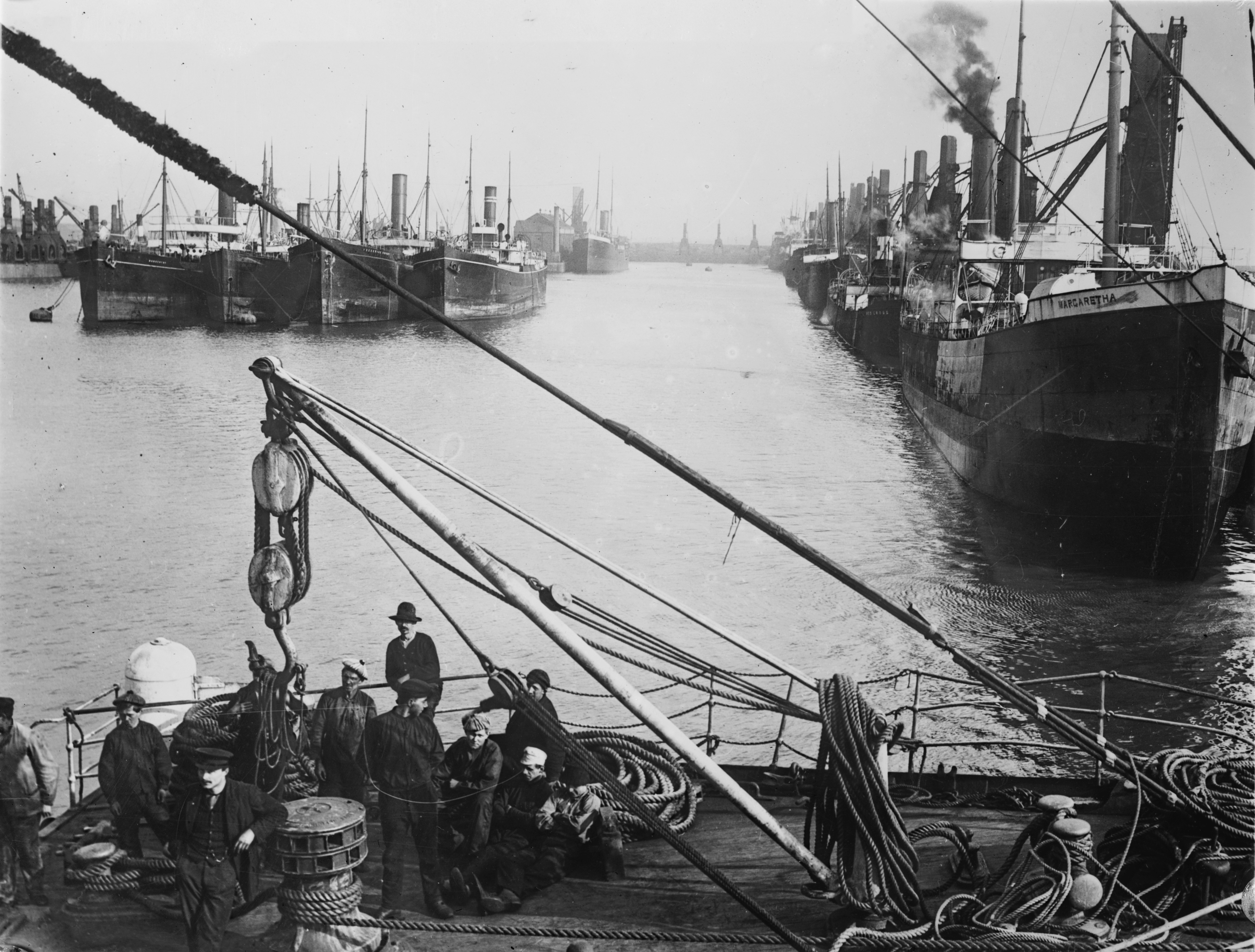
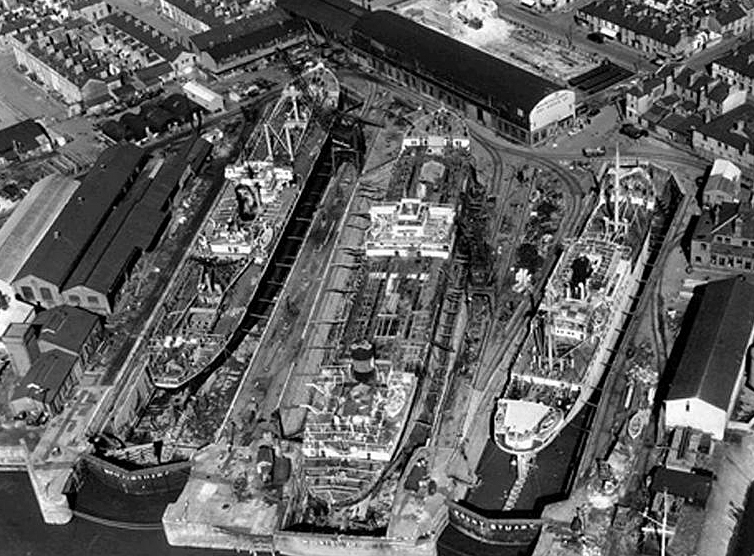
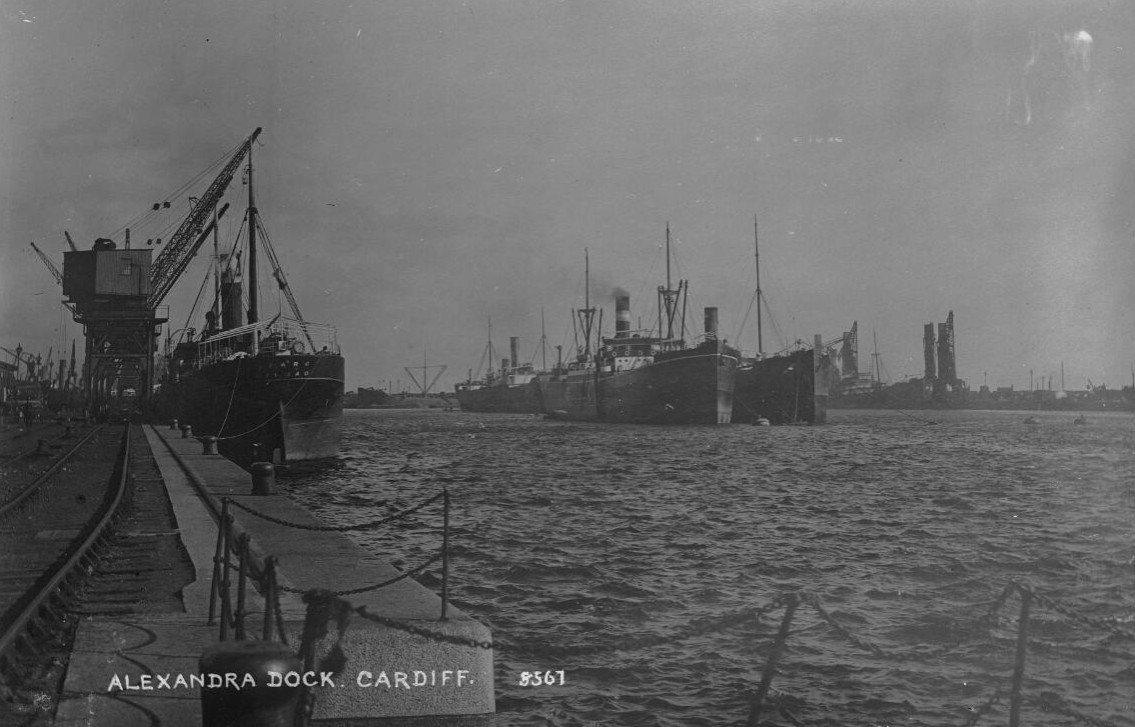

Tiger Bay (Welsh: Bae Teigr) was the local name for an area of Cardiff which covered Butetown and Cardiff Docks. Following the building of the Cardiff Barrage, which dams the tidal rivers, Ely and Taff, to create a body of water, it is referred to as Cardiff Bay. Tiger Bay is Wales’ oldest multi-ethnic community, with sailors and workers from over 50 countries settling there from the mid-19th century onwards.

== Background ==
Cardiff Docks played a major part in Cardiff's development as it was the means of exporting coal from the South Wales Valleys to the rest of the world, helping to power the Industrial Age. The coal mining industry helped fund the growth of Cardiff to become the capital city of Wales, and contributed towards making the docks' owner, the 3rd Marquess of Bute, the richest man in the world at the time.

In 1794, the Glamorganshire Canal was completed, linking Cardiff with Merthyr, and in 1798 a basin was built, connecting the canal to the sea. Increasing agitation for proper dock facilities led Cardiff's foremost landowner, the 2nd Marquess of Bute, to promote the construction of the West Bute Dock, which opened in October 1839. Just two years later, the Taff Vale Railway opened. From the 1850s coal supplanted iron as the industrial foundation of South Wales, as the Cynon Valley and Rhondda Valley were mined.

== Growth of 'Tiger Bay' ==
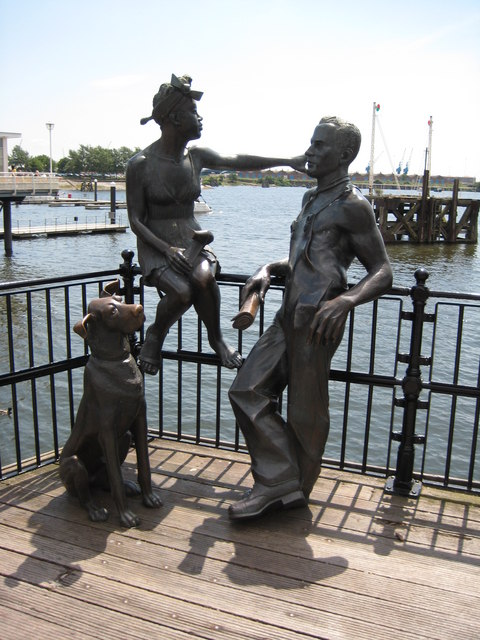
Immigrant Statues, Cardiff Bay. A bronze of an immigrant couple symbolising the arrival of many to Tiger Bay seeking a better life in Britain.

As Cardiff's coal exports grew, so did its population. Well-appointed residential areas were created in the 1840s and early 1850s, centred around Mount Stuart Square and Loudoun Square (between West Bute Street and the Glamorganshire Canal) to house the growing numbers of merchants, brokers, builders, and seafarers from across the world settling close to the docks. The area, known as Tiger Bay from the fierce currents around the local tidal stretches of the River Severn, became one of the UK's oldest multicultural communities, with migrant communities from over 50 nationalities, including Norwegian, Somali, Yemeni, Spanish, Italian, Caribbean, and Irish. All the nationalities helped to create the multicultural character of the area, where people from different backgrounds socialised together and intermarried. Between the 1940s and 1968, the Cairo Café, run by Yemeni sailor Ali Salaman and his Welsh wife Olive, became a centre for Tiger Bay's diverse communities, providing a restaurant, a boarding house, and a mosque.

The East Bute dock opened in 1859. Coal exports from Cardiff Docks reached 2 million tons as early as 1862; by 1913, this had risen to 10,700,000 tons. Frustration at the lack of development at Cardiff led to rival docks being opened at nearby Penarth in 1865 and Barry in 1889. These developments eventually spurred Cardiff into action, with the opening of the Roath Dock in 1887 and the Queen Alexandra Dock in 1907. Coal exports from the South Wales Coalfield via Cardiff totalled nearly 9 million tons per annum, much of it exported in the holds of locally owned tramp steamers. The wealthier residents were able to move away to the new Cardiff suburbs. Butetown (particularly the area around Loudoun Square) became crowded, as families took in lodgers and split up the three-storey houses to help pay the rents.

Tiger Bay had a reputation as a tough and dangerous area; but locals who lived and stayed in the area describe a far friendlier place. Merchant seamen arrived in Cardiff from all over the world, only staying for as long as it took to discharge and reload their ships. Consequently, it has been said that the area became the red-light district of Cardiff, and many murders and lesser crimes went unsolved and unpunished, as the perpetrators had sailed away. In reality the primary brothels streets, and the primary red light area, were Charlotte Street and Whitmore Lane, both of which were outside Tiger Bay. They were demolished, and the site is now the Marriott Hotel car park.

By 1932, in the depths of the Great Depression which followed the 1926 United Kingdom general strike, coal exports had fallen to below 5 million tons, and dozens of locally owned ships were laid up. It was an era of depression from which Cardiff never really recovered, and despite intense activity at the port during the Second World War, coal exports continued to decline, finally ceasing in 1964.

=== Redevelopment ===
Coal exports were key to the local economy, which began to decline in the 1960s, when exports from the docks stopped. Housing clearances in the 1960s relocated many of the residents of Butetown, previously the residential core of the docklands, into unpopular tower blocks. The economic decline in the 1960s and 1970s led to a 25% vacancy rate of buildings and 60% unemployment in Butetown. The infrastructure and buildings in the area declined: by the 1970s and 1980s the area required development and investment.

The price of land in the area decreased as there was a decline in traditional industry. This led to a rise in commercial developments, which were largely celebrated as a regeneration, although they displaced the local multicultural community as homes were demolished.

Around 1999, the area was redeveloped by the Cardiff Bay Development Corporation. This redevelopment was focused around the building of the Cardiff Bay Barrage, one of the most controversial building projects of the day, which impounded the rivers Taff and the Ely to create a massive freshwater lake. This resulted in the equally controversial renaming of the area as "Cardiff Bay".

The opposition to the development was led on the grounds of removal of communities, and ecological preservation of the mud-flats and salt marshes which were home to wintering birds.

Local historian Neil Sinclair was highly critical of the redevelopment scheme, describing it in 2016 as a "tragedy", and accusing it of creating a "lacklustre council estate; an architectural monstrosity".

Butetown councillor Saeed Ebrahim has commented on the present day repercussions of these developments on the local community:

“The way developments were created was not very healthy, put it that way. The developers created us and them. They never wanted to include their developments in the older people and the older Butetown communities.”

“The development of Cardiff Bay has never included the people of Butetown frankly, and still to this day they are not included into the agenda of businesses. And still, there's a huge divide in the Bay and Butetown.”

The funding available for the existing community was small and the Tiger Bay name was pushed out in favour of Cardiff Bay.

== Community and cultural spaces ==
=== Industrial and Maritime Museum ===
In the redevelopment of the area, some long-standing cultural institutions were closed or demolished to make space for new buildings. In the 1970s, the Industrial and Maritime Museum was built on Bute Street to commemorate the heritage and history of the area. The museum, along with other historical buildings on Bute Street, were demolished in the 1990s to make space for the Mermaid Quay shopping and leisure development.

=== Butetown History and Arts Centre ===
In 1988, coinciding with the creation of the Cardiff Bay Development Corporation, the Butetown History and Arts Centre was created by the Butetown community to preserve the cultural-political heritage of the area. The centre was the site of historical oral recordings, educational events and activities for children and adults, and it also published books. The founder, an American historian named Glenn Jordan, was certain that the centre would remain an integral part of the regeneration project, since the area was deemed to be an example of a harmonious multi-racial community. However, the corporation provided no funding to the centre, and the space had to rely on external charitable funding to keep running. In late 2016, the long-standing institution could not obtain funding and was shut down. Its rich collection of the history of the Tiger Bay needed re-housing, and the last important link for communities that had been cleared out from the area, to make space for the re-generation, was now closed.

The BHAC collection has passed to The Heritage & Cultural Exchange, a local community-based organisation.

== Popular culture ==
The name "Tiger Bay" was applied in popular literature and slang (especially that of sailors) to any dock or seaside neighbourhood which shared a similar notoriety for danger.

=== Film ===
- Tiger Bay (1934), is a British film starring Anna May Wong.
- Tiger Bay (1959), is a British film starring John and Hayley Mills, includes many scenes shot in the docks area and at Newport Transporter Bridge.

=== Music ===
- On her album The Performance (2009), Shirley Bassey sings the semi-autobiographical "The Girl From Tiger Bay", written by the Manic Street Preachers and David Arnold.
- The album Tiger Bay (1994), by indie pop band Saint Etienne, is named after the 1959 film of the same name, which was filmed at the Cardiff docks.
- "Tiger Bay" is a song by The Hennessys.
- "Tiger Bay" is a song by Italian singer Mina from her 1979 album Attila.
- "Tyger Bay" is a song by NWOBHM band Tygers of Pan Tang.
- Tiger Bay is mentioned as one of the locations in Ian Dury & the Blockheads' song "Hit Me With Your Rhythm Stick".
- Tiger Bay is mentioned in the Welsh alternative rock band Feeder's song "Lost in the Wilderness" from their 2024 double album "Black/Red".

=== Television ===
- The television drama Tiger Bay (1997) is based in the area.

=== Theatre ===
- A musical about the history of Tiger Bay named Tiger Bay: The Musical premiered at the Wales Millennium Centre (in Cardiff Bay) from 13 to 25 November 2017.
- A play by Diana Nneka Atuona, Trouble in Butetown, about a family that encounters an American GI in 1943 set in Tiger Bay, premiered in the Donmar Warehouse in February 2023.

== Notable residents ==
- Singer and performer Dame Shirley Bassey
- Singer and performer Patti Flynn
- Light-heavyweight boxer Redvers Sangoe
- Rugby league players Billy Boston, Colin Dixon and Roy Francis.
- Headteacher and community activist Betty Campbell

== Sport ==
- The Tiger Bay Brawlers are a roller derby league founded in April 2010.
- Tiger Bay Youth run football teams for all age groups in the South of Cardiff.

== HMS Tiger Bay ==
During the Falklands War in 1982, the Argentine Z-28 patrol boat ARA Islas Malvinas GC82 was captured by the Type 42 destroyer HMS Cardiff. Brought into service with the Royal Navy, the crew subsequently renamed her HMS Tiger Bay. Stationed in Portsmouth Harbour for a period, she was sold for scrap in 1986.

== See also ==
- Black Welsh people
- Butetown History and Art Centre
- Sailortown (dockland)
