= Butetown =

District and community in Cardiff, Wales

Coordinates: 51.467°N 3.166°W

- Community
- Location within Cardiff
- Principal area: Cardiff
- Country: Wales
- Sovereign state: United Kingdom
- Police: South Wales
- Fire: South Wales
- Ambulance: Welsh
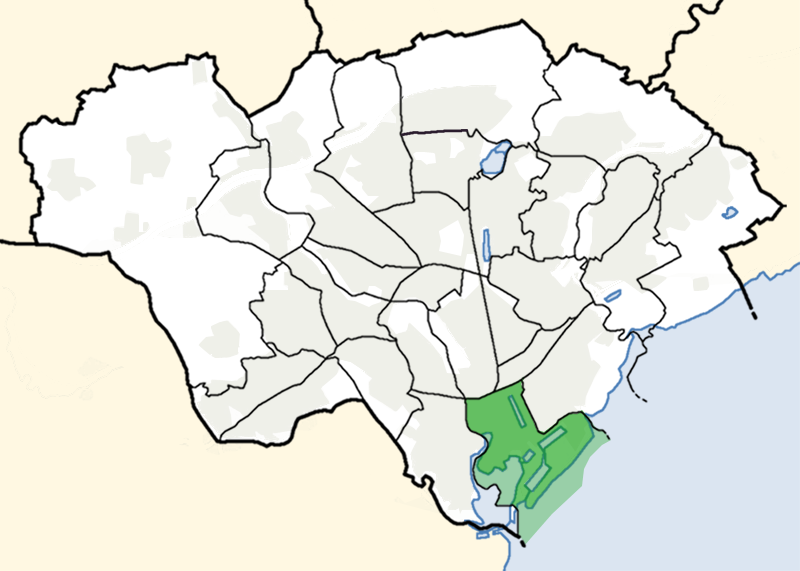
- List of places UK Wales Cardiff

Butetown (or The Docks, Welsh: Tre-biwt) is a district and community in the south of the city of Cardiff, the capital of Wales. It was originally a model housing estate built in the early 19th century by the 2nd Marquess of Bute, for whose title the area was named.

Commonly known as Tiger Bay, the area became one of the UK's first multicultural communities. By WW1, seafarers from over 50 maritime nations, including Greece, Sierra Leone, Somaliland, Yemen, were employed on the Cardiff Docks. A Greek Orthodox church still stands at the top of Bute Street.

It is known as one of the Five towns of Cardiff, the others being: Crockherbtown; Grangetown; Newtown; Temperance Town.

The population of the ward and community taken at the 2011 census was 10,125. It is estimated that the Butetown's population increased to 14,094 by 2019.

== History ==
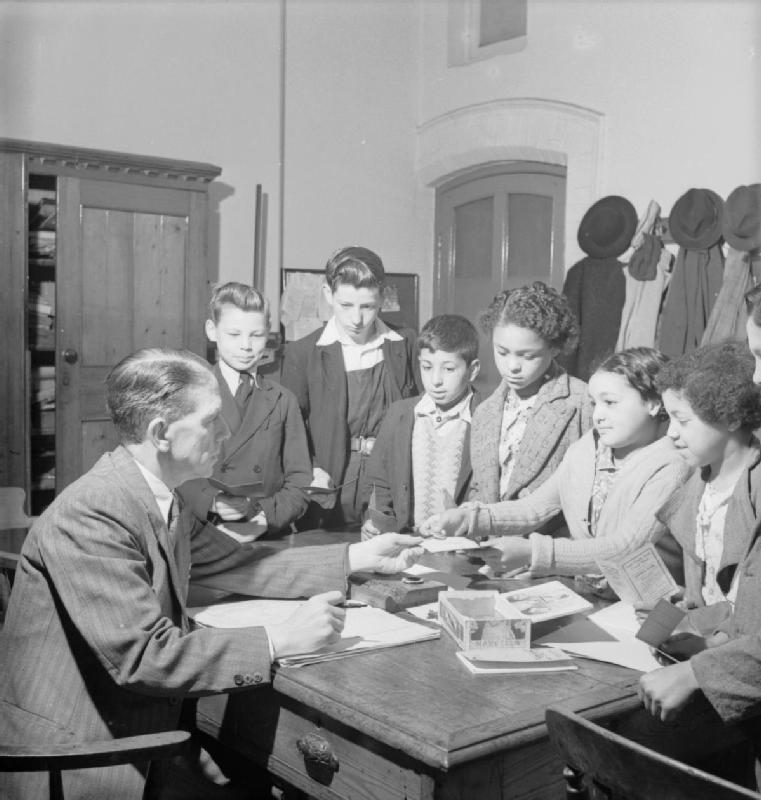
A school in Butetown in 1943

By 1911 the proportion of Cardiff's population that was black or Asian was second in the UK to London, though mainly concentrated in the dock areas such as Tiger Bay. The district was one of the epicentres of the 1919 South Wales race riots, with eyewitnesses reporting six deaths instead of the official accounts of three, and with nearly all arrests made by the Cardiff police being of the local ethnic minority population instead of the white soldiers who had instigated the riots.

During World War II, local authorities attempted to ban Black American G.I.s from drinking in the city's pubs; however, pub staff refused to enforce the ban.

In the 1960s, most of the original housing was demolished including the historic Loudoun Square, the original heart of Butetown. In its place was a typical 1960s housing estate of low-rise courts and alleys, and two high-rise blocks of flats.

In the 1980s, the new Atlantic Wharf development was built on the reclaimed West Bute Dock, and has involved the construction of some 1,300 new houses. Together with the developments in the Inner Harbour and Roath Basin, it was hoped this would spur redevelopment and employment in Butetown, but it seems not to have. The divide between the wealthy Cardiff Bay and the poor Tiger Bay seems as wide as ever, although some of the surviving areas of historic Butetown are becoming prime office and retail locations. With the new Century Wharf development to the west on the banks of the Taff, the housing estate is becoming a little 'boxed in', increasing feelings of exclusion. Over the next few decades, the 1960s housing will require renewal and it is hoped that new development will be more suited to the urban context of the area and will provide a better mix of private and public housing to help fully integrate the community with the rest of the city.

A three-year £13m project to redevelop a shopping parade, community hub, health centre and homes in Butetown began in 2010. The Loudoun Square development will include environmental aspects such as harvesting rain water. The project is a collaboration between Cardiff Community Housing Association (CCHA), Cardiff Council and Cardiff and Vale University Health Board. The facilities and 62 new homes will follow four years of consultation with local residents. In 2022 a well-known mural of Maimuna Yoncana on St James Street which celebrated Cardiff’s ethnic diversity was painted over with a McDonald's advert.

== Demographics ==
The 2011 census included the following demographic information:

- Overall population: 10,125
- White: 65.7%
- Black: 11.3%
- Asian: 9.7%
- Mixed Ethnicity: 5.7%
- Other Ethnic Groups: 7.7%

People identifying themselves as Welsh: 42.8%

== Welsh language ==
The growth of the docks in the mid 19th century attracted a significant Welsh-speaking community to the area. To serve this community three Welsh-language chapels were opened: Bethania, Loudon Square (Calvinistic Methodist; opened 1853, closed 1937); Mount Stuart (Congregationalist; opened 1858, relocated to Pomeroy Street in 1912); and Siloam, Mount Stuart Square (Baptist; opened 1860, moved to Grangetown in 1902). A Welsh-speaking Anglican church also opened in the area in 1856 (All Saints on Tyndall Street; Welsh language services moved elsewhere in 1870). One of the members of Butetown’s Welsh-speaking community was Evan Rees (Dyfed), a worker in the Bute Docks in the 1870s and a future Archdruid of Wales.

The 1891 census showed that 15% of Butetown’s population could speak Welsh, significantly higher than the Cardiff average of 10.7%. Some parts had a particularly high percentage, such as the Loudon Square/James Street area (28%). During the 20th century, however, the percentage declined, although Welsh-speakers remained a recognised part of the local community.

In the 2011 census it was recorded that 928 or 9.6% of Butetown residents (over 3 years old) could speak Welsh. This was a significant increase on the figures for the 2001 census, which were 356 and 8.3%.

== Transport ==
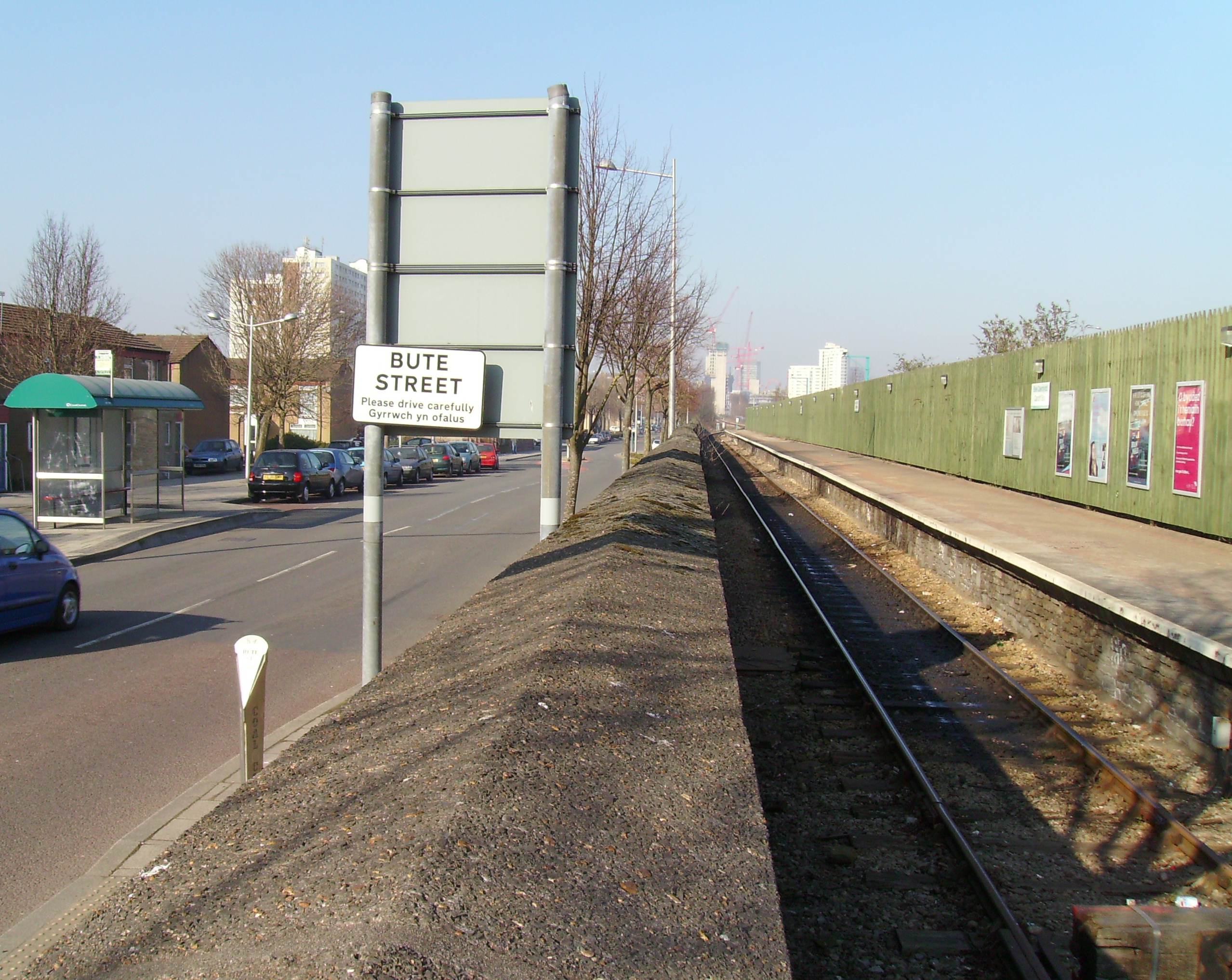
Bute Street (left) and the Butetown Branch Line (right)

The area is served by Cardiff Bay railway station with shuttle services every 12 minutes to Cardiff Queen Street. Cardiff Bus operates the 11 service to Pengam Green via Cardiff City Centre, Splott and Tremorfa and the 35 service to Gabalfa via Central Stn and Cathays. It also on the 1/2 Bay Circle route connecting the area with Grangetown, Canton, Fairwater, Llandaff, Gabalfa, Heath, Cathays, Roath, Tremorfa, Splott and the City Centre. Butetown also enjoys the incorporating Cardiff Bay, thus benefiting from its public transport opportunities such as the Baycar bus route.

Bute Street and Lloyd George Avenue, running parallel, link the area to the city centre. Also, the A4232 links it to Culverhouse Cross and the M4 J33 Cardiff West to the west and to Adamsdown in the east.

== Government ==
Butetown is both an electoral ward, and a community of the City of Cardiff. There is no community council for the area. The electoral ward of Butetown is located in the UK parliamentary constituency of Cardiff South and Penarth. It is bounded by the Cardiff Council wards of Cathays and Adamsdown to the north; Splott to the northeast and Grangetown to the west.

Since the 2022 Welsh local elections, the Butetown ward has been represented by Labour councillors Saeed Ebrahim, Helen Gunter and Margaret Lewis.

== Images of Butetown ==
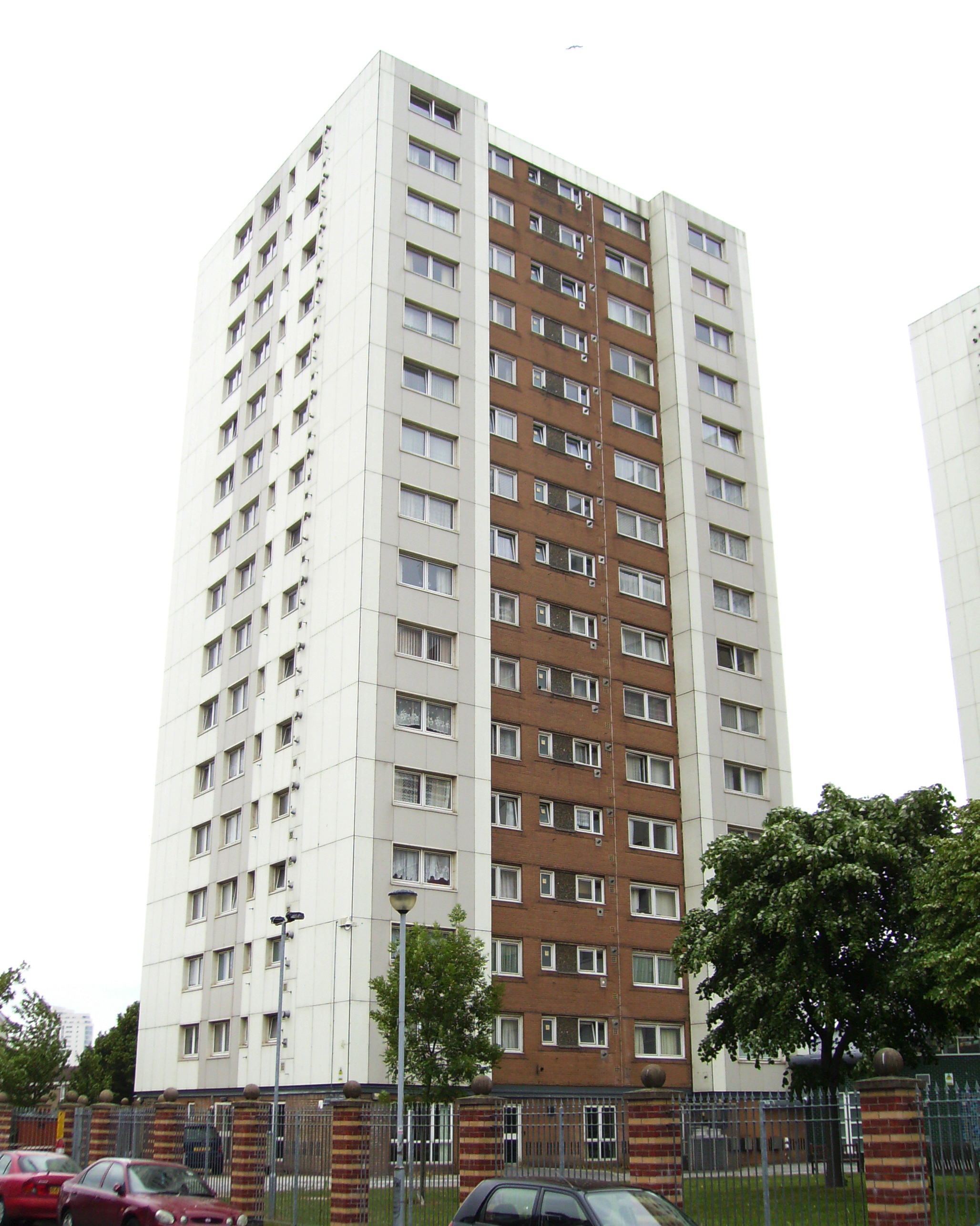
Nelson House,
Butetown

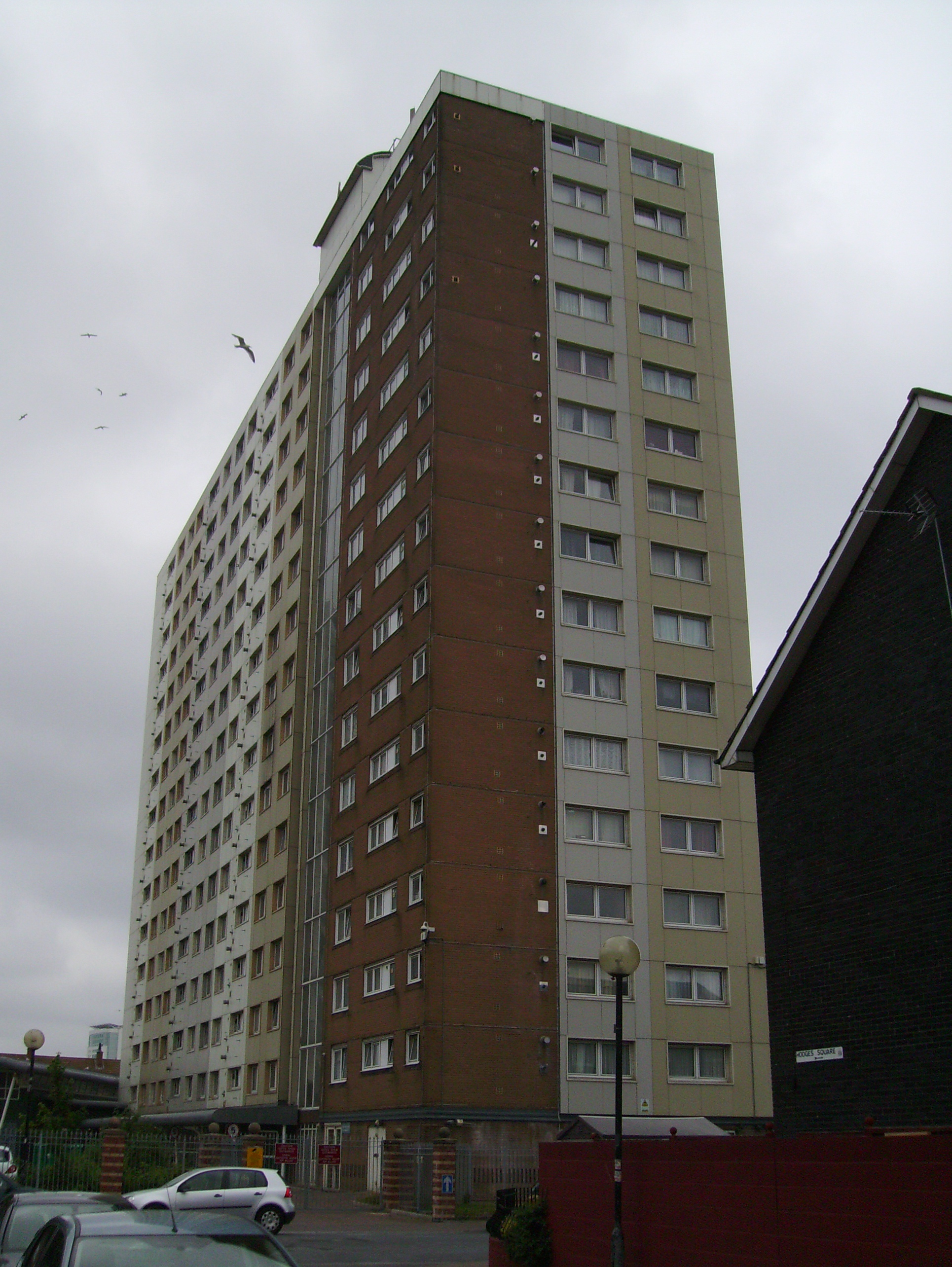
Loudoun House,
Butetown

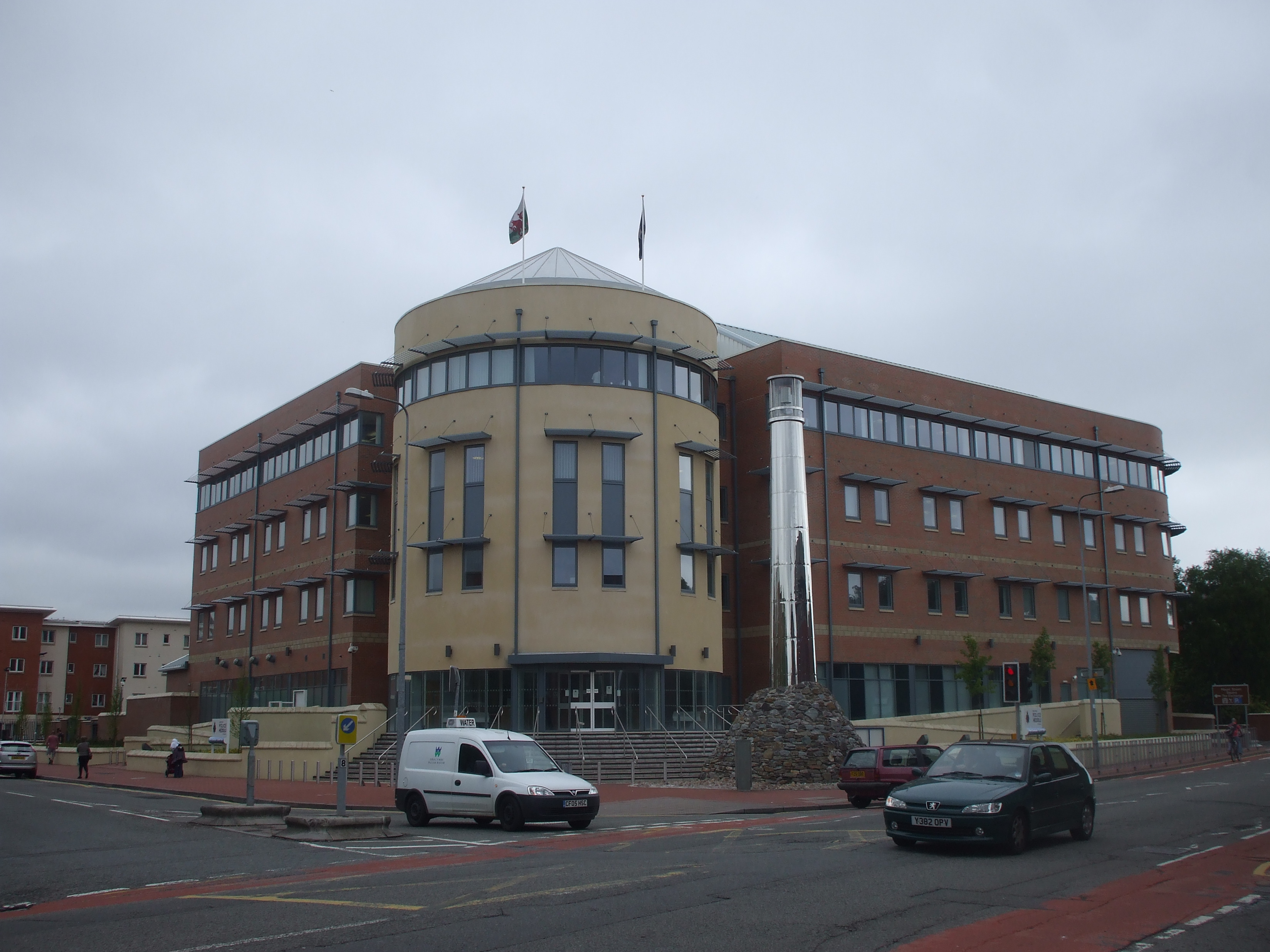
Cardiff Bay Police Station

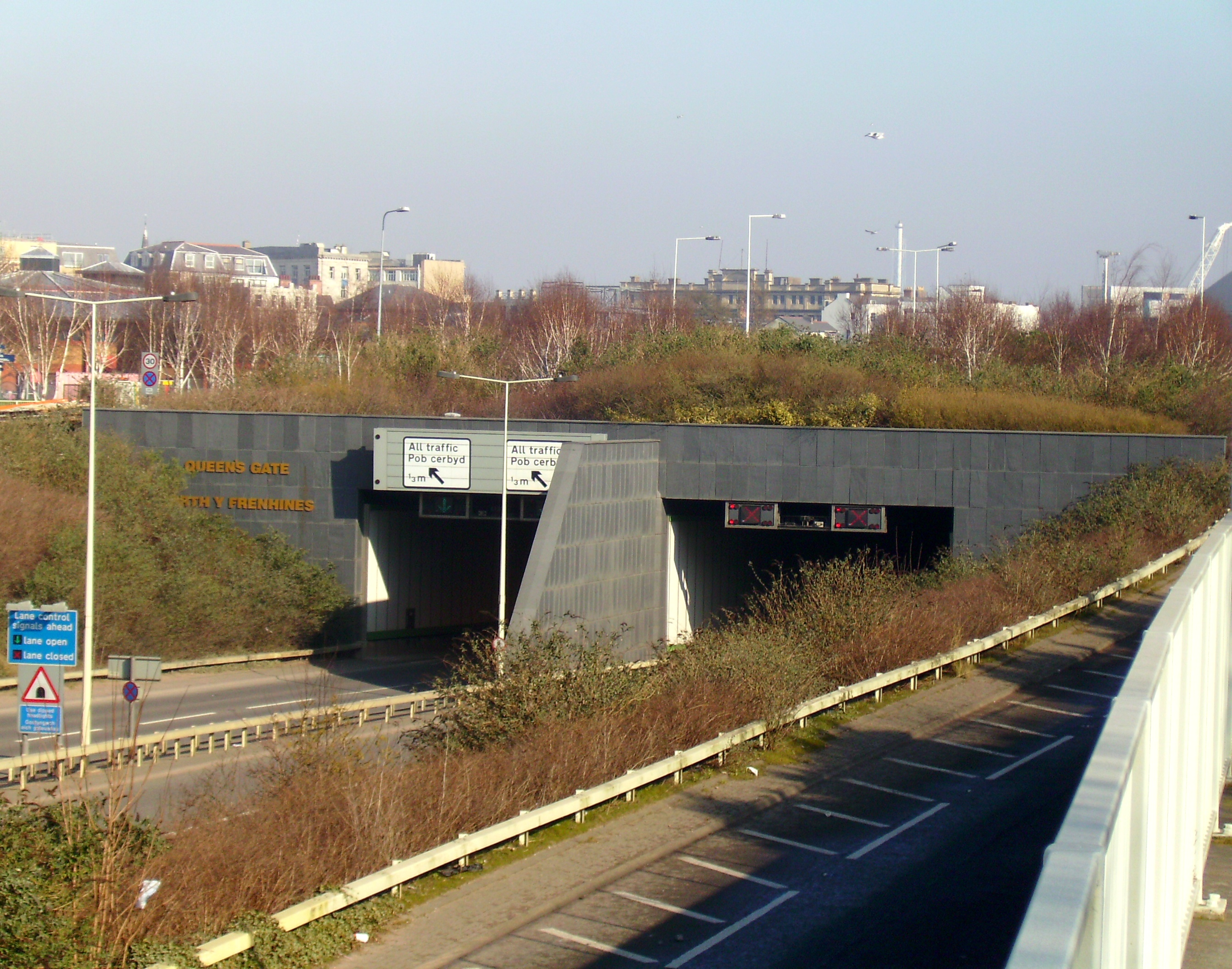
Queen's Gate Tunnel (Butetown tunnel)

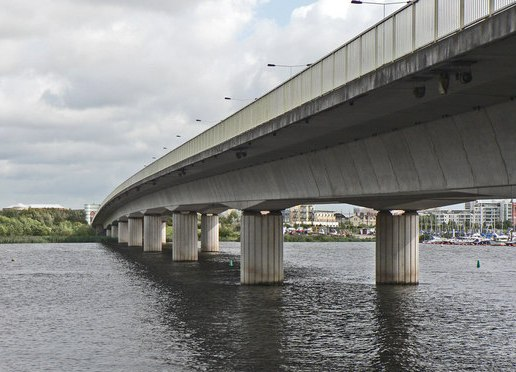
Taff Viaduct
(Butetown Link Road)

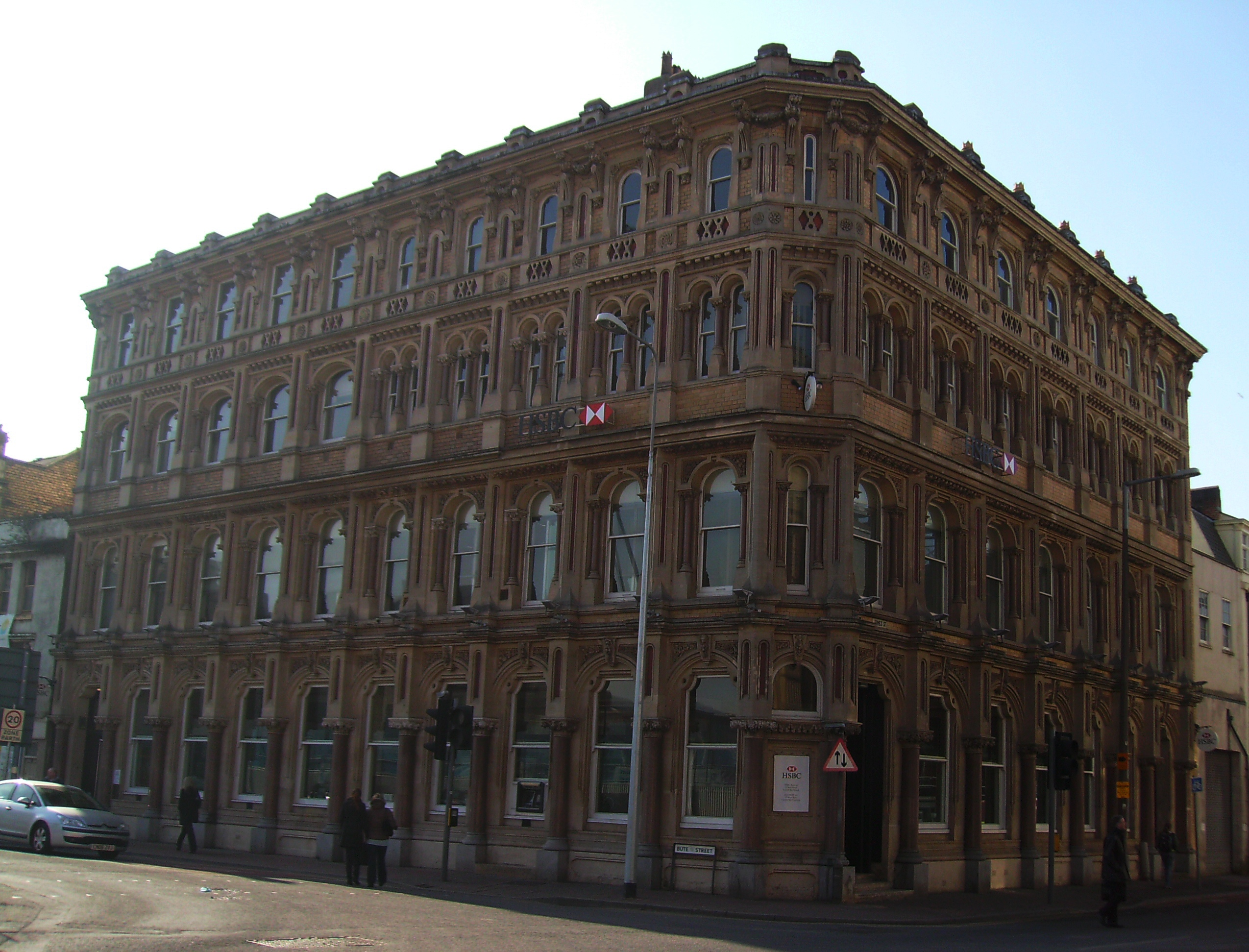
HSBC Bank, Bute Street

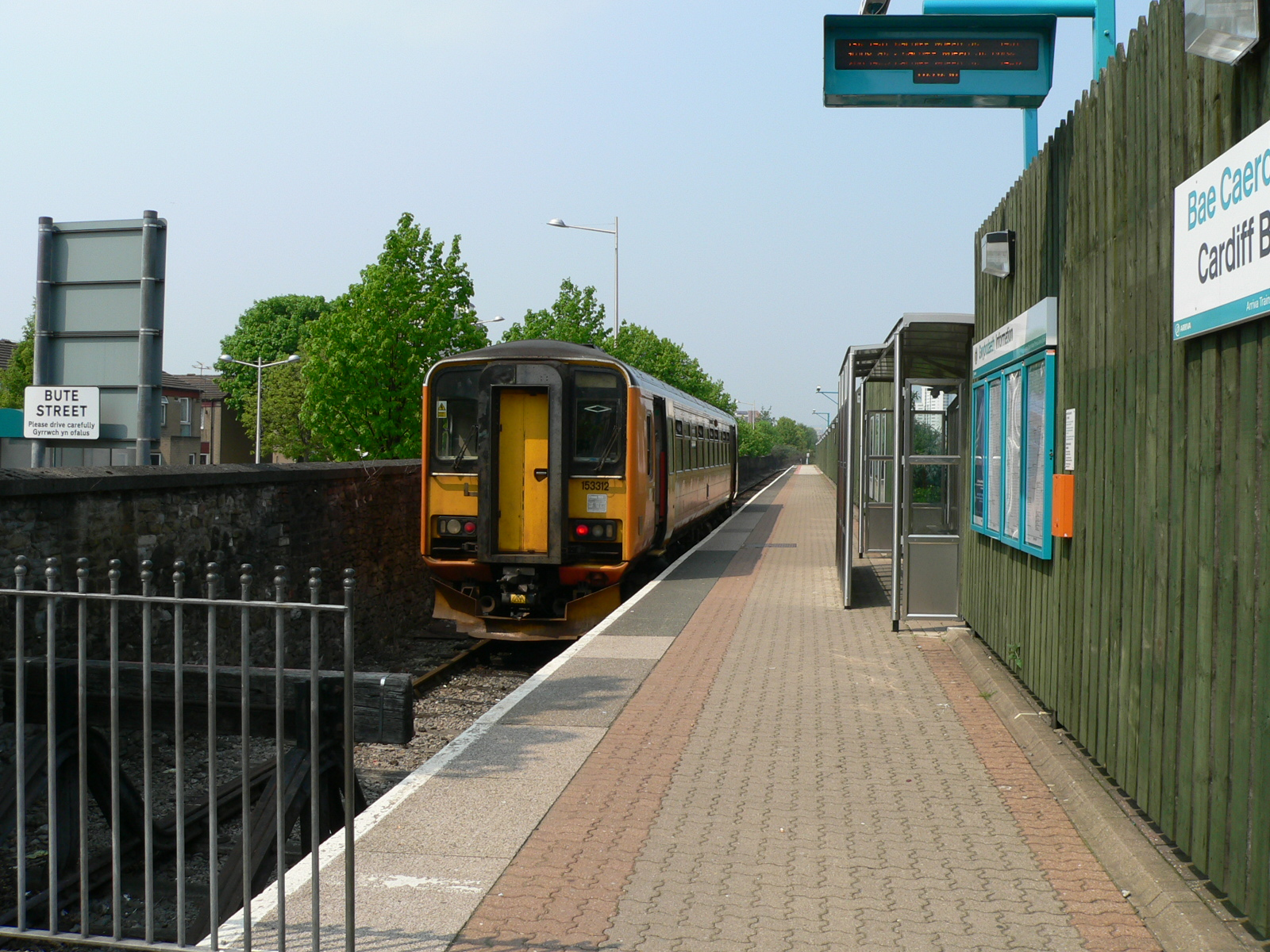
Cardiff Bay railway station

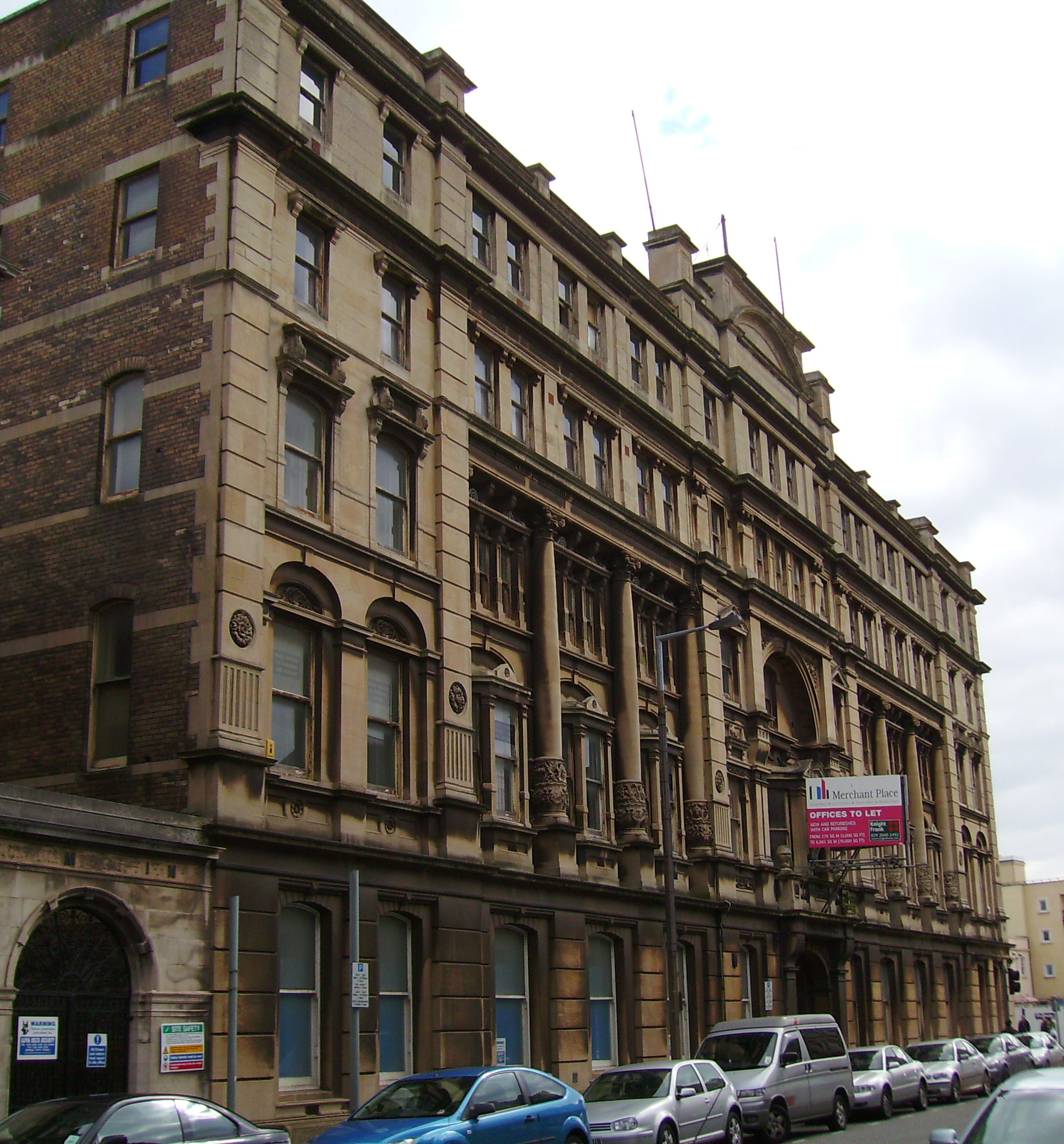
The former Cory’s Building

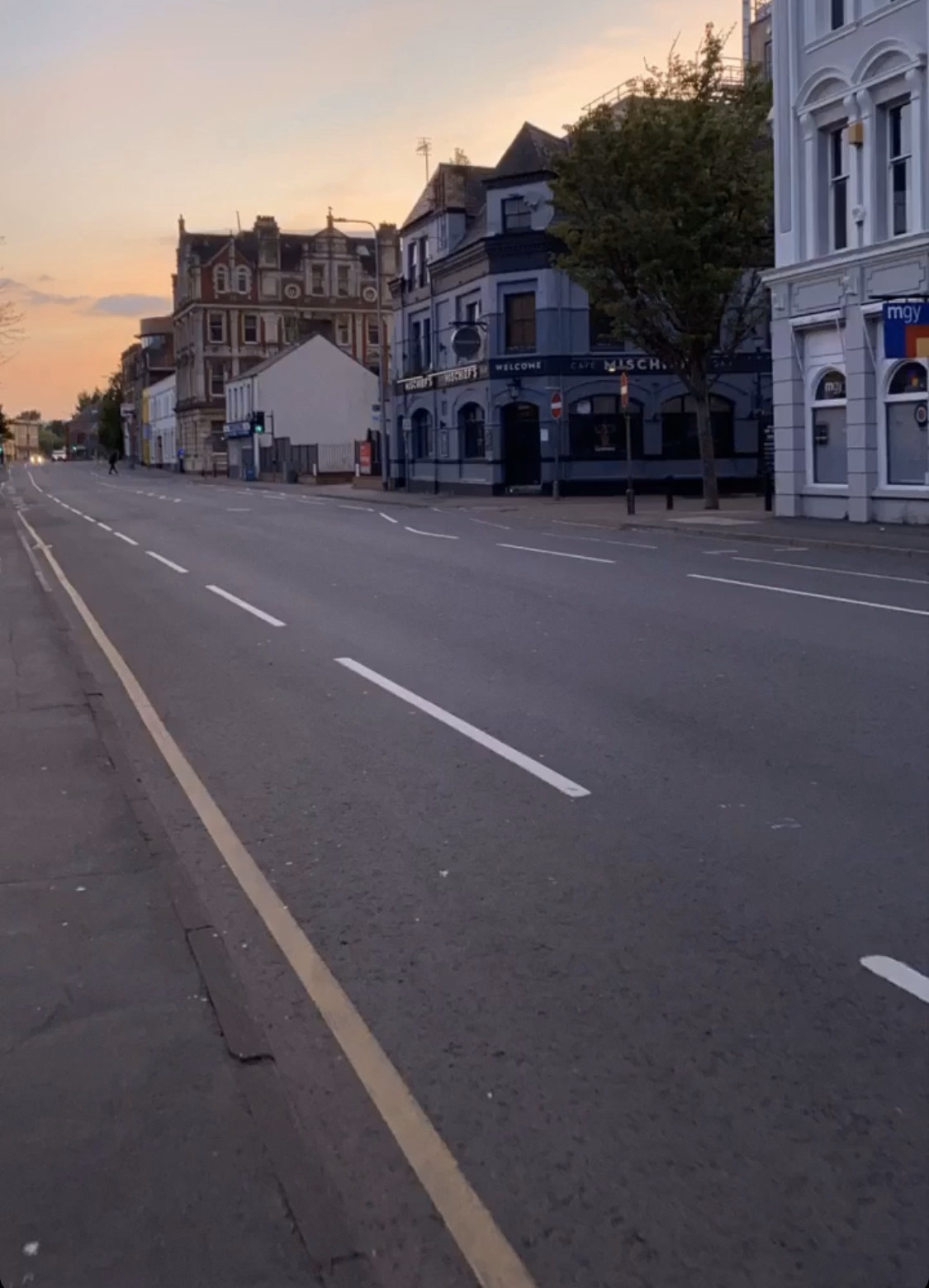
James Street

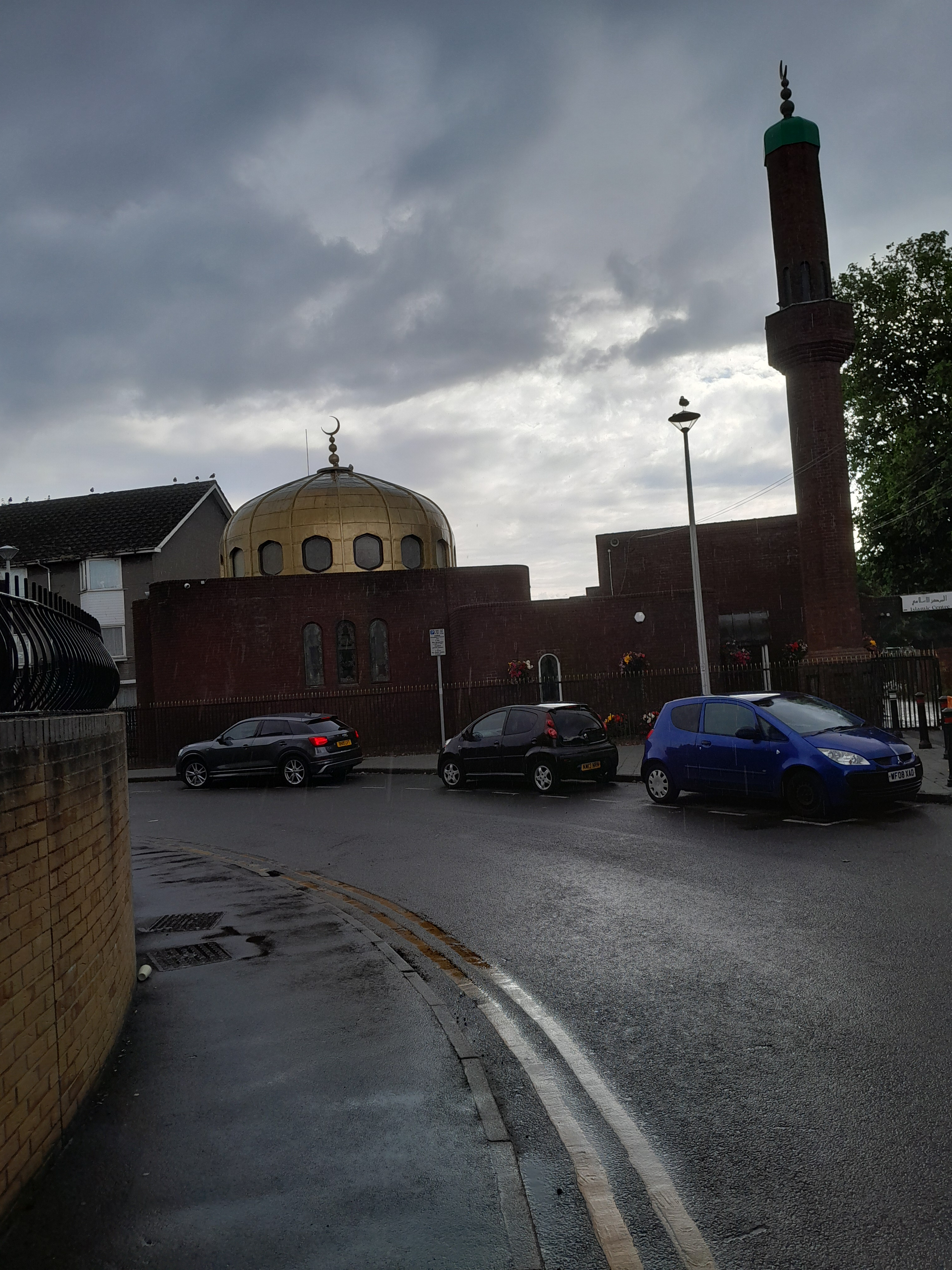
Islamic Centre in Butetown

== See also ==
- Butetown History and Arts Centre
- Listed buildings in Butetown
- Sailortown (dockland)
