= Timeline of Cardiff history =

The timeline of Cardiff history shows the significant events in the history of Cardiff which transformed it from a small Roman fort into the modern capital city of Wales.

The word Caerdyf has its origins in post-Roman Brythonic words meaning "the fort of the Taff". The fort probably refers to that established by the Romans. Caer is Welsh for fort and -dyf is in effect a form of Taf (Taff), the river which flows by Cardiff Castle.

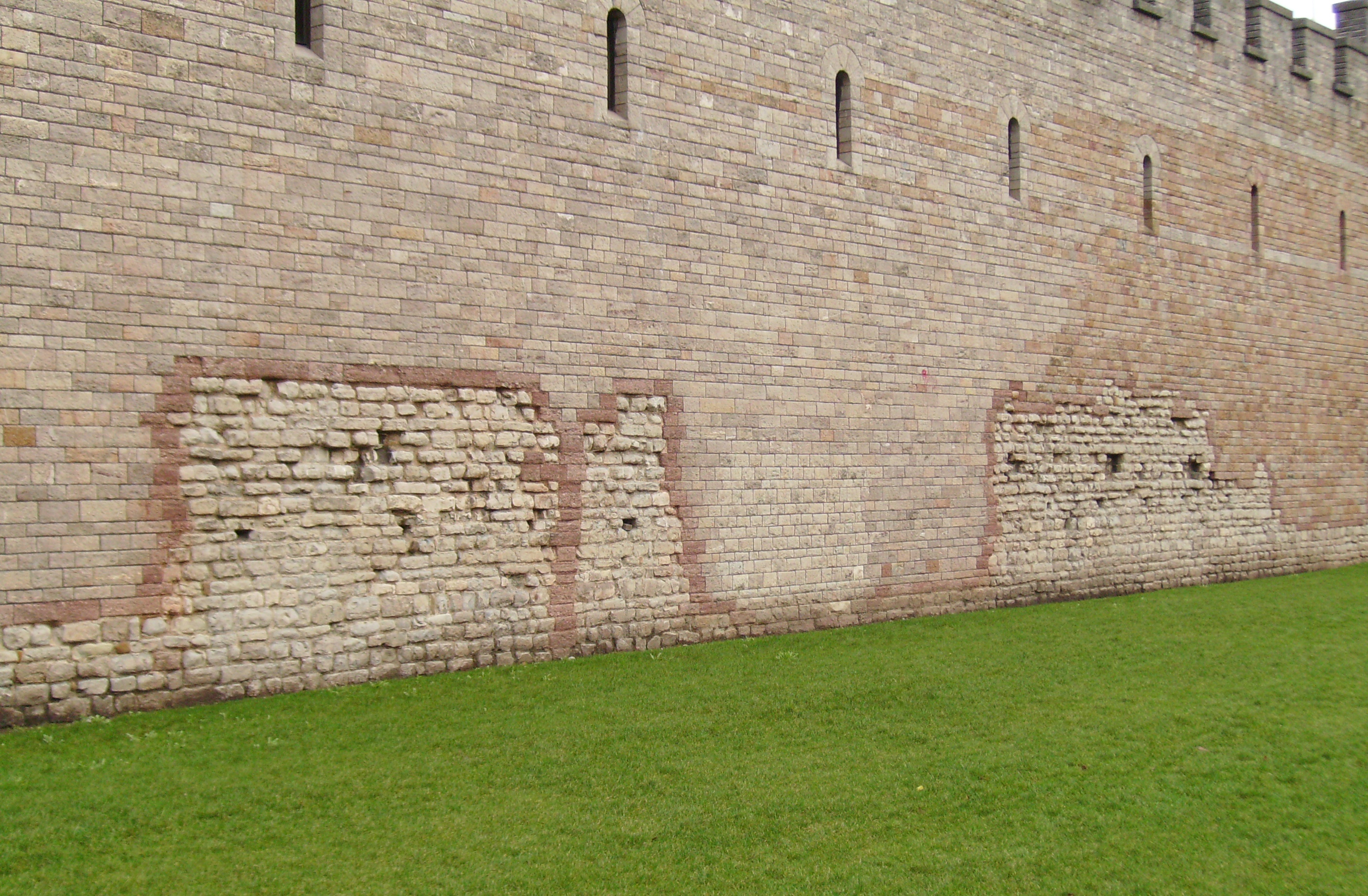
Part of the Roman fort (below the red bricks) outside Cardiff Castle

== The Roman settlement ==
50s AD: A settlement was established by the Romans.

75: A Roman fort at Cardiff, where Cardiff Castle now is, was established.

380s: The Romans abandoned Cardiff.

== The Viking settlement ==
850: The Vikings attacked the Welsh coast. They used Cardiff as a base and then as a port. Street names such as Dumballs Road and Womanby Street come from the Vikings.

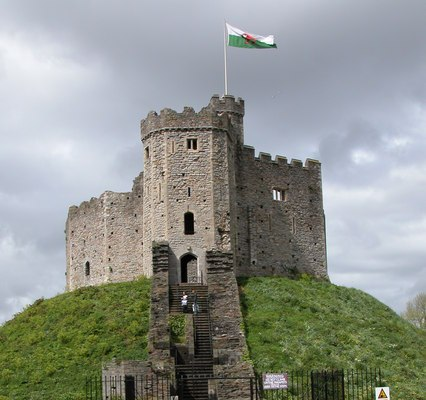
The Norman keep, Cardiff Castle

== The Norman town ==
1081: William the Conqueror led an army through southern Wales and may have erected defences at Cardiff on the site of the old Roman fort.

1100: A small town outside the castle was establishing itself. It was made up primarily of settlers Norman/Saxon people.

1111: Cardiff town walls were first mentioned by Caradoc of Llancarfan in his book Brut y Tywysogion.

1126: Ralph "Prepositus de Kardi" took up office as the first Mayor of Cardiff.

1158: Ifor Bach, Lord of Senghenydd attacked Cardiff Castle and carried off William of Gloucester, Lord of Glamorgan.

1180: St John the Baptist Church built.

1294: The Glamorgan Welsh attacked Cardiff Castle.

1315: Llywelyn Bren, a great-grandson of Ifor Bach, attacked Cardiff Castle.

1318: Llewelyn Bren executed at Cardiff as a traitor.

1324: Edward II’s charter indicates that "Cardiff had become an important trading and shipping centre."

1327: Cardiff declared a Port of the Staple.

1340: Hugh le Despenser "grants an important early charter."

1404: Owain Glyndŵr captured Cardiff Castle.

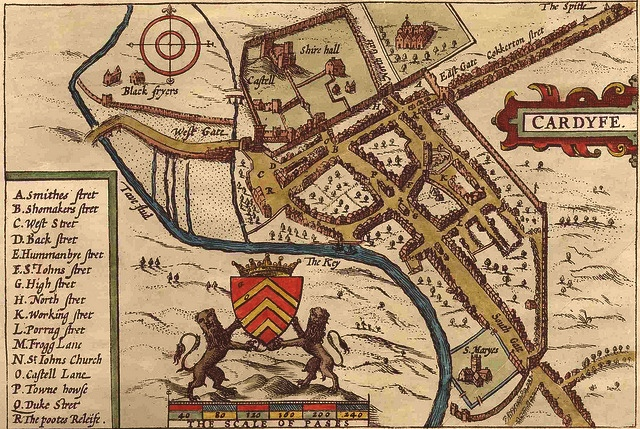
John Speed's map of Cardyfe (Cardiff)

== The county town of Glamorganshire ==
1536: The legislative union of England and Wales (Laws in Wales Acts 1535–1542) was established. The shire of Glamorgan was established and Cardiff became the county town and the Herbert family became the most powerful family in Cardiff.

1551: William Herbert, Earl of Pembroke, became the first Baron Cardiff (Baron Herbert of Cardiff).

1542: Cardiff became a free borough.

1574: Henry Herbert, 2nd Earl of Pembroke, began restoration work to Cardiff Castle.

1595: The first shipment of coal was exported from Cardiff docks.

1608: King James I granted a Royal Charter to the town of Cardiff.

1610: A map of Cardiff was produced by John Speed.

1645: Charles I visited the town after the Battle of Naseby.

1648: The Battle of St. Fagans was fought between the Parliamentarian Army and the Royalists. It was the last major battle to occur in Wales; some 8,000 Royalists were defeated in a two-hour fight by 3,000 Parliamentarian troops of the New Model Army with about 200 soldiers, mainly Royalists, killed.

1737: Flat Holm Lighthouse was built.

1766: John Stuart, 1st Marquess of Bute married into the Herberts, the great local landowning family.

1774: An Act of Parliament established the Improvement Commissioners, responsible for paving, cleaning streets and providing oil lamp lighting in Cardiff.

1776: John Stuart was created Baron Cardiff of Cardiff Castle.

1778: The reconstruction of Cardiff Castle began.

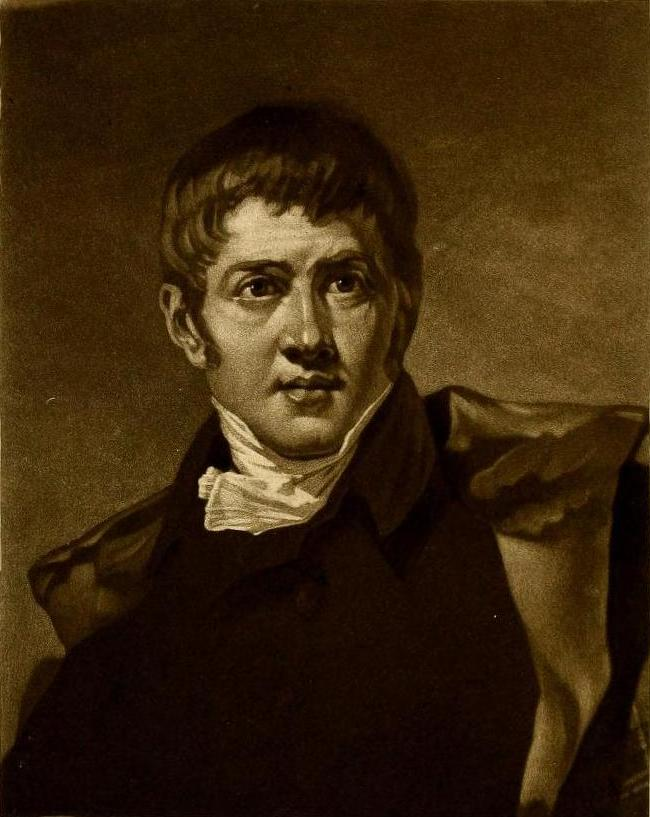
2nd Marquess of Bute

== 19th-century growth of Cardiff ==
1793: John Crichton-Stuart, 2nd Marquess of Bute was born. He is later described as the creator of modern Cardiff, building the Port of Cardiff.

1794: Glamorganshire Canal opened, it ran from Merthyr Tydfil to the sea at Cardiff.

1801: Population: 1,870.

1815: Boat service between Cardiff and Bristol was established, running twice a week.

1819: Cardiff Free School for boys and girls was opened.

1821: Cardiff Gas Works was established.

1826: The first theatre in Cardiff, the Theatre Royal, was opened.

1831: Population: 6,187.

1832: A new county gaol was built in the Spital Field (the site of the present Cardiff Prison).

1835: Elections take place on 26 December to Cardiff's new Borough Council.

1836: The first meeting of Cardiff's Borough Council takes place on 1 January. Thomas Revel Guest became the first elected Mayor of Cardiff and also Judge of the Borough Court of Record.

1839: West Bute Dock opened.

1840: The first railway station in Cardiff opened at Crockherbtown, owned by the Taff Vale Railway. The service ran from Cardiff to Navigation House (now Abercynon). The line was extended from Navigation House to Merthyr Tydfil in 1841 (the Taff Vale Railway, DSM Barrie 1969).

1850: Cardiff Water Company was established to provide water for Cardiff.

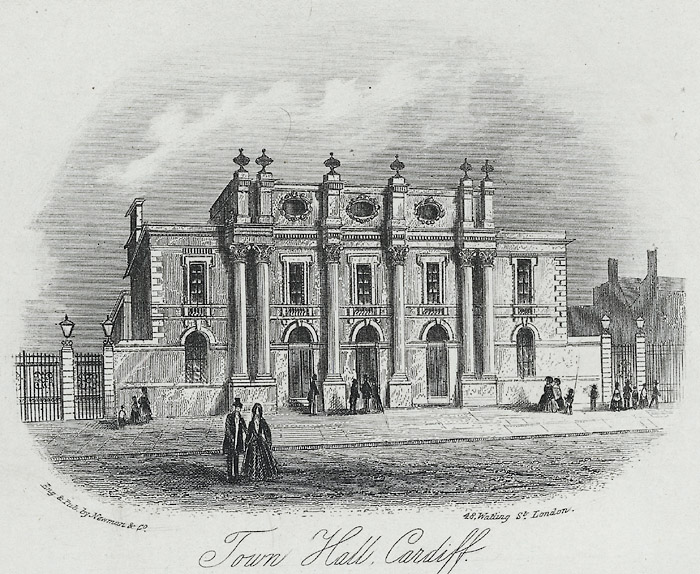
Cardiff Town Hall

1853: The new Town Hall opened.

1855: The Taff Vale Railway began a train service from the Rhondda Valley to Cardiff.

1857: The last public execution in Cardiff was held.

1857: The Cardiff Times was published from 1857 to 1928.

1858: Rhymney Railway opened a main line and a limited passenger service.

1859: Cardiff Bridge was built, a new stone bridge.

1860: The Principality Building Society was established.

1861: Population: 32,954.

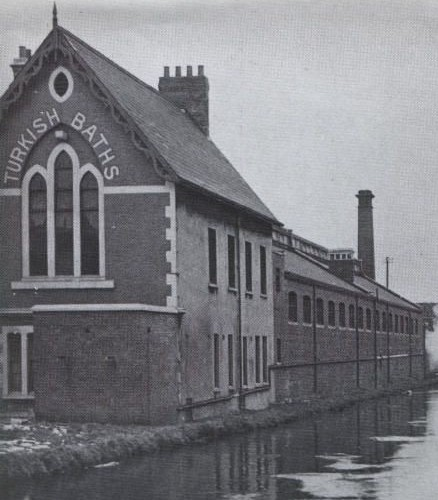
Cardiff Victorian Turkish Baths

1862: The Guildford Crescent Baths were opened in April by the Cardiff Baths Company Ltd, including two swimming pools, a Victorian Turkish bath and a gymnasium.

1863: The Royal Arcade opened, the first of many shopping arcades in Cardiff.

1865: James Howell established Howells department store.

1867: Cardiff Cricket Club was established with Cardiff Arms Park as its ground.

1867: Western Mail founded by John Crichton-Stuart, 3rd Marquess of Bute.

1872: Cardiff Castle Clock Tower was completed.

1873: Swiss Bridge, Cardiff Castle built for John Crichton-Stuart, 3rd Marquess of Bute.

1876: Cardiff Arms Park hosted the first rugby game between Cardiff Rugby Club and Swansea Rugby Club.

1879: The Cardiff Town Council took over responsibility of the water supply from the Cardiff Water Company.

1881: The first grandstand was built at Cardiff Arms Park; it held 300 spectators.

1882: Opening of the new Cardiff Free Library, Museum and Schools for Science and Art in The Hayes.

1883: Cardiff Royal Infirmary current building opened.

1883: The National Eisteddfod was held in Cardiff.

1883: Aberdare Hall established, it is University hall of residence.

1884: The Cardiff Arms Park hosted its first international match, a rugby union encounter between Wales and Ireland.

1885/6: In the rugby season, Frank Hancock Cardiff RFC, introduced new 'two-centre' tactical innovation, since adopted worldwide.

1886: The Coal Exchange was opened to conduct trade for the growing industry.

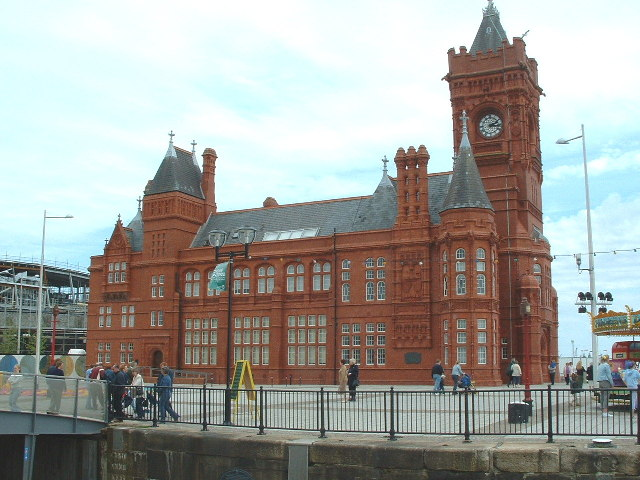
The Pierhead Building

1889: Cardiff became a county borough, Cardiff County Borough Council was independent of the new Glamorgan County Council.

1893: Ivor Novello was born in Cowbridge Road East, Cardiff.

1893: University College of South Wales and Monmouthshire became the University of Wales.

1894: Cardiff Masonic Hall Company Ltd was established after purchasing the thirty-year-old Methodist chapel at Guildford Street.

1895: The first Welsh Grand National hunt race was run at Ely Racecourse.

1897: The Pierhead Building was built.

1899: Riverside Football Club, later to be renamed Cardiff City, was formed.

1901: Population: 164,333.

1903: The first building in Cathays Park, the University of Wales, Registry, was opened.

1904: Cardiff Town Hall opened, later renamed City Hall.

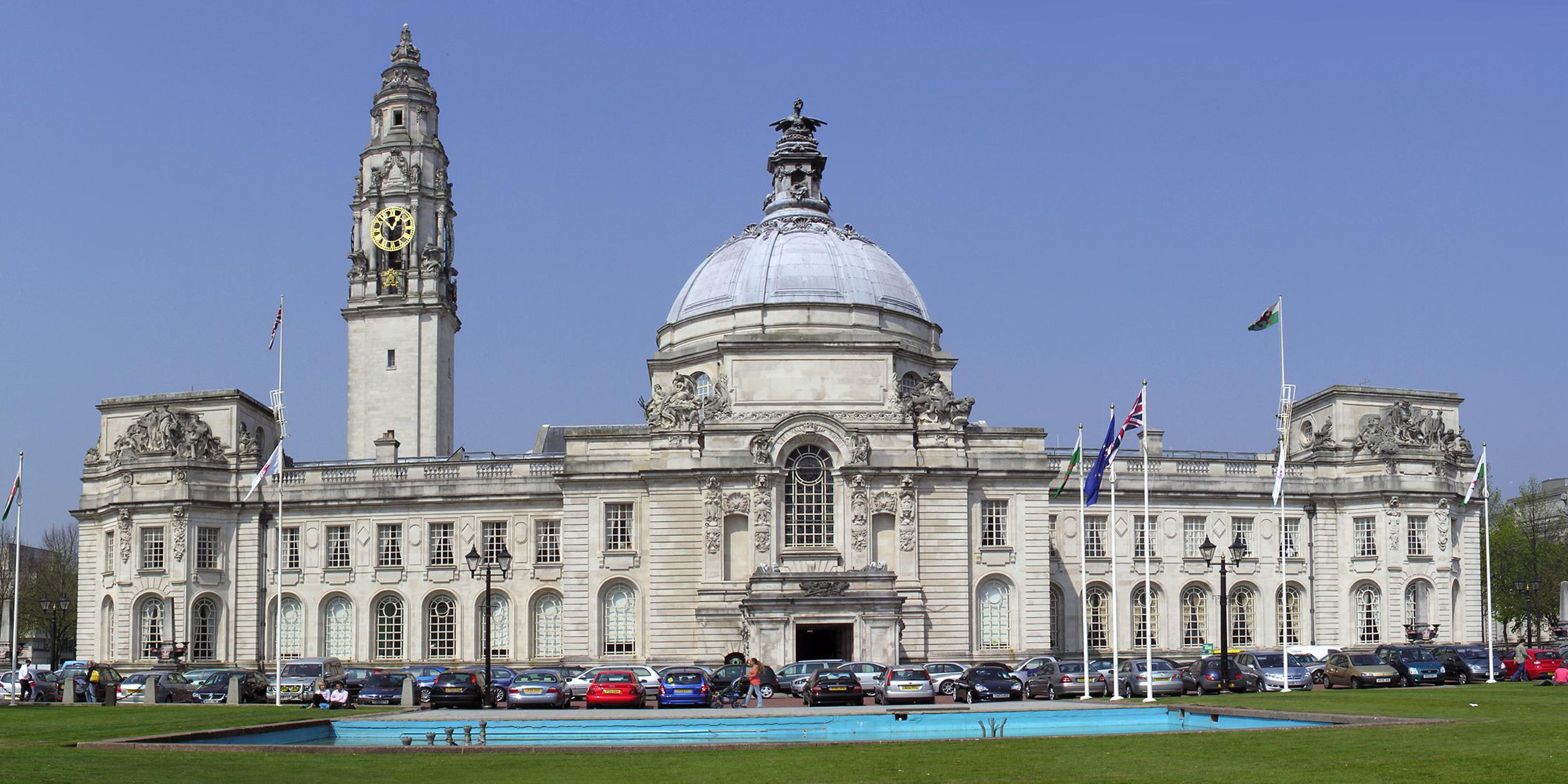
Cardiff City Hall

== The city of Cardiff – the largest coal port in the world ==
1905: Cardiff was granted city status by King Edward VII and the Mayor became the Lord Mayor, with the right to use "The Right Honourable".

1907: Queen Alexandra Dock was opened; it was the largest in Cardiff.

1909: The University building in Cathays Park was opened. The first Clark's Pies were produced.

1910: Cardiff City played their first match at Ninian Park.

1912: National Museum Cardiff established, opening to the public in 1922.

1913: The record amount of around 10.7 million tons of coal were exported through Cardiff docks. This was the high point of the docks.

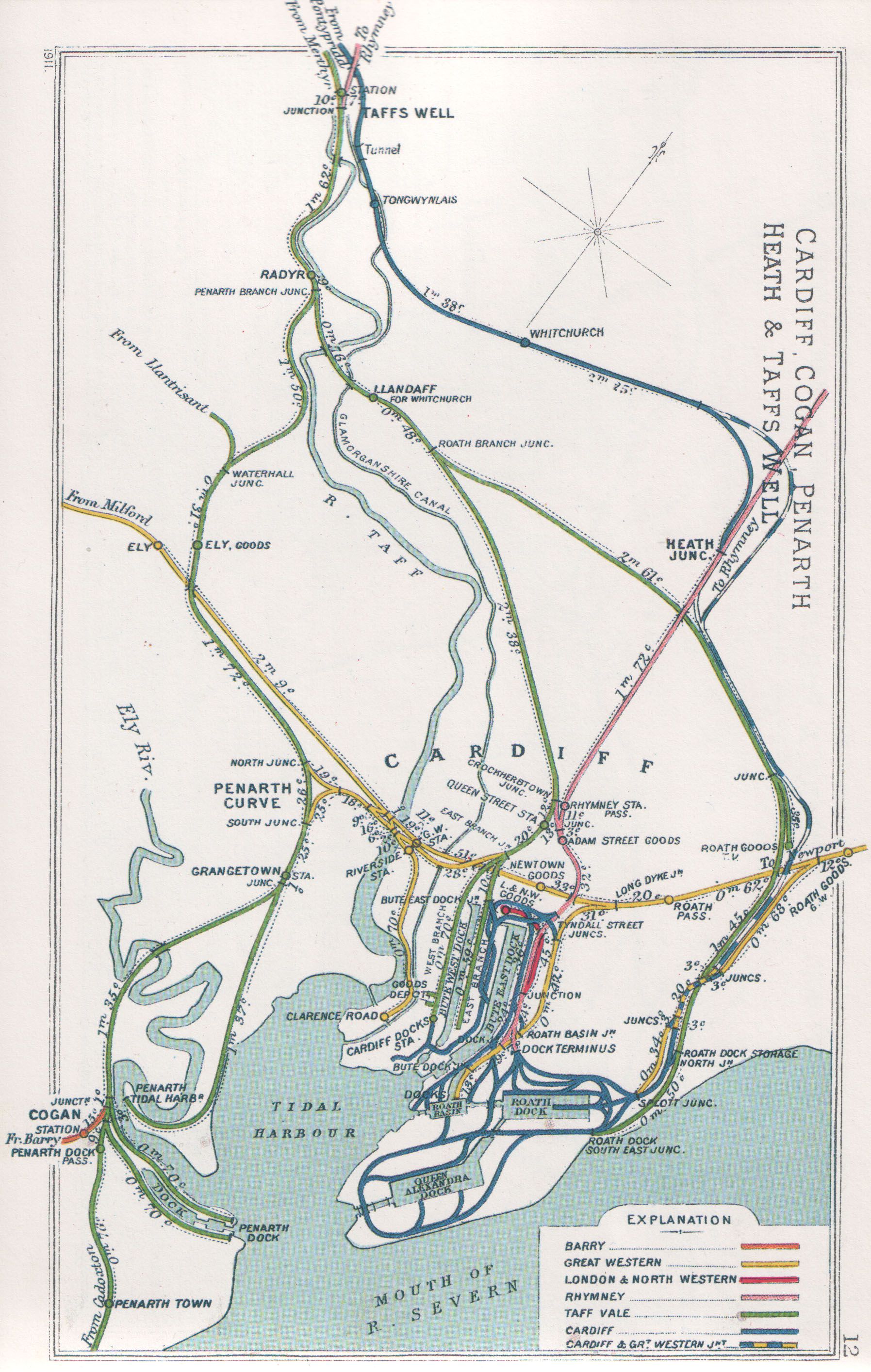
A 1911 Railway Clearing House map showing Cardiff docks and railway lines in the Cardiff area

== The decline of the docks ==
1916: Roald Dahl was born in Llandaff, Cardiff.

1919: Four days of race riots take place in June, leading to the deaths of three men.

1923: The BBC began broadcasting from studios in Castle Street.

1927: Cardiff City beat Arsenal 1–0 to win the FA Cup.

1930: Cardiff Round Table, the local branch of Round Table Britain & Ireland, was founded, being the 26th table in the organisation.

1931: Cardiff Municipal Airport was opened on Pengam Moors.

1932: The first miners' hunger march to start in Cardiff, left for London to protest about unemployment.

1935: The first RAC Welsh Rally started from Cardiff.

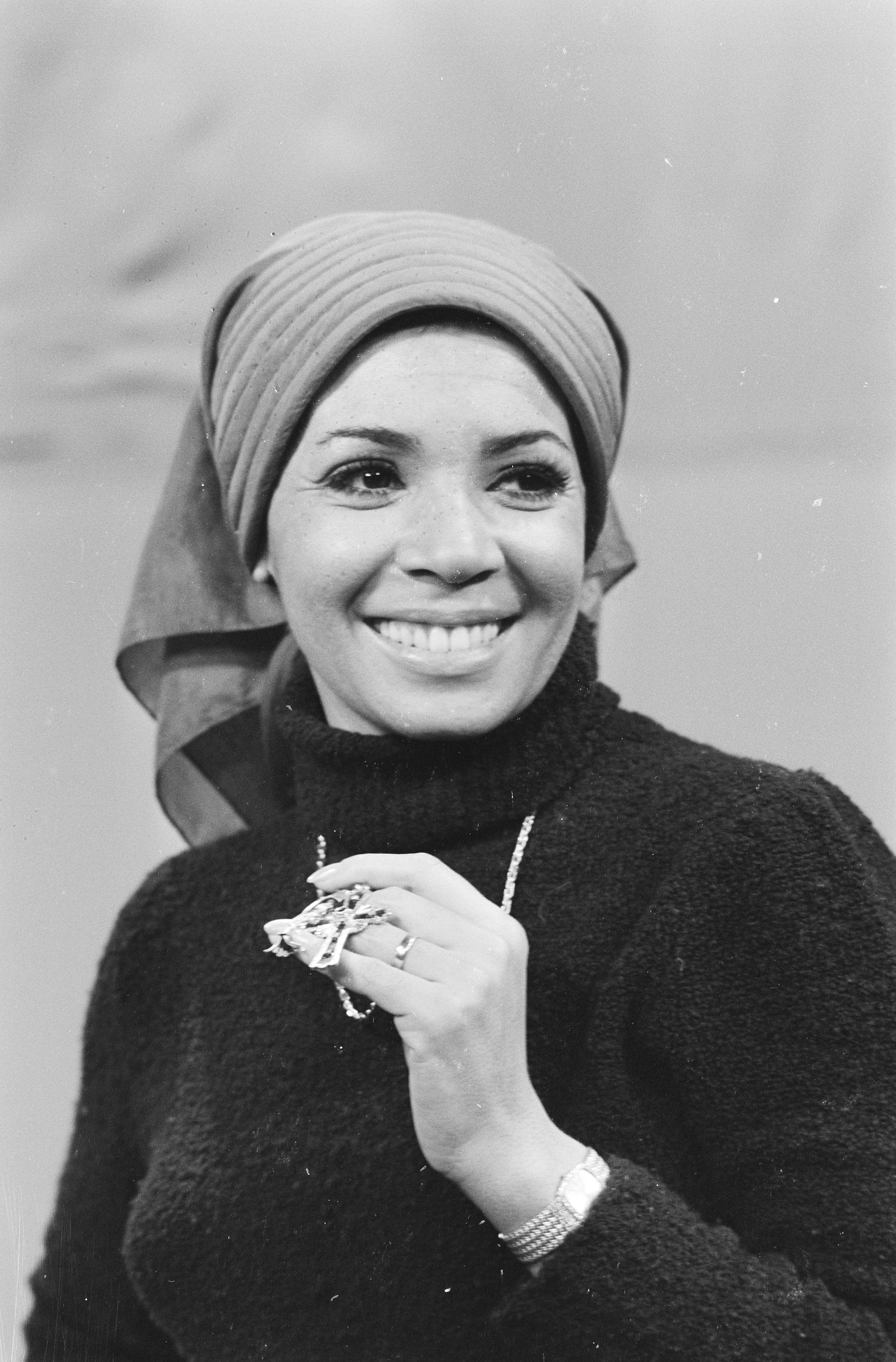
Shirley Bassey

1937: Shirley Bassey was born in Tiger Bay, Cardiff.

1938: The county borough of Cardiff was extended to include Rumney.

1939: Billy the Seal died.

1941: The heaviest German Luftwaffe raid of World War II, the Cardiff Blitz, occurred; 156 people were killed.

1946: Welsh National Opera staged its first productions at the Prince of Wales Theatre.

1947: The Bute family gave Cardiff Castle to the city.

1948: The Welsh Folk Museum was opened at St. Fagans.

1952: The last execution took place in Cardiff Prison. Mahmood Hussein Mattan was hanged for murder, but his conviction was quashed in 1998.

1954: Cardiff Airport moved from Pengam Moors to its current home in Rhoose.

1955: Cardiff was officially recognised as the capital city of Wales.

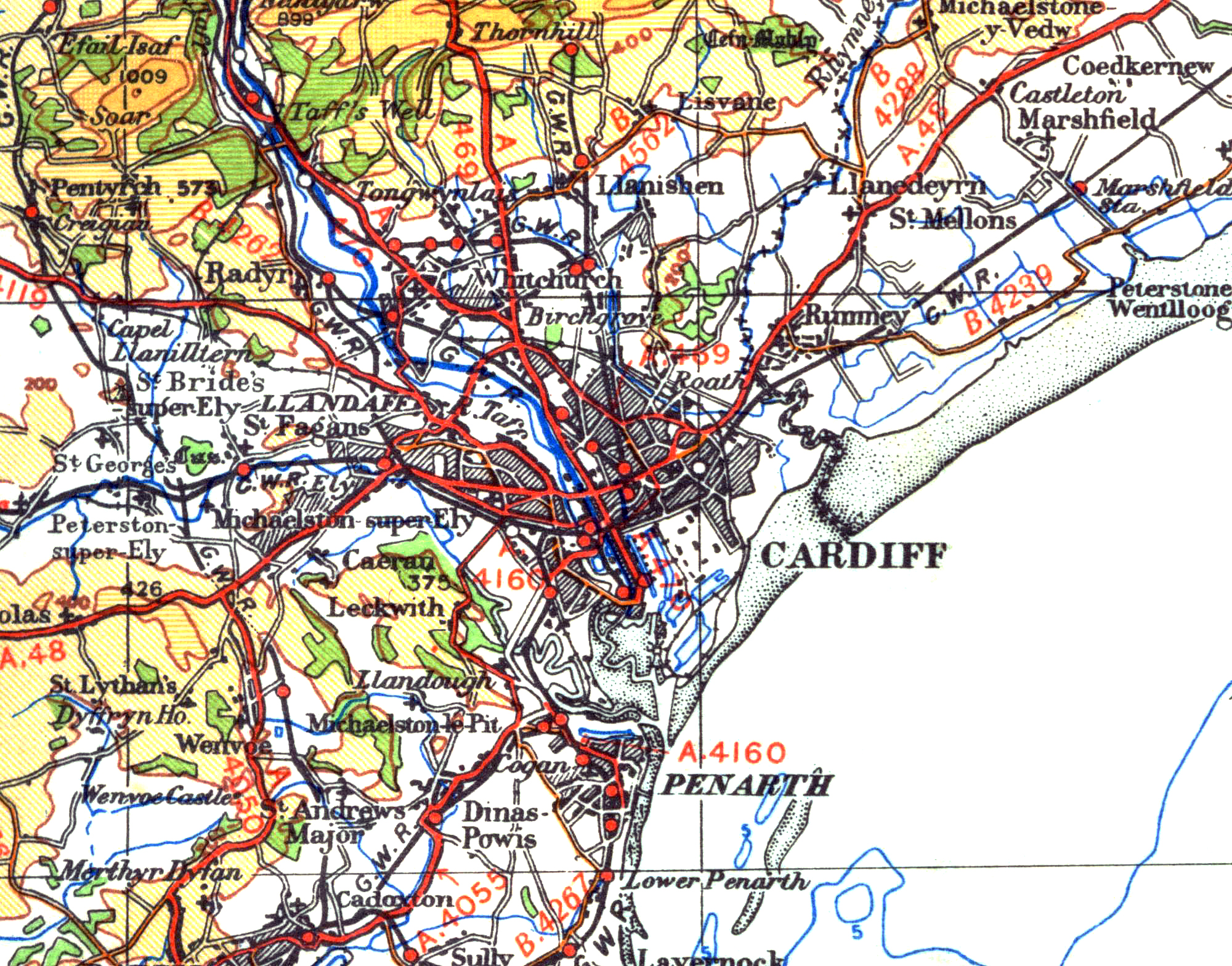
A map of Cardiff in 1946

1956: Cardiff ceased being a fishing port after 70 years.

1958: The British Empire and Commonwealth Games opened at Cardiff Arms Park. The Wales Empire Pool opened for the Games.

1959: The movie Tiger Bay was released. It was partly shot in Cardiff.

1961: Public houses in Cardiff were allowed to open for the first time on Sundays since the 1880s.

1963: The Rover car factory was opened.

1964: West Bute Dock closed as the last shipment of coal, just 229,000 tons, left the docks.

1966: The Heath Hospital was officially opened.

1967: Glamorgan County Cricket Club played their first game at Sophia Gardens, having moved from Cardiff Arms Park.

1970: Bute East Dock was closed. Pearl Assurance House is opened in April, the tallest building in Wales.

1971: The National Sports Centre for Wales opened in Sophia Gardens.

1973: John Desmond Brayley MC DL was nominated for a peerage as Baron Brayley of the City of Cardiff and County Glamorgan.

1974: South Glamorgan was established as part of the local government reorganisation. Cardiff lost the independent County Borough status it had since 1889.

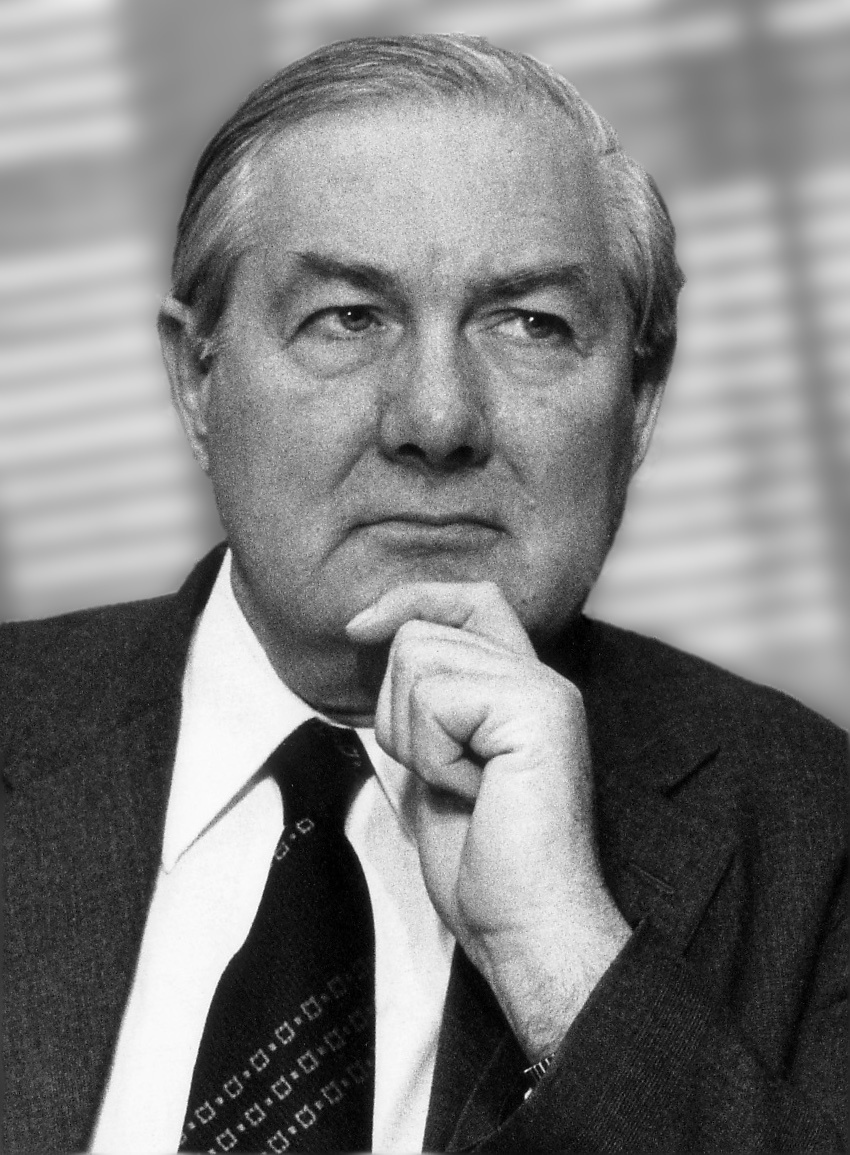
James Callaghan

1976: James Callaghan, MP for Cardiff, became Prime Minister of the United Kingdom.

1977: The Welsh Industrial and Maritime Museum was opened in Cardiff Bay.

1980: The M4 motorway to the north of the city was opened.

1982: S4C, the Welsh-language television channel was established. The Ely Link Road opens.

1983: BBC Cardiff Singer of the World competition was launched.

1984: The National Stadium at Cardiff Arms Park was opened.

1985: The Capel Llanilltern – Culverhouse Cross Link Road opens.

1986: Wales National Ice Rink was opened and the Cardiff Devils ice hockey team established.

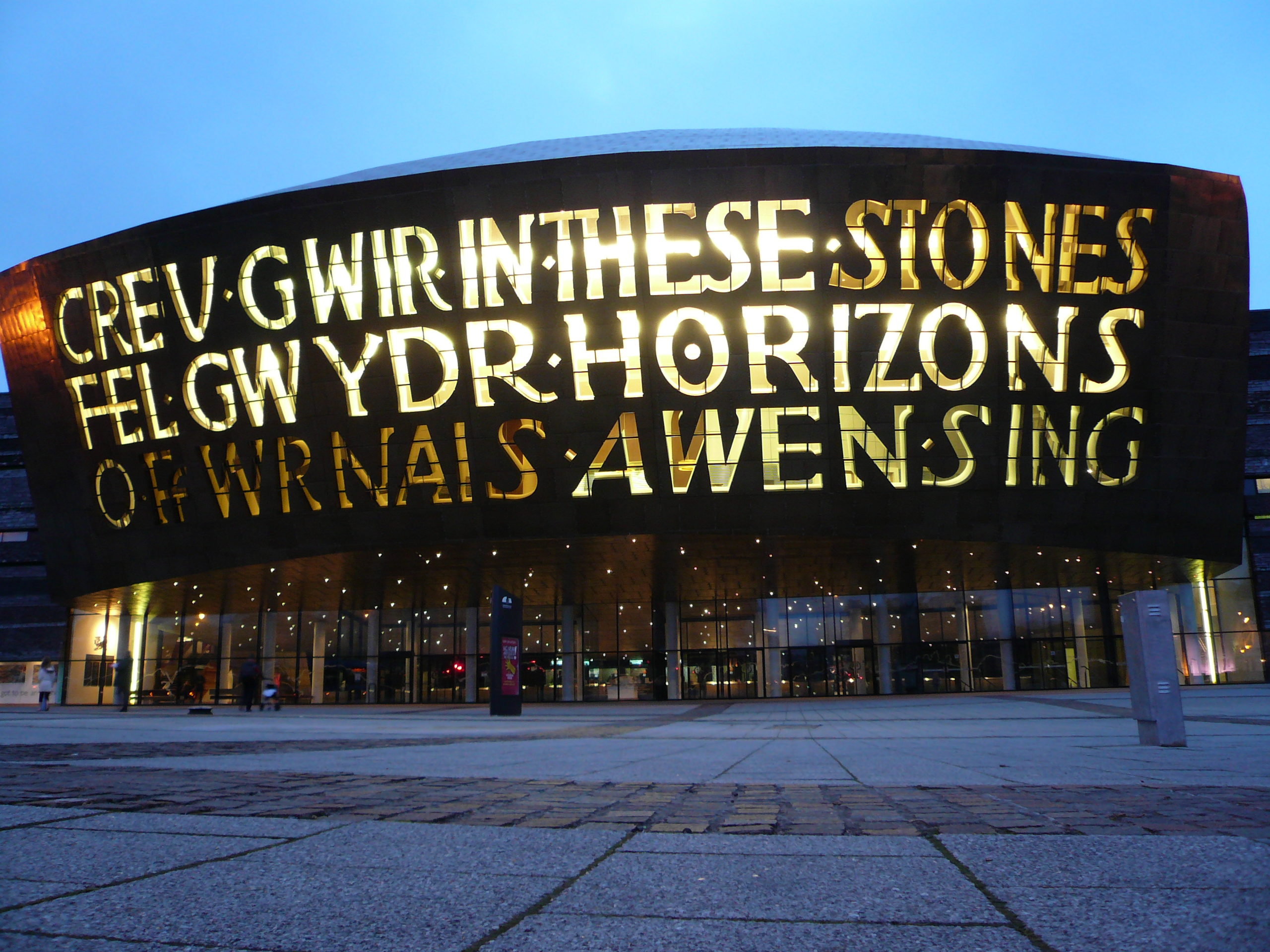
The Wales Millennium Centre

== The regeneration of Cardiff Bay and the city ==
1987: The Cardiff Bay Development Corporation was established to transform derelict land that had been Cardiff docks into Cardiff Bay.

1988: The new County Hall was completed in Cardiff Bay. The Grangetown Link Road opens.

1989: Cardiff Athletics Stadium was opened in Leckwith.

1995: The Butetown Link Road opens.

1996: Cardiff became a unitary authority in a local government reorganisation of 1996. Cardiff reverted to its previous status of administratively-independent city.

1997: Wales voted in favour of a Welsh Assembly in a national referendum, but Cardiff again voted against it.

1999: The Millennium Stadium was opened to host the final of the 1999 Rugby World Cup. The Cardiff Bay Barrage was opened.

2001: The 2001 Census showed that the population of Cardiff was 305,353.

2004: The Wales Millennium Centre was opened.

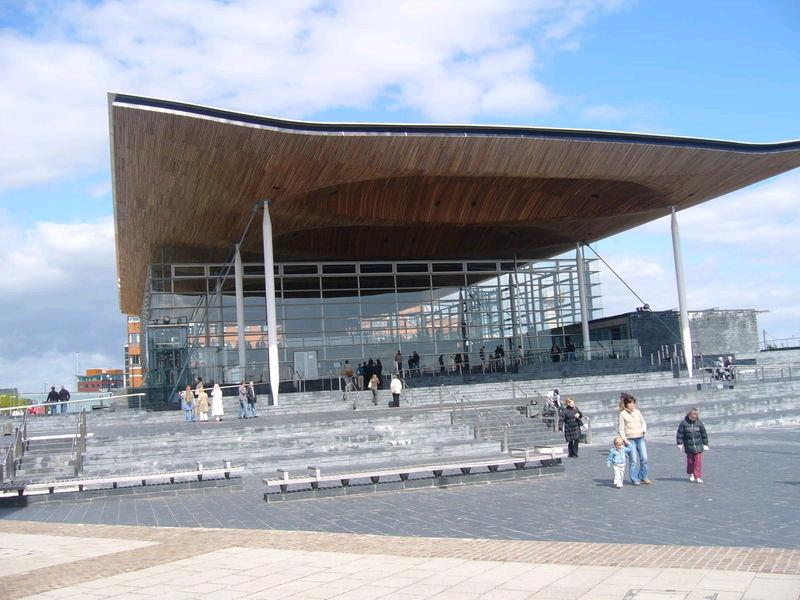
The Senedd

2006: The Senedd, the new debating chamber for the Welsh Assembly, was opened.

2008: Cardiff International Pool opened to the public at the International Sports Village in Cardiff Bay on 12 January, replacing the Wales Empire Pool that had been demolished in 1997 to make way for the Millennium Stadium. The National Eisteddfod was held in Cardiff.

2009: Cardiff City Stadium and Cardiff International Sports Stadium both opened, while Ninian Park was demolished, which was part of the Leckwith development. The new Central Library opened in March.

2010: Cardiff International White Water, a whitewater rafting centre, opened on 26 March at the International Sports Village.

2011: Wales voted in favour of extending the lawmaking powers of the Welsh Assembly in a national referendum. This time Cardiff also voted "yes" to more powers, with over 61% of its people supporting the change. The 2011 Census showed that the population of Cardiff was 346,100, its highest actual recorded figure.

2013: Cardiff City was promoted in the 2012–13 to football's Premier League, 51 years since they were last in football's top tier in 1962, but the first since the Premier League came into being. They were relegated at the end of the 2013–14 season.

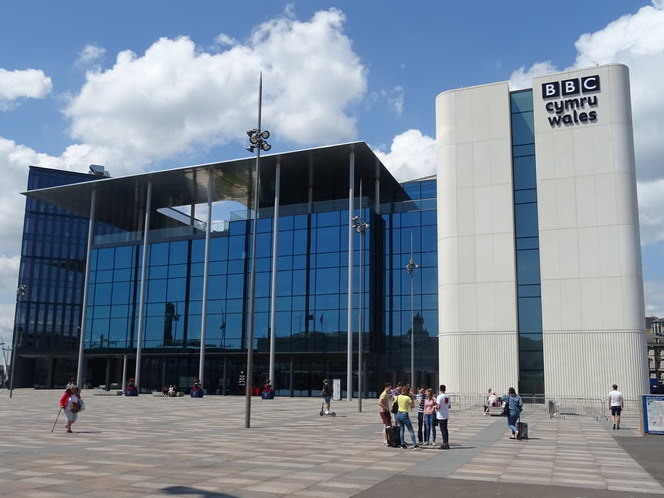
The BBC's New Broadcasting House

2016: Ice Arena Wales opened to the public, while the previous temporary structure, the Cardiff Arena closed.

2017: The first phase of the Eastern Bay Link Road opened, which will eventually complete the Peripheral Distributor Road around Cardiff.

2019: The BBC's New Broadcasting House opens in Central Square.

2020: William Morgan House, a UK Government office building for HM Revenue and Customs (HMRC) and the UK's Department for International Trade, Cabinet Office and the office of the Secretary of State for Wales opened.

2024: Cardiff Bus Interchange opened on 30 June, nearly 9 years after the Cardiff Central bus station closed.

== See also ==
- History of Cardiff
- List of years in Wales

== Bibliography ==
- Thomas, Daniel Lleufer (1910). "Cardiff" . Encyclopædia Britannica. Vol. 5 (11th ed.). pp. 316–318.
