= Cardiff town walls =

Former walls around Cardiff, Wales

- Cardiff, Wales
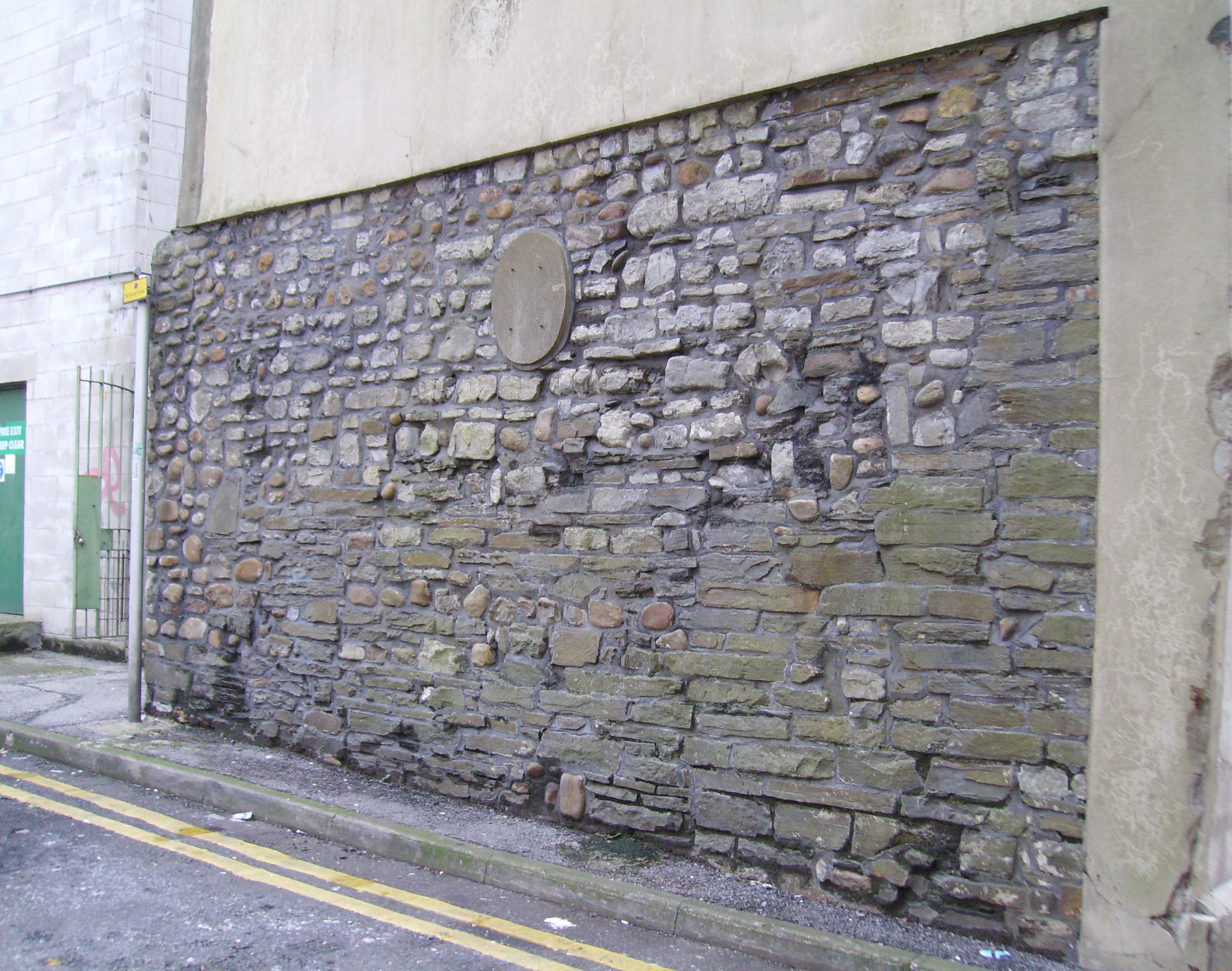
- The largest remaining section of the wall and its location below

Site information
- Open to the public: Yes
- Condition: Small sections remain

Location
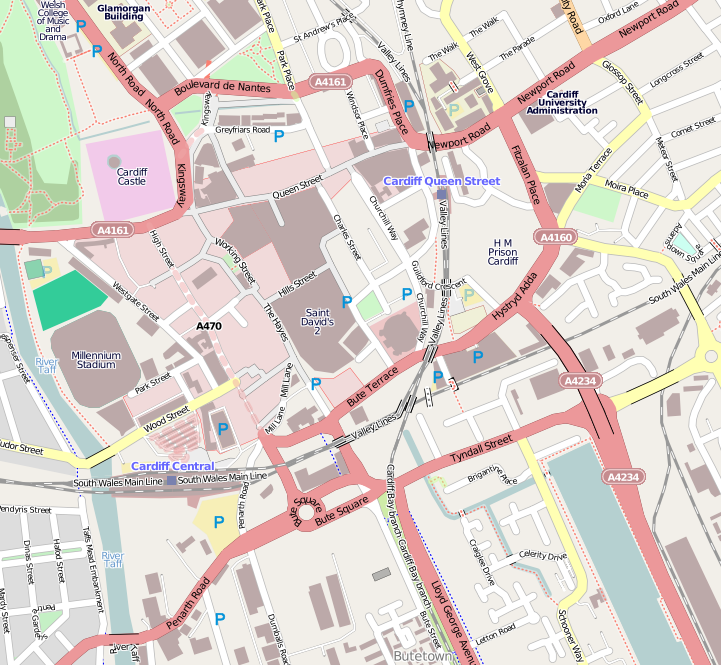
- Coordinates: 51.4821°N 3.1787°W

Site history
- Built: On or before 1111
- Materials: Stone
- Demolished: Parts demolished from mid 18th century

Cardiff's town walls were a medieval defensive wall that enclosed Cardiff. The stone fortifications, which measured 1.280 miles (2.060 kilometres) in circumference, enclosed the area of present-day Cardiff city centre and Cardiff Castle. They were begun by the Norman feudal baron, Robert Fitzhamon, after his invasion of Wales in the late 12th century and were first mentioned in the year 1111. The walls, which had at least five gateways and watch towers, had an average thickness of between 6 feet (1.8 metres) and 8 ft (2.4 m) and a height of 10 ft (3.0 m).

No significant sections of Cardiff's medieval wall survive. By the 18th century large sections had collapsed due to neglect. Other parts were demolished for building material. The last major section was removed in 1901.

== History ==
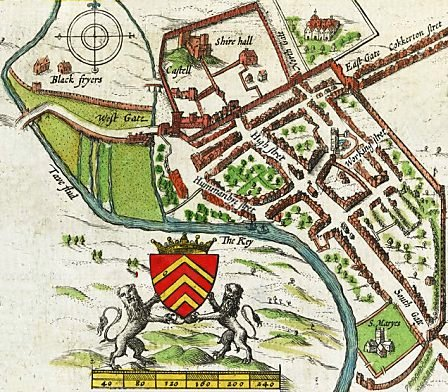
John Speed's map of Cardiff in 1610, showing the town wall gates, but with much of the west wall missing.

The wall was constructed by Robert Fitzhamon the Lord of Glamorgan, and was first mentioned in 1111 by Caradoc of Llancarfan in his book Brut y Tywysogion (Chronicle of the Princes). By 1184, Maurice de Berkeley had built wooden palisades with South, North, East and West Gates. Gilbert de Clare later strengthened the defences of Cardiff Castle and the wooden palisades were replaced by stone walls. The town walls measured 1280 paces or 1.280 miles (2.060 kilometres) in circumference, with an average thickness of between 6 feet (1.8 metres) and 8 feet (2.4 metres) and a height of 10 feet (3.0 metres).

In 1404, forces of Owain Glyndŵr, the last native Prince of Wales, destroyed much of the wall by the West Gate. It may have been that the town was completely burnt down except for the Grey Friary outside the East Gate. In 1451, a charter granted by Richard Neville, 16th Earl of Warwick, mentioned that Cardiff had been re-fortified, with new walls, towers, gates and ditches. A century later John Leland, in his Itinerary of 1536–39, described Cardiff as having a wall with five gates.

During the 16th century travelling writers described Cardiff's town wall as being intact, and it began to deteriorate around 1550 to 1560. In 1607 and 1703 Cardiff flooded, caused by a high tide and heavy rain, which would have caused damage to the west wall.

From the 18th century, the deterioration of the town wall progressed rapidly. It collapsed in sections due to neglect, and stones were then used as building material for other structures. It had become common practice for sections of the wall to be leased to burgesses (freemen of the town), which increased the rate of decline of the wall still further. Some of the wall was used to support the Glamorganshire Canal embankment.

In 1890, one of the last surviving sections of the wall was photographed (image right) at the rear of an old infant school in The Hayes. In 1901, this section was demolished to make way for the Cardiff fish market, which is now 9-11 The Hayes.

== Gateways ==
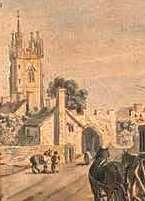
Paul Sandby's original image of the North Gate

Cardiff had six gates; north, west, south, Gulley or Golate, Blaunch and west. However, there is little evidence to indicate that Golate or Gulley Gate was a proper gate instead of just a breach in a section of the wall that had already been ruined by flooding. By the end of the 18th century, all the gates in Cardiff's town wall were demolished. From John Speed's plan of Cardiff in 1610, the Golate was not shown, therefore, it seems likely that Cardiff only ever had five proper town gates.

=== North ===
The North Gate was also known as Senghennydd Gate or Sentry Gate. This was the main gate for travellers heading north to Senghennydd and Caerphilly. Its location spanned the present day Kingssway to the right of Cardiff Castle. It was illustrated several times by Paul Sandby between 1775 and 1776. Not long after Sandby's print was published in 1786, the North Gate was demolished to make room for the increasing traffic and the Glamorganshire Canal as recorded by Cardiff Council minutes 5 May 1786.

=== East ===
The East Gate was known only by one name, Porth Crockerton (Crockerton Gate). The gate spanned Crockherbtown Street, now known as Queen Street, for travellers heading east to Llanrumney and Newport. It already stood when, in 1171, William Fitz Robert, Earl of Gloucester, the Lord of Glamorgan, mentioned it as the eastern boundary of the borough. It has been assumed that it may already have been a stone structure in 1171, while the rest of the walls were still made from wood. John Speed's 1610 plan (above) depicts the gate having a single arch, yet other accounts suggest that the gate may have had three arches. In a Cardiff Council meeting of 20 September 1791, it was decided that the East Gate should be demolished.

=== South ===
The South Gate was mentioned in 1536 when John Leland referred to this gate as Portllongey, which means Shipsgate. Locally it was known as Moor Gate because it led to Soundry or South Town and onto moorlands, today known as Butetown. The only evidence of this gate comes from John Speed's plan and the indication of the location on later maps. The gate stood where today the Great Western Hotel stands. The final mention of the South Gate comes from a Cardiff Council meeting of 1802 when it was decided to demolish the gate and parts of the wall.

=== West ===
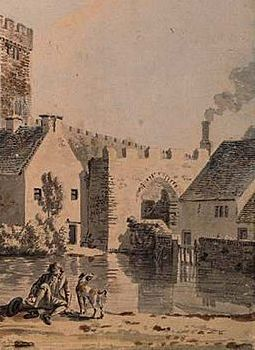
Paul Sandby's image of the West Gate

The West Gate was also known as Millgate or Myllegate, although Rice Merrick (Welsh: Rhys Meurug) referred to the gate as Miskin Gate. The West Gate was first recorded in 1184, when it was still a timber building. A stone building replaced the timber construction and stood approximately 25 ft (7.6 m) high and 25 feet wide. The gate was demolished after 20 September 1781 according to Cardiff Council minutes.

=== Blaunch ===
There are no details known as to when Blaunch (or Blunch) Gate was actually built. It was not in the original palisade town wall in the 12th and 13th centuries. It seems likely that this gate was added when the town walls were rebuilt in the 15th century. In 1542, it was recorded as Blounts Yate, but before that it was known as Wales Gate. Later the name changed to Blaunch or Blounts Gate, named after the keeper of the gate. Nothing else is known about it. It is not shown on John Speed's plan or on a later drawing of 1678. It was later recorded in the Court of Bailiffs on 28 January 1785, that it was "Ordered that the gate near the Quay called the Blunch or Blount Gate be taken out"

== Preservation ==
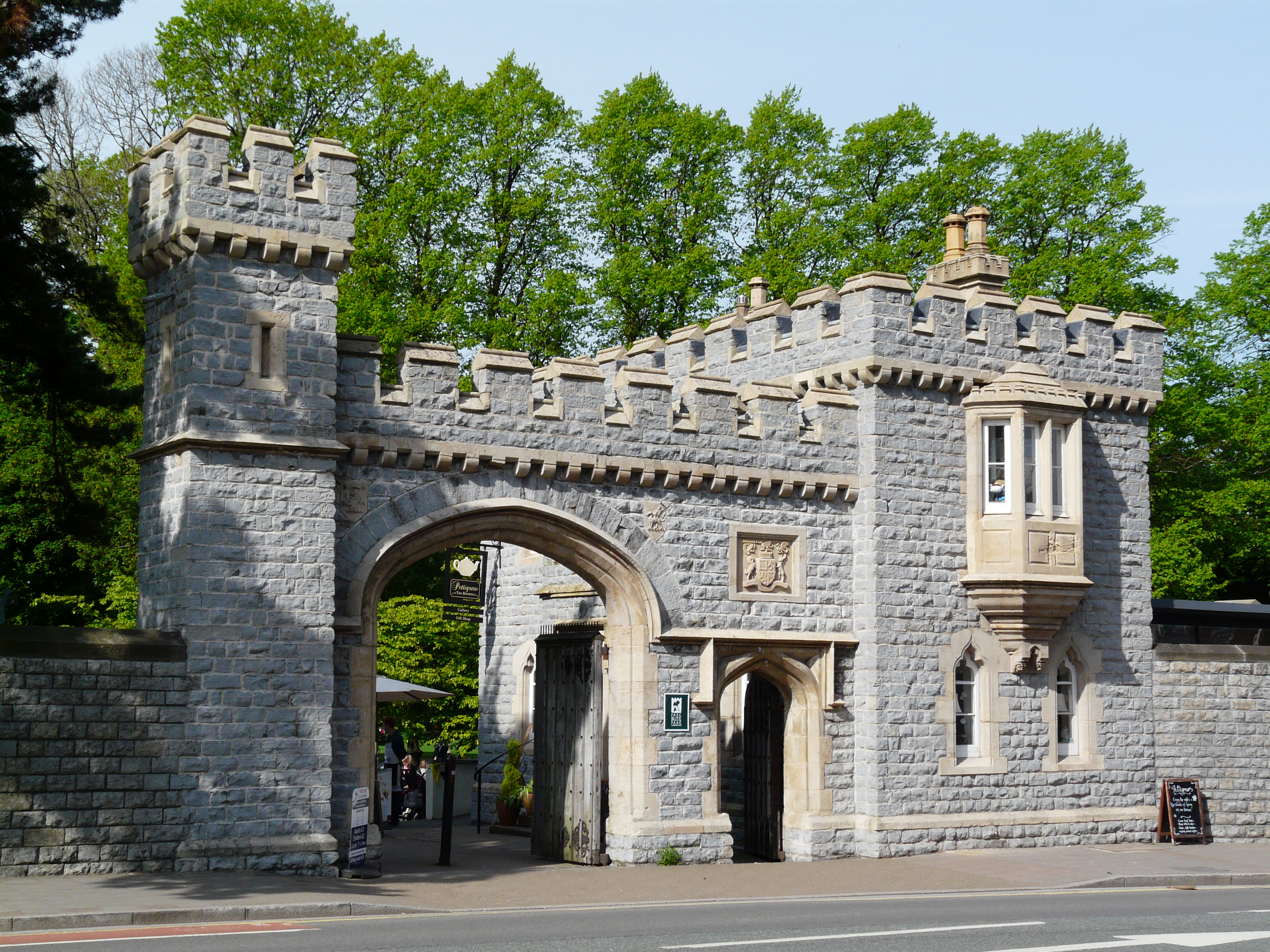
Remains of the West Gate were incorporated into the Grade II* listed West Lodge Gate which is the southern entrance to Bute Park.

The only remaining example of a Cardiff town gate is the reconstructed West Gate attached to Cardiff Castle reconstructed by the Bute family, which was constructed in 1860, on the approximate site of the old West Gate, this building is now a Grade II* listed building. It was restored in 1921, probably to its original size and dimensions.

Remains of the town wall

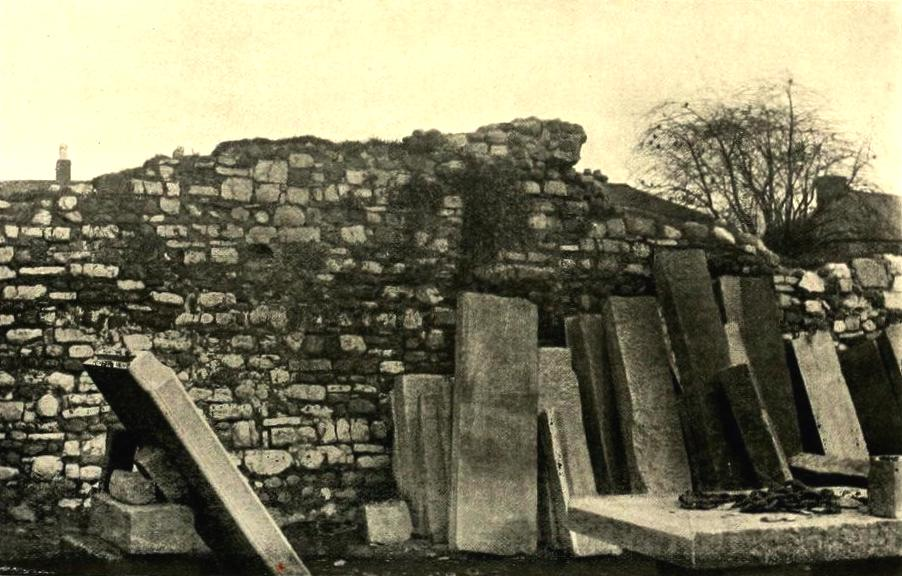
Earlier section east of Working Street in 1890, demolished in 1901 to make way for the Cardiff fish market.

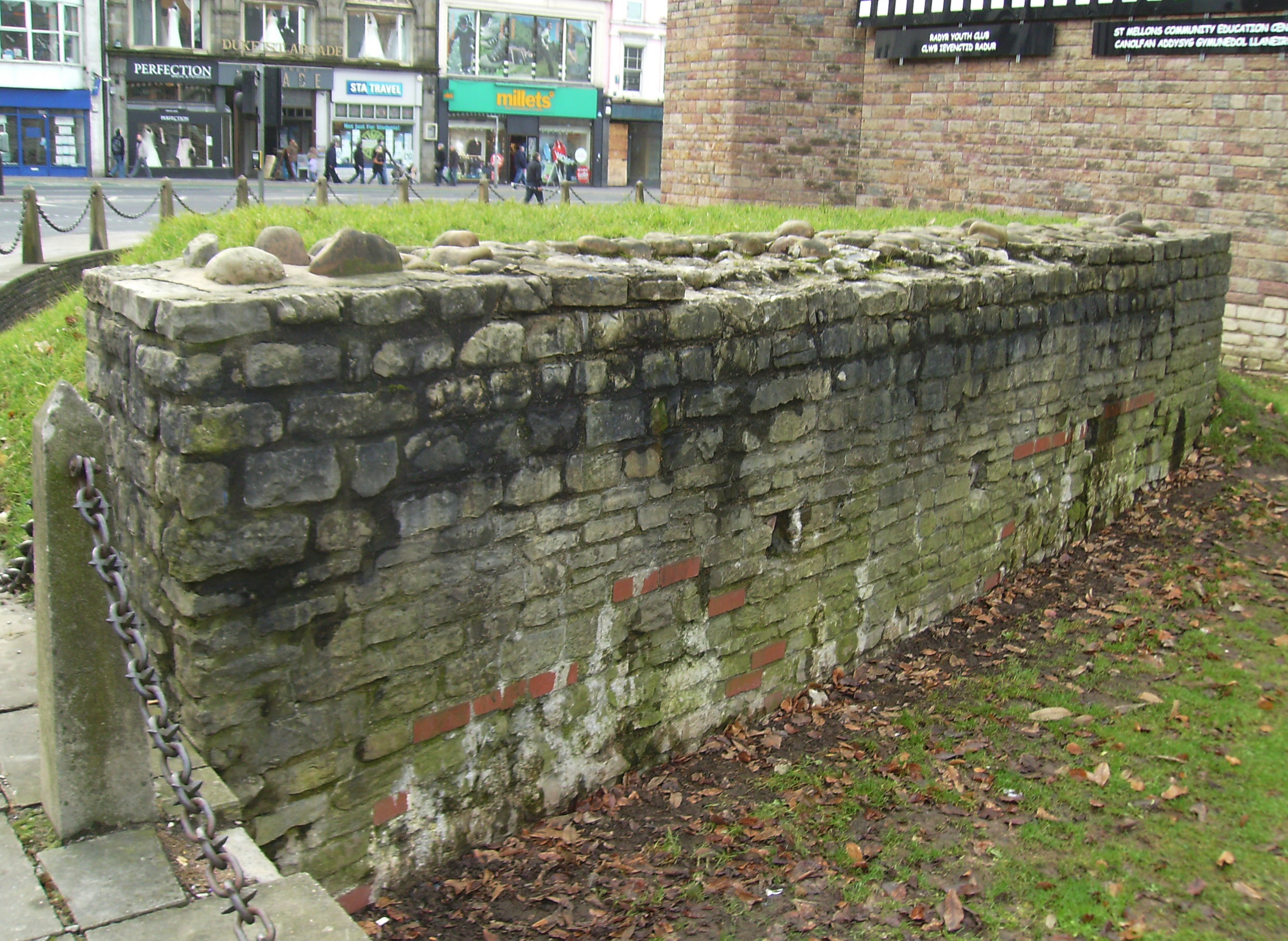
Present-day section supporting a flower bed next to Cardiff Castle, alongside the A470 road.

The largest remaining section of the town wall now stands in an alleyway behind Queen Street, approximately 10 feet (3.0 metres) high, 19 feet (5.8 metres) long with a width of 4 feet (1.2 metres). It previously had a blue plaque attached to it. A blue plaque of the North Gate still remains on the Northgate Building close by. Another smaller section of the wall supports a flower bed next to Cardiff Castle.

Cock's Tower, also known as Cokes Towre, and Cox's Tower, was a watchtower which stood on the east wall, on The Hayes. Some remains of it may still be traced. It stood on the bend of a moat, until about 1860, when it was demolished. Cock's Tower was situated on the site of St Davids shopping centre. When Oxford Arcade was demolished to make way for St Davids shopping centre, archaeologists tried to find remains of the town wall, as well as Cock's Tower, which was a medieval watchpost and dungeon until around the 16th century. Cock's Tower was demolished about 1860 and its foundations were destroyed in 1962.

Other connections with the town wall that still exist include the thoroughfares Westgate Street and Golate, plus the thoroughfare in St Davids shopping centre called the Town Wall and the Northgate Building, close to the original North Gate. St Davids shopping centre had been built on a boundary of the town wall. So when Oxford Arcade was demolished to make way for St Davids shopping centre, archaeologists tried to find remains of the town wall, as well as Cock's Tower, which was a medieval watchpost and dungeon until around the 16th century.

== See also ==
- List of town walls in England and Wales
- Timeline of Cardiff history
- History of Cardiff
