= Rhys Meurug =

Rhys Meurug (Anglicised: Rice Merrick) (died 1586), was a Welsh genealogist, historian and landed gentleman.

== Personal life ==
Rhys lived in St. Nicholas parish in the Vale of Glamorgan. He is descended from the line of Caradog Freichfras, a supposed knight of the Round Table. Meurug served as Clerk of the Peace in Glamorgan, having been appointed by the earl of Pembroke. He is buried in Cowbridge church.

== Literary works ==
Meurug wrote a book on the history of Glamorgan, entitled A Booke of Glamorganshire Antiquities, completed in 1578. Though the original volume was lost in the Hafod library fire in 1807, a copy made in the late 17th century can be found in the Queen's college, Oxford library, and a second copy is in the Cardiff public library. The book is written in English and concerns three areas: Glamorgan region's characteristics, division of the country by Norman knights and the original Welsh families, and Meurug's modern-day Glamorgan. However, a final missing manuscript is insinuated from citations within the two extant manuscripts, and only a portion of the description of Meurug's Glamorgan is available. This third part may be more substantially preserved in Edward Llwyd's manuscripts, written by Meurug c. 1584, though this is not certain. This section discusses rivers, houses of the landed gentry, parishes and the lands.

== Notable connections ==
Meurug collaborated with the historian Sir Edward Stradling while writing his book. He is also known to Dafydd Benwyn and Sils ap Sion, who both sang elegies to Rhys Meurug.
