= Llwynda-Ddu Camp =

Iron age earthwork in Cardiff, Wales

Coordinates: 51.521°N 3.286°W

Llwynda-Ddu Camp, also known as Llwynda-Ddu Hillfort, is a small Iron Age earthwork in Pentyrch, Cardiff in South Wales. The site is a scheduled monument, described as a prehistoric, defensive hillfort.

The plan of the camp is egg-shaped and lies at the western end of a small hill at a height of approximately 120 metres (390 ft). The ground falls away sharply on all sides except the eastern end. The entrance is at the smaller south-western end.

The camp probably comprised two ramparts with ditches but much of the outer ring has been destroyed. The entrance is a straight causeway which interrupts the inner and outer rings. The height of the bank is approximately 2.5 metres (8 ft) higher than the ditch bottom. The inner area measures 85 metres (279 ft) by 60 metres (200 ft) giving an area of 0.4 hectares (1 acre).

The site has been cultivated, with a modern dwelling nearby. It is suggested that the camp belonged to the Silures.
