= Womanby Street =

Street in Cardiff, Wales, United Kingdom

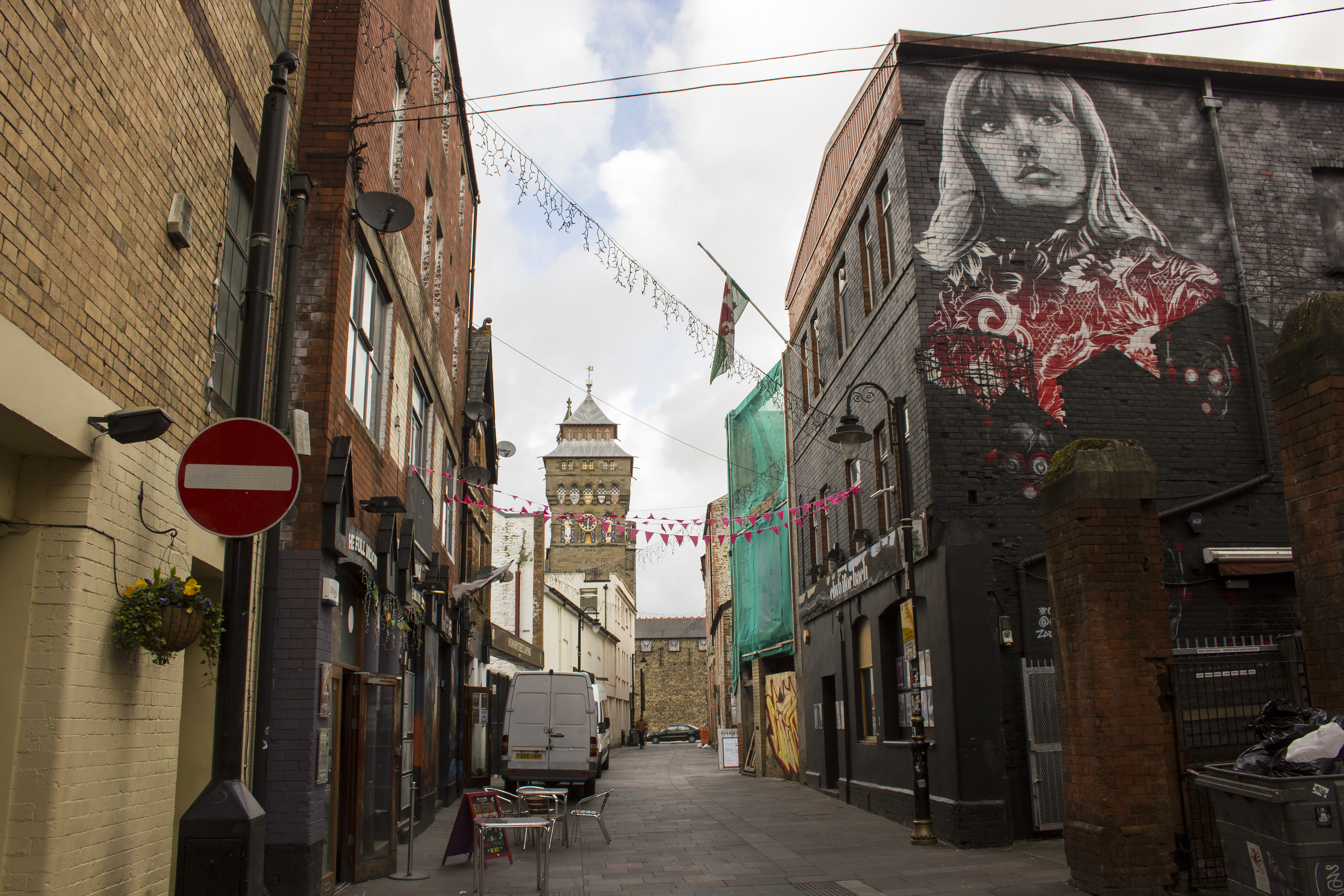
- View of Womanby Street (facing north) with a mural of Gwenno painted on the side of Clwb Ifor Bach
- Interactive map of Womanby Street
- Former name(s): 1310: Houndemammeby; 1550: Hunmanby; 1715: Home & by 1731: Homandby
- Length: 300 m (980 ft)
- Location: Cardiff, Wales, United Kingdom
- Coordinates: 51°28′49.66″N 3°10′53.58″W
- North: Castle Street
- East: St. Mary's Street
- South: Quay Street
- West: Westgate Street

Womanby Street is one of the oldest streets in Cardiff, the capital of Wales. Tracing its name back to origins within the Norse language, its original purpose was to link Cardiff Castle to its quay. In this way it became a trade hub and settling point for those incomers who made the city their home. Throughout its history the street has had several pubs, and today has several bars and clubs.

== Name ==
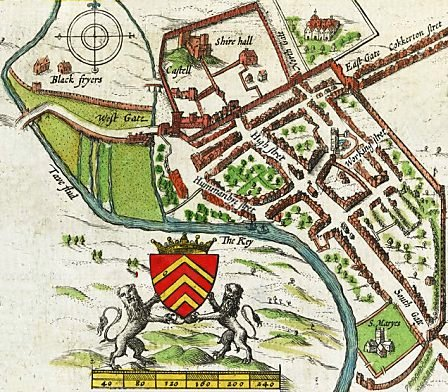
John Speed's 1610 map of Cardiff, showing Houndemammeby Street

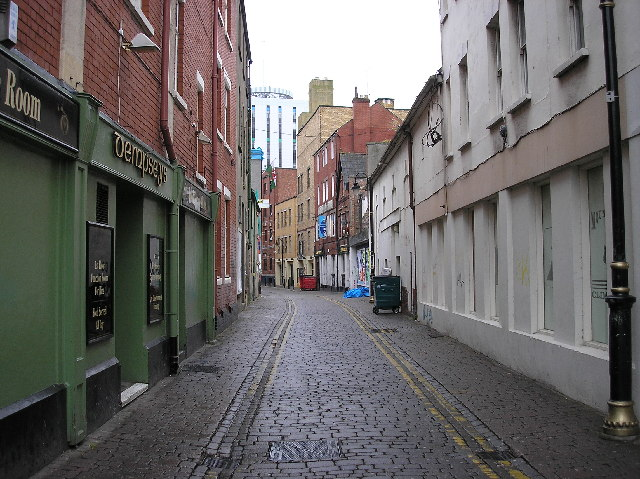
Womanby Street in 2005

Originally, before the River Taff was diverted, the street ran north from the town's quay where the modern Westgate Street is sited, towards Cardiff Castle.

After Richard Fitz Gilbert de Clare, Duke of Gloucester, rebuilt Cardiff Castle from wood to stone in the 12th century, the medieval town began to spread out from the castle's rebuilt South Gate. The first stage was between Working Street in the east, Quay Street in the south and what was then known as Houndemammeby Street to the west. To the far west, the town was protected by the River Taff, with tents pitched on the land between.

All of these street names originated in the Norse language, with Houndemammeby translating as "the home or dwelling of the hound man or keeper of hounds", or simply "huntsman's dwelling". Although there is no direct evidence of a Viking presence in Cardiff, the street's names suggest that the Danes could have reached the port town. The name then changed regularly through the next few hundreds of years:

- 1550: Hunmanby
- 1715: Home & by
- 1731: Homandby

The word Womanby is early Teutonic language in origins, and translates as "the abode of the foreigners". It was hence probably used to signify the strangers quarters, where the native Welsh and resident non Anglo-Normans were permitted to live together under the shadow of the mediaeval castle.

== History ==
=== New Trinity chapel ===
In 1638 William Ebery, the Vicar of St Mary's Church, Cardiff, and senior members of his congregation were barred from the premises after they refused to read the Book of Sports. These people together with others of a similar mind formed the core of a congregation, that after the English Civil War and subsequent Restoration, in 1696 were granted land in Womanby Street by Alderman John Archer. This allowed them to build the first Trinity Church, later known as a Presbyterian chapel.

In 1718, the church was endowed with a nearby dwelling house in Castle Street. After a fire gutted the building, the church was rebuilt and reopened in 1847. In 1888, Trinity Church amalgamated with Llandaff Road English Congregational Church, and sold the church in Womanby Street, funding the construction of the current New Trinity English Independent chapel in Cowbridge Road East, Canton.

=== Jones Court ===
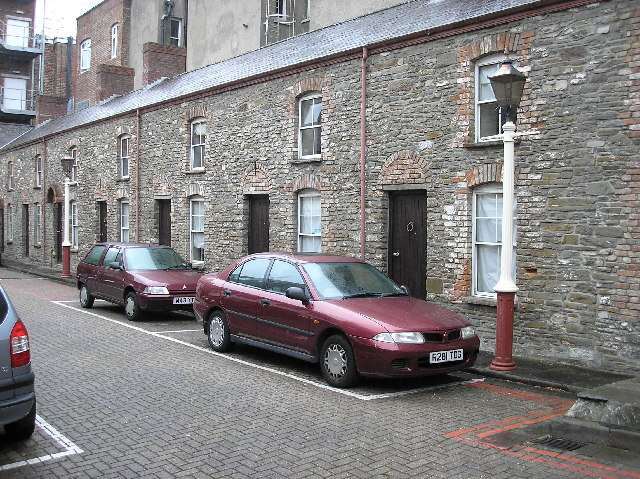
The restored Jones Court

Jones Court (51°28′46.88″N 3°10′55.88″W), which leads off of Womanby Street, was built in 1830 by the Marquis of Bute to house labourers imported for the expansion of Cardiff Docks. Each of the 50 houses had just two rooms, and with no water supply or drainage, the occupants fared poorly in the cholera outbreak in the city in 1849. Cardiff Council acquired Jones Court from the Marquis in the early 1900s, and used it as council offices until post-World War II. In a dilapidated state by 1980, and housing only the cities Weights & Measures office, it was fully restored and reopened by the Lord Mayor in February 1982. During the restoration, it was found that the land had long been used as the city's rubbish dump for the properties on the High Street, again confirming the low social stance of the area. Jones Court is the last remaining example of the over 50 19th-century housing courts that had existed in Cardiff.

== Trade and entertainment ==
The street has always been a home to many businesses, not least those associated with ale, beer and entertainment.

In 1759, an affray took place in the street between the crews of the trader The Eagle of Bristol and the man-of-war Aldbrough. With all participants armed with either swords, pistols, cutlasses, pikes or muskets, they fought between themselves until Edmund Ffaharty lay dead, and many others were wounded. Investigated by the sheriff's men, they passed the case to the coroner's court with the brief to hush the whole affair up. Thus, the court ruled that Ffaharty had been shot by a "person unknown", and that no further investigation was required.

Charles Evans, writing to the Evening Express in 1901, said:

We will, figuratively speaking, come out of the Globe and enter Womanby Street. The first pub we see, The Horse and Groom has changed its face but not its name; the next house used to be a very noted hostelry, called the Red Cow. It was, a few years ago, greatly enlarged, going back to what is now Westgate Street, its name is altered to the more pretentious one of The Grand. A little lower down the street or lane – Red Cow lane, it was often called in those days – used to be an important and well known Cardiff Boat hostelry kept by my grandfather, Mr David Evans, who was head constable of the town, as his tombstone, now lying at the foot of the Cross in St John's Churchyard, Cardiff, will testify.

=== Cardiff Boat ===
The Cardiff Boat was a seaman's hostelry, that would welcome all sailors who made it past Tiger Bay and into the centre of the city.

=== Horse and Groom ===
One of the earliest pubs in Cardiff, and also one of the smallest, the Horse and Groom was said to be haunted by a poltergeist. A very traditional pub until a make-over in the last decade to match the more trendy hostelrys on St. Mary's Street, it was originally adorned with years-old pictures of the regulars behind the bar, and in 1967 there still existed an open brass gas pipe for lighting one's choice of smoking implement.

In 2013, the site of the Horse & Groom became the home of Fuel Rock Club, A rock bar and grassroots live music venue.

=== Red Cow ===
The site of the Red Cow pub, which was on the western side of the street opposite Clwb Ifor Bach until the early 2000s, became its sister establishment the Y Fuwch Goch public house (English The Red Cow). In 2011 it was the site of live music venue The Full Moon, which went into liquidation in April 2017. Three weeks later, former staff organised a fundraiser to rescue the space and opened The Moon, a grassroots live music venue and club. The Moon announced its closure in November 2024 when the holding company, The Creative Republic of Cardiff, went into liquidation.

=== Clwb Ifor Bach ===
In 1983, Clwb Ifor Bach (known in English as "The Welsh Club"), started on Womanby Street, to promote the Welsh language in Cardiff by engaging Welsh-medium youth entertainment. It has since proved a successful launchpad for various Welsh-medium groups, including Super Furry Animals, Gorky's Zygotic Mynci and Catatonia.

== Modern street ==
In 2011, as part of Cardiff Council's redevelopment and pedestrianisation of St. Mary's Street, known as the Castle Quarter, Womanby Street and Quay Street were included in the scheme and given refurbishment.

Started in February 2010, Castle Quarter, in keeping with the nearby Cardiff Castle, was designed on a Victorian architecture theme, including Victorian-style street lighting and commemorative seating. Work commenced on Womanby Street and Quay Street in February 2011. The street was repaved and pedestrianised, with access permitted solely for delivery vehicles from the North (Castle Street) and permit holders from the South (Quay Street). Works were completed in Spring 2011.

In the mid-2010s the Womanby Street became the venue for a number of 'popup' markets, where temporary restaurants and stalls were hosted in the street's bars and clubs. In November 2014 the Oxjam Takeover music festival took place in the street's bars and clubs, involving 45 bands with proceeds going to the Oxfam charity.

== Appearances in the media ==
Due to its age and enclosed nature, Womanby Street has appeared in a few media productions.

It first appeared in a television serial adaptation of Jack Jones's novel series Off to Philadelphia in the Morning (1978), starring Connie Booth.

In the 2000s, it appeared in the revival of BBC1's Doctor Who (episodes: "The Empty Child", "The Age of Steel"), its adult-themed spin-off Torchwood, with the second episode of its third series, Children of Earth and the children's spin-off series The Sarah Jane Adventures (episode: "Warriors of Kudlak").

== See also ==
- Cardiff city centre
- History of Cardiff
