= Cardiff Roman Fort =

Former Roman castle in Wales

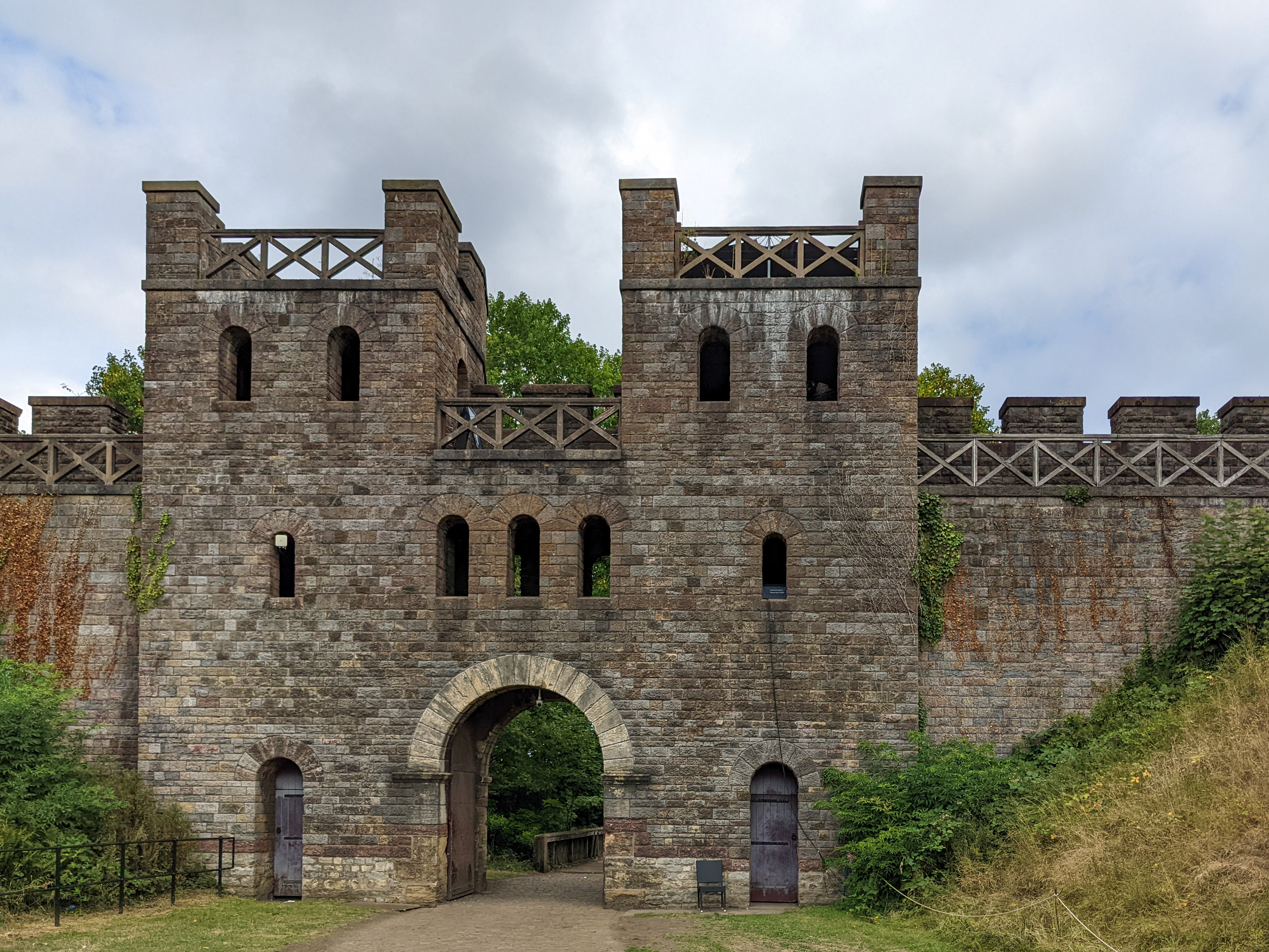
- Reconstructed Roman gateway to Cardiff castle

- Location within Cardiff
- 51.4822°N 3.1814°W
- Location: Cardiff, Wales

Cardiff Roman Fort was a coastal fort in the Roman province of Britannia Superior, of which Roman Wales was a part. Its original Latin name is uncertain. Its remains are incorporated into Cardiff Castle in the modern capital city of Wales.

== Name ==
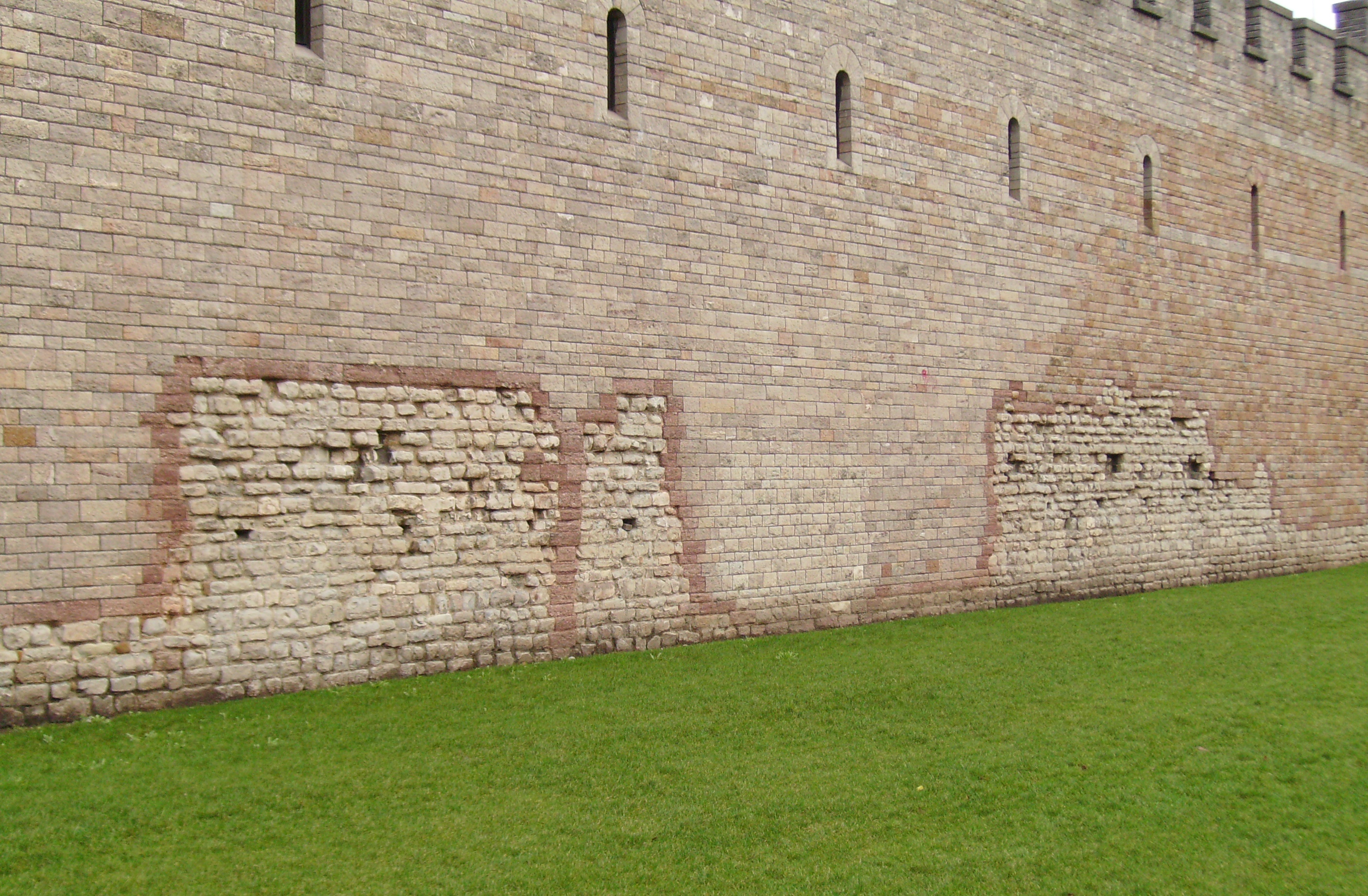
Cardiff Castle. The stones below the bed bricks are the original Roman fort

The fort's name is uncertain. It could have been Tamium as appears in the Ravenna Cosmography, although this may have been a river name and thus refers to the River Taff. Alternatively it may be Bovium (corrected from Bomio) of the Antonine Itinerary.

== Early forts ==
Prior to the building of the extant fort, there were at least two previous Roman forts on the site. The first was probably a vexillation camp built during attempted conquest of the Silures tribe around AD 55. About twenty years later, after a period of abandonment, a new smaller Roman auxiliary fort was constructed and was possibly occupied, along with a civilian vicus, until the reign of the Emperor Hadrian. From the late 2nd to the mid-3rd century, civilian timber buildings associated with iron working occupied the site.

== Carausian shore fort ==
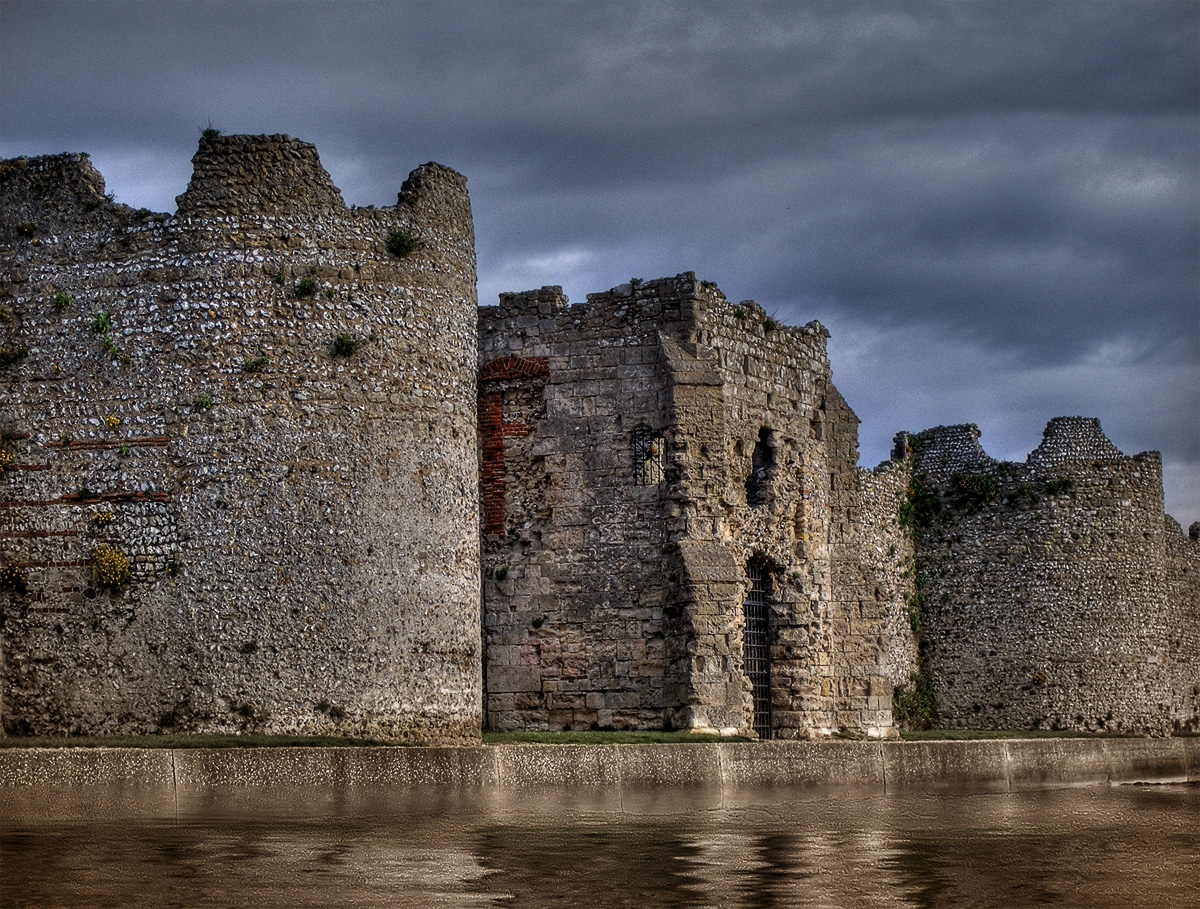
Portchester (Portus Adurni) is the best preserved Roman fort north of the Alps. The D-shaped towers are typical of 3rd-century of Roman forts.

Around 290, a 9-acre (3.57 hectare) shore fort was built on the site, not unlike the almost complete example at Portchester in Hampshire. Its walls were ten feet thick and it was positioned to control access to the upper reaches of the River Severn. There may have been associated watch towers on the now eroded cliffs to the west. This is believed to have been the Emperor Carausius' response to increased Irish raids. Its military/naval force eventually moved elsewhere about 370.

== Post-Roman legends ==
The ruinous fort appears as the residence of 'King Ynwyl' in the story of Geraint and Enid, a medieval romance associated with the Mabinogion. Geraint was possibly a late 5th-century King of Dumnonia.
