= Caradoc of Llancarfan =

12th-century Welsh cleric and biographer

Caradoc of Llancarfan (Welsh: Caradog o Lancarfan) was a Welsh cleric and author associated with Llancarfan in Wales in the 12th century. He is generally seen as the author of a Life of Gildas and a Life of Saint Cadog, in Latin.

== Dates and ascriptions ==
Caradoc was a contemporary of Geoffrey of Monmouth, author of the Historia Regum Britanniae, at the end of which he refers to Caradoc as writing a continuation to cover the period from 689 to his own time. This must be the chronicle Brut y Tywysogion, although no extant medieval copy mentions Caradoc as its author.

The date of the Life of Gildas is estimated at 1130–1150. Its author shows familiarity with the abbey at Glastonbury, which has been taken as suggesting that he may have relocated there from Llancarfan.

Caradoc's version of the Life of Saint Cadog (Cadog being the founder of the clas at Llancarfan) is included in a manuscript held at the University of Cambridge, along with the Life of Gildas, at the end of which the author identifies himself, in a Latin couplet, as also being the author of the second Life. The life of Cadog includes King Arthur as a major character.

The 16th-century Welsh antiquary David Powel claimed his Historie of Cambria as a continuation of this chronicle. At the end of the 18th century, Iolo Morganwg wrote what he claimed was Caradoc's lost chronicle, Brut Aberpergwm. Published in The Myvyrian Archaiology of Wales, this became one of the most best known of Iolo's numerous literary and antiquarian forgeries, which give the Morgannwg (Glamorgan) a central place in early and medieval Welsh history.

J. S. P. Tatlock, in a 1938 article, throws doubt on the accounts of Caradoc of Llancarfan by T. F. Tout in the original The Dictionary of National Biography, and by Sir John Edward Lloyd in the Dictionary of Welsh Biography, saying that "even the late Professor Tout devotes most of his account... to statements certainly groundless, uses worthless authorities, and ignores or distorts the implications of what is reliably known."

== Bibliography ==
- Stephen, Leslie, ed. (1887). "Caradog of Llancarvan" . Dictionary of National Biography. Vol. 9. London: Smith, Elder & Co.
- Hugh Williams, translator, Two Lives of Gildas by a monk of Ruys and Caradoc of Llancarfan, first published in Cymmrodorion Record Series, 1899. Facsimile reprint by Llanerch Publishers, Felinfach, 1990
