= Cardiff Bay Wetlands Reserve =

Tidal marsh preserve in Wales

Coordinates: 51°27′35.42″N 3°10′12.67″W

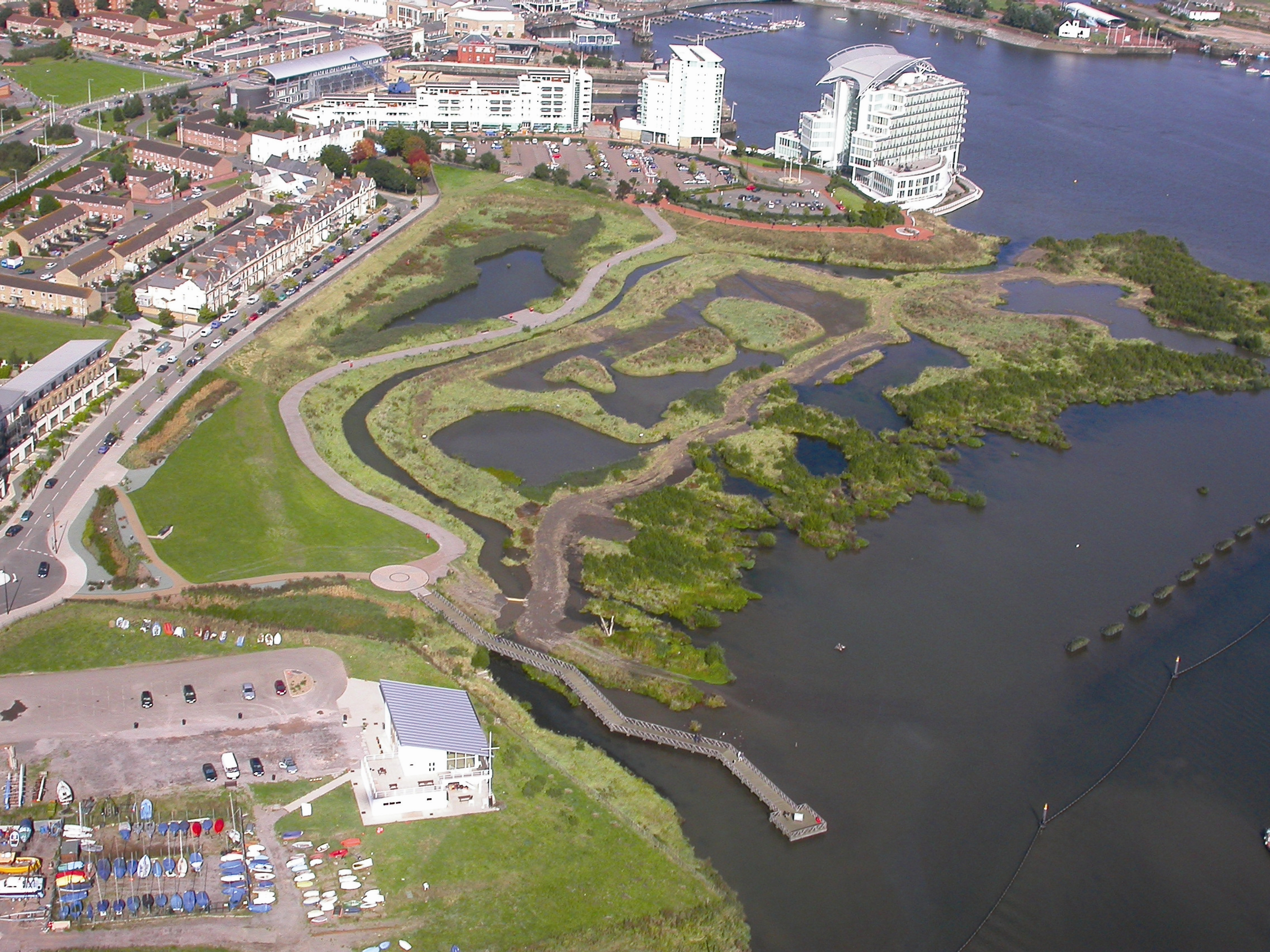
Cardiff Bay Wetlands Reserve

Cardiff Bay Wetlands Reserve is located in Cardiff Bay in the city of Cardiff. It covers an area of approximately 8 hectares (19.8 acres). The area was officially opened as a wildlife reserve on 25 July 2002 in what was previously an area of Site of Special Scientific Interest (SSSI) up until the opening of the Cardiff Bay Barrage in April 2001. The area had previously been salt marsh, but the Barrage created 200 hectares of freshwater lake, and from this the reserve was developed.

== Construction ==
The site was chosen by Cardiff Harbour Authority, which manages Cardiff Bay, to create an important new environment from the previous salt marsh, and to help compensate for the loss of the Cardiff Bay mudflats.

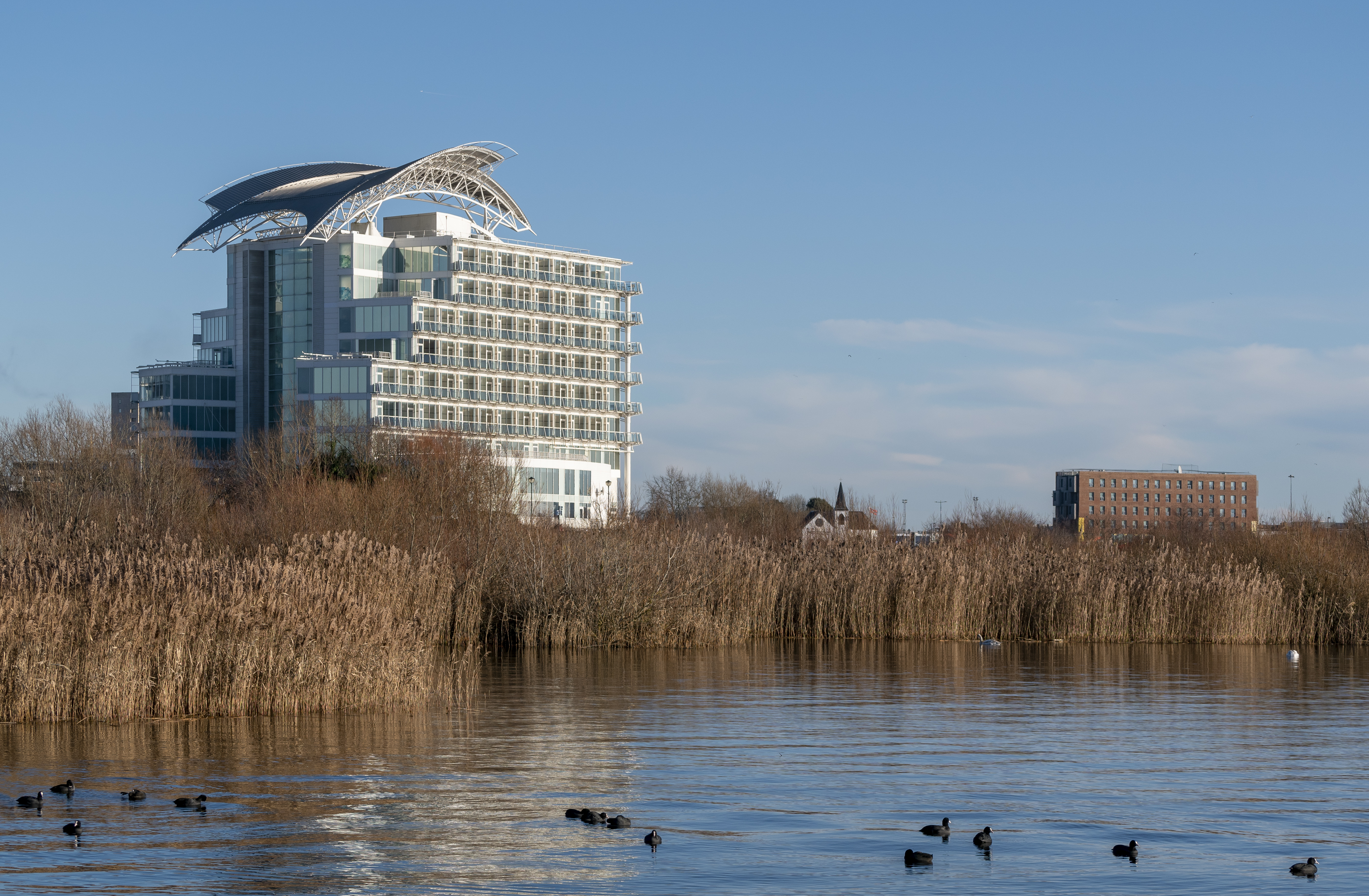
Cardiff Wetlands with St David's Hotel on the left

Edmund Nuttall Ltd. won the GB£120,000 contract to build the Reserve, and work was completed by the end of November 2003. In 2001, a landscape architect, Phil Williams from the Landscape Institute, was appointed. He said:

We were working in a difficult environment, the site was not going to develop a new ecology overnight. We didn't know the extent to which the water level in the bay might fluctuate and therefore affect the new communities of species we are trying to attract. Dealing with this changing situation demanded a cautious approach. The site needed careful monitoring.

After the Wetlands Reserve was constructed, tonnes of debris had flowed down from the River Taff and collected near the reserve, so in 2003 Cardiff Harbour Authority built a 450-metre floating boom to prevent debris from entering the reserve.

== The reserve ==
Wetlands are a transitional habitat between water and land; they provide an important habitat for many bird, fish, animal, and plant species.

The Cardiff Bay Wetlands Reserve can be found near St David's Hotel close to Mermaid Quay.

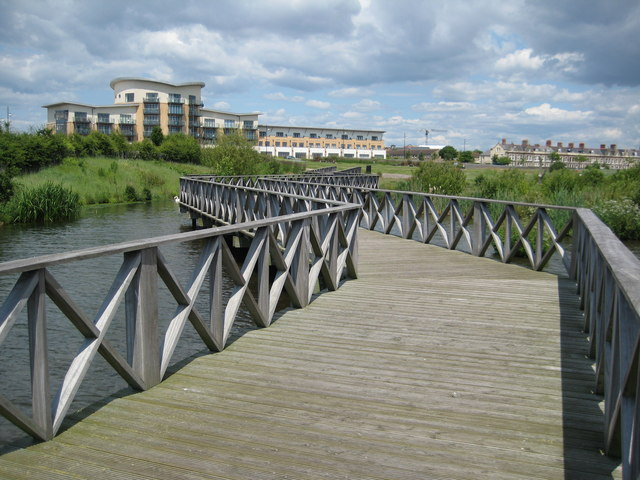
The jetty

Prior to the construction of the Cardiff Bay Barrage, this area was made up of mudflats and salt marsh. The wetlands reserve was created in the new freshwater lake.

The reserve is a biodiversity hot-spot within Cardiff Bay. The reedbed, a UK Biodiversity Action Plan habitat, along with other aquatic plants, are very productive vegetation.

A number of bird species including common reed buntings, reed warblers, and sedge warblers, use this habitat in which to build nests. Reedbed is not only important for birds, but also for invertebrates, fish, and amphibians.

Interesting birds and wildlife can be seen here – not only in the summer, but year-round. The types of birds and their activity level will vary depending on the season. In the spring, when some birds breed on the Reserve, birds can be seen and heard singing – especially early in the morning. The autumn and winter bring visitors like teal and European stonechat.

== The Wetlands food web ==
The various species which inhabit the Cardiff Bay Wetlands exist in a dynamic food web. Very small creatures such as midge larvae and worms live in the mud underneath the wetlands. These are eaten by several bird species such as common snipe. Other insects also use this transition zone between water and land to spend various phases of their lives – dragonflies live in the aquatic zone as larvae and adults. Sometimes black-tailed skimmers can be observed hunting their territories in the reen part of the reserve.

The relationship between plants and animals – birds or insects, can be surprising. Cinnabar moths feed on ragwort whilst in their caterpillar phase.

Fish are also visible in the shallow areas of the Reserve. A number of coarse fish species benefit from the warm water and abundance of submerged aquatic vegetation which exists almost exclusively in this part of the Bay. The water provides excellent nursery conditions, cover, and food for small fish.

Some species of bird spend a lot of time in the reserve because they can feed on fish there. Grey herons and common kingfishers are often seen on the reserve.

== Access ==
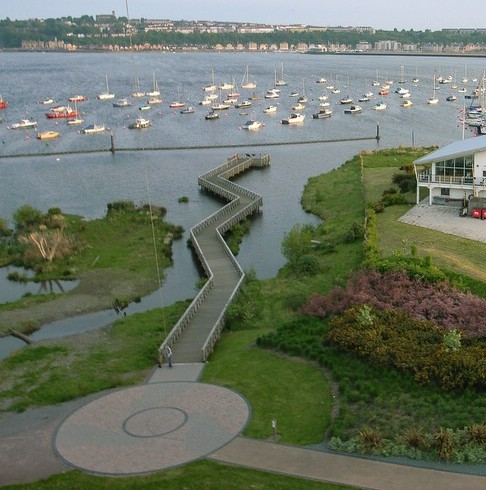
The board walk over the Reserve

A footpath crosses the reserve from St. David’s Hotel to the Yacht Club on the River Taff. At the end of this footpath, a boardwalk goes out into the water, allowing good viewing across the Reserve, and also provides a good spot for watching the fish shoaling in the shallow waters.

Although public access is not permitted onto the main body of the reserve, this is to allow excellent breeding and feeding conditions to develop for the species present. It is possible to view many bird species from the public area with the naked eye, and binoculars will allow an even better birding experience.

Also visible is a floating boom that surrounds the reserve. Under conditions of high river flows on the Rivers Taff and Ely, water-borne debris can be washed down into Cardiff Bay from the upstream catchments. This boom prevents this debris from entering the reserve, and impacting upon the species that are found there.

== See also ==
- Newport Wetlands Reserve
