= Cardiff Bay Visitor Centre (1991–2010) =

Former architectural structure in Wales

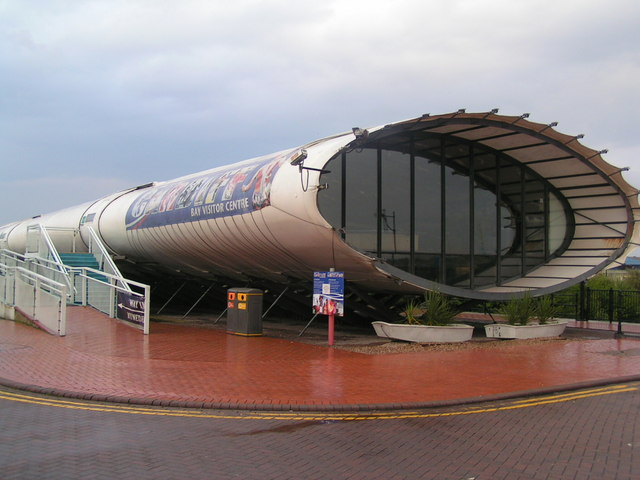
- The Tube in 2008
- Alternative names: The Tube

General information
- Status: Dismantled
- Location: Cardiff Bay, Cardiff, Wales
- Completed: 1991
- Demolished: 2010
- Client: CBDC

Design and construction
- Architecture firm: Alsop, Lyall & Stormer
- Awards: RIBA Regional Award (1991); RIBA National Award (1992)

Cardiff Bay Visitor Centre (known informally as "the Tube") was a piece of modern architecture designed by the architect Will Alsop for Cardiff Bay, Wales, in 1990. It was finally dismantled in 2010. A panel of architectural experts has said the building "single-handedly put Cardiff on the architectural map".

== Design and construction ==
Architect Will Alsop was already involved in the development of the Cardiff Bay Barrage when asked, by the Cardiff Bay Development Corporation (CBDC), to design a visitors' centre. The building was completed during the Summer of 1990, located close to the Victorian Pierhead Building. It cost somewhere between £350,000 and £500,000 and was originally expected to last for only two years, the duration of its first temporary planning consent.

The building was in the shape of a long flattened tube, glazed at each end. Alsop liked to compare its shape to a disposable cigarette lighter. It was constructed using a series of oval steel ribs, clad with marine plywood and covered with external skin of nylon-pvc fabric. It was one of the first significant projects completed by Neil Thomas's structural engineering consultancy, Atelier 1.

Ripple-like slots were cut into the plywood, allowing dappled daylight into the interior. It was shortlisted for the Royal Institute of British Architects (RIBA) Building of the Year award (forerunner of the Stirling Prize).

The visitor centre was built to house an exhibition about the new Cardiff Bay development. In 1993 the building needed to be moved from its location east of the Pierhead Building. Rather than permanently dismantle it, the structure was put on the back of a 50m long Mammoet self-propelled transporter and moved to another part of the Bay. At the same time a new entrance ramp was added on the north side and steel brackets fixed to the end ribs to allow the pvc-nylon sheath to be fully stressed along the building's length. It continued to house interactive exhibitions and a scale model of Cardiff.

Because of its distinctive shape, the visitor centre became known locally as 'The Tube'. In 2009 it was listed ninth in the Top Ten free attractions in Wales.

Cardiff Bay Visitor Centre was listed by a panel of experts as one of the Top 50 Buildings of the 1990s, saying the building had "single-handedly put Cardiff on the architectural map".

== Later events ==
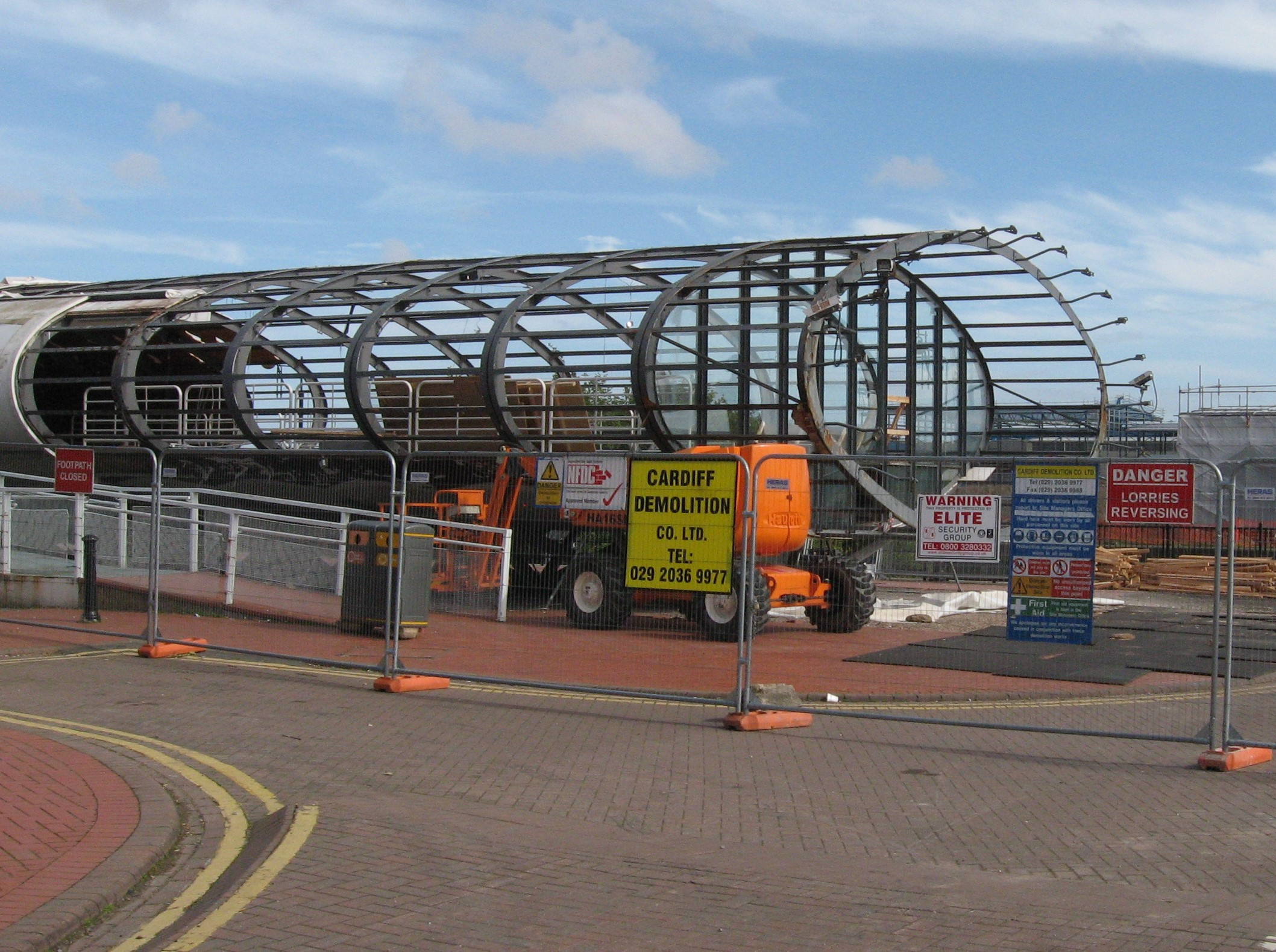
The Tube during demolition in September 2011

In 2006 the building's operators, Cardiff Initiative, ceased trading and The Tube closed for several weeks, reopening under the management of Cardiff Council.

The Tube was finally dismantled (and put into storage) in Autumn 2010 to make way for a new link road. "I'm surprised it's lasted this long," said Alsop's practice partner John Lyall.

== Awards ==
- 1991 – Royal Institute of British Architects (RIBA) Regional Award for Architecture.
- 1992 – RIBA National Award for Architecture.
