= Cardiff International White Water =

White water sports venue in Cardiff, Wales

- Dŵr Gwyn Rhyngwladol Caerdydd

About
- Locale: Cardiff Bay, Cardiff
- Coordinates: 51.448°N 3.183°W
- Road access: A4232 and A4050
- Managing agent: Cardiff Harbour Authority
- Main shape: Loop
- Adjustable: Yes
- Water source: River Ely
- Pumped: Yes
- Practice pool: Yes
- Surf wave: Yes
- Construction: 2008-2010
- Opening date: 26 March 2010

Stats
- Loops: 1 ½
- Length: 258 metres (846 ft)
- Drop: 3.9 metres (13 ft)
- Slope: 1.5% (80 ft/mi)
- Flowrate: Slalom: 10 m^{3}/s (350 cu ft/s) Recreation: 4–10 m^{3}/s (140–350 cu ft/s)

Cardiff International White Water (Welsh: Dŵr Gwyn Rhyngwladol Caerdydd) is an Olympic standard white water rafting centre based at the Cardiff International Sports Village in Cardiff Bay.

The centre opened on 26 March 2010, after taking two years to build the £13.3m venue, which is the first on-demand white water centre in the UK. The facility was designed by the French company, HydroStadium, who designed similar courses for the Sydney, Athens and Beijing Olympics

The centre offers on-demand white water rafting and canoeing and a flat-water pond for warm-up and initial training. Off-site activities include gorge walking and surfing.

== History ==
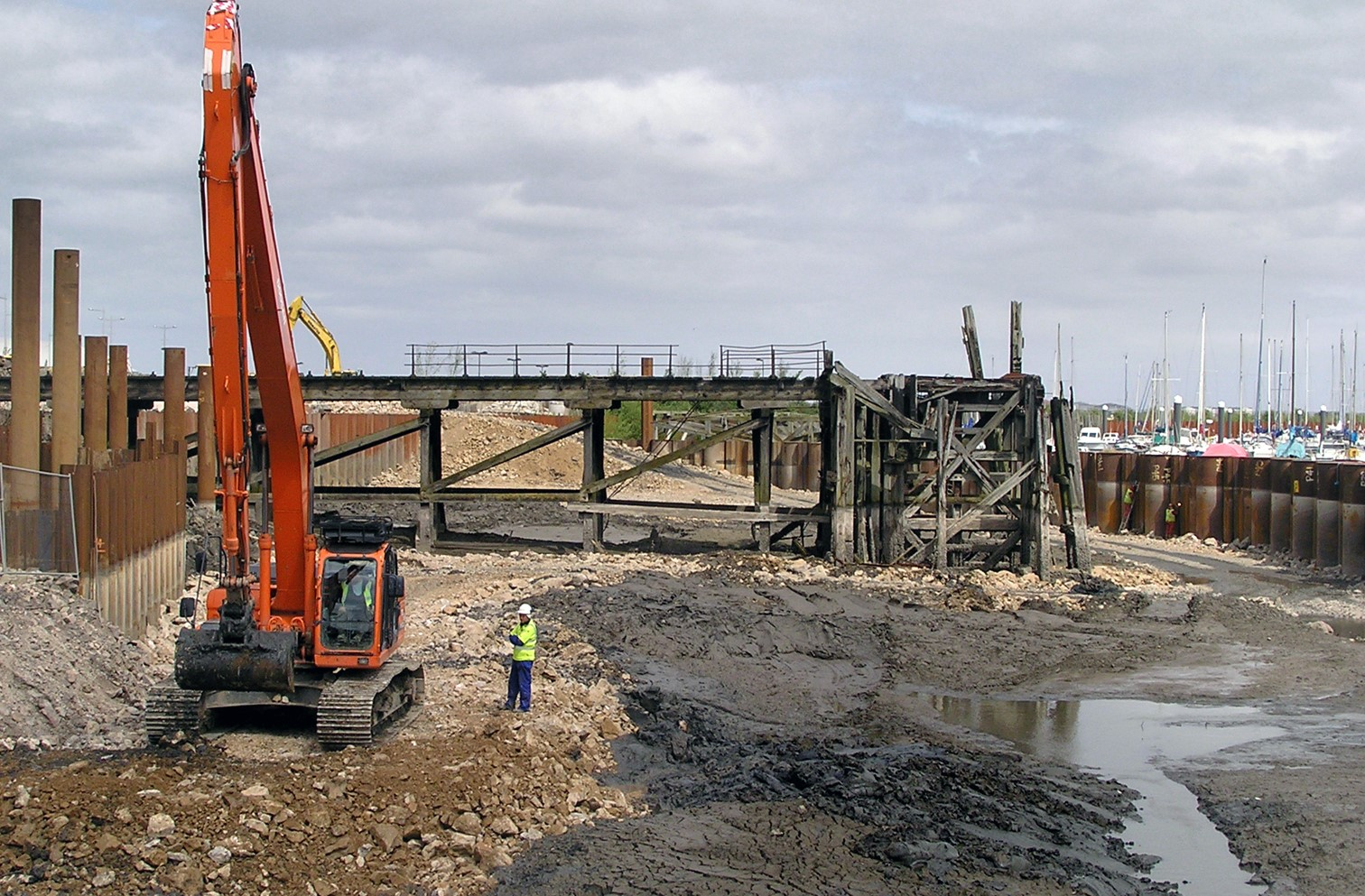
During construction of the Cardiff International White Water

Prior to the 1999 completion of the Cardiff Bay Barrage, Cardiff Bay and the tidewater sections of the Rivers Ely and Taff were a saltwater estuary which filled and emptied twice daily with tides as high as 12 metres (39 ft). At low tide, moored boats were stranded on mud flats. The barrage converted the estuary into a permanent freshwater lake, maintained at the level of the former high tide. The shoreline of this new lake is the location of the CIWW.

Plans for the CIWW were revealed and approved in 2006 and the centre was originally due to open in 2008, with an original estimated cost of £8.4m and funding support from the Welsh Assembly Government, Sportlot, the Welsh Canoe Association and the Heritage Lottery fund.

In November 2008, a 180-tonne crane was constructed on the site in order to start work on a temporary dam that held back the water while four large pumps were installed. The crane was then floated on a pontoon in the River Ely to create a retained water pool separating the course from the river.

An estimated 50,000 people are expected to use it each year.

== Canoe Slalom Competition ==
The gates used on 10 June for the final race of the first event of the 2012 ICF Canoe Slalom World Cup.

The CIWW centre was developed by Cardiff Council for full international and Olympic competition use. The first event of the International Canoe Federation's 2012 World Cup, held on 8 June through 10 June, was used by several nations to finalize their selection of athletes for the 2012 London Olympics. The 23-gate course for the final race on 10 June had seven upstream gates, six downstream gates in eddies, and an unusual set of three flush gates forming a zig-zag chicane. Downstream gates 13, 14, and 15 had all six of their poles in a straight line, evenly spaced, with the racers required to start from the left and pass each pole on alternating sides.

== Activities ==
The CIWW centre is situated near the Rivers Taff, Ely and the Welsh coastline. It offers on and off-site:

- Gorge scrambling
- Surfing
- Canoeing and Kayaking
- Bushcraft
- Rock climbing
- Mountain Biking
- Team building challenges and courses
- Stag and hen activities
- Birthday party activities

=== White water rafting ===
The Cardiff International White Water centre is the first on-demand white water rafting facility in the UK. The 250 metre hairpin-shaped course can hold up to 16 cubic metres of water per second when being used for full international competitions but for recreational use it will generally hold only 10 cubic metres.

In addition to the standard 2 hour white water rafting sessions, CIWW also has a Hydro Speed ride, similar to a body board which is ridden on a water float at "hydrospeed". Additionally, one or two person inflatable kayaking, known as hot-dogging, is guided initially by CIWW instructors until allowing the rider to go solo.

The course is also open to free kayakers with their own equipment.

== Training and instruction ==
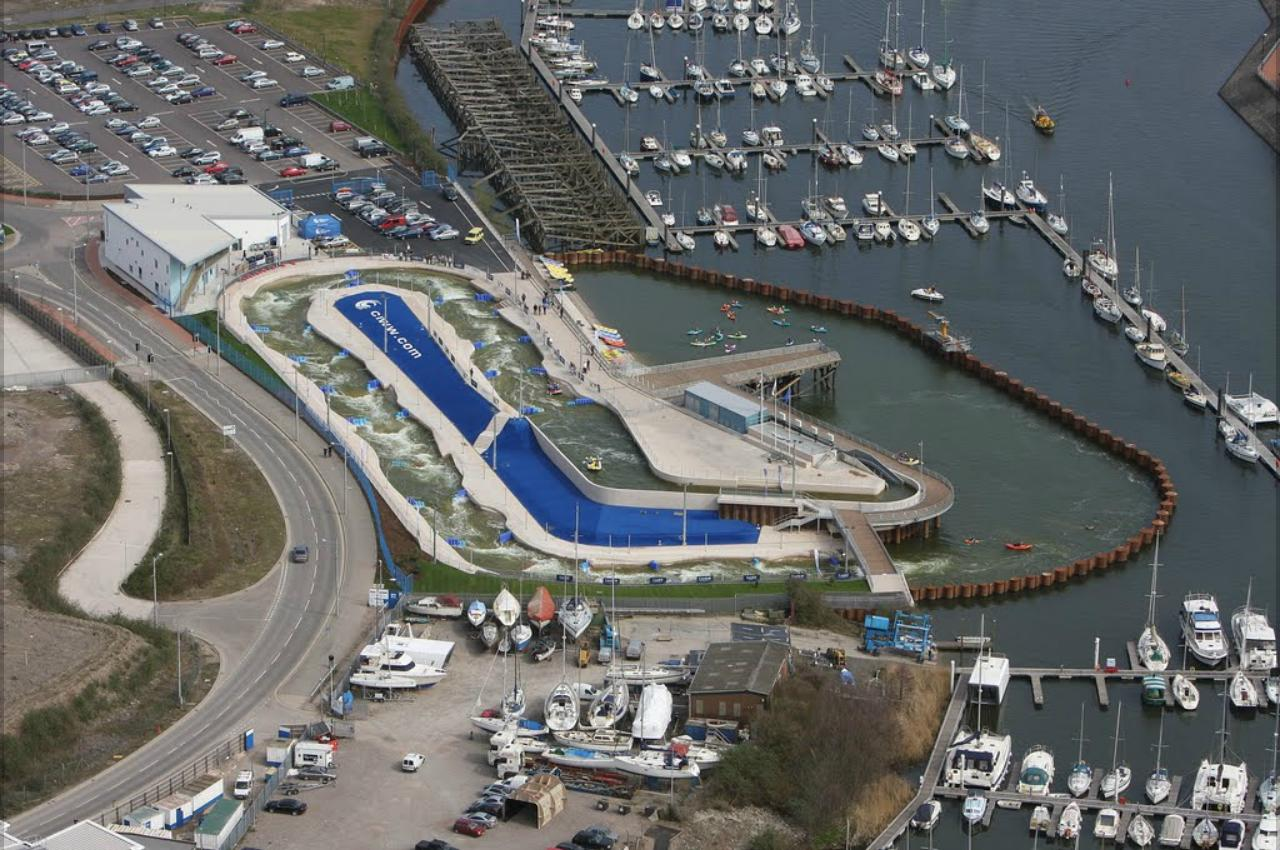
Aerial view of the artificial river and pond

CIWW is recognised as a centre of excellence by several bodies including Canoe Wales and the BCU. The centre is used as a training venue by Europe's rescue services. CIWW provides educational canoe and kayak courses, from an introductory level to leadership and coaching awards.

The Paddle School is aimed at beginners of the sport for the first time, offering 'try it' days and development towards British Canoe Union (BCU) awards. The school is a National Training Centre and is able to undertake on and offsite courses using local rivers or the centre at CIWW. Training and instruction is offered in BCU Star, Safety, Coaching, Moderate Water Endorsement, and Paddlepower Awards.

The National Raft Guide School provides raft guide training and assessment. The teaching staff has experience in training and assessment to British Canoe Union raft guide standard, obtained at locations in the UK, Europe, Africa and New Zealand. The National Raft Guide School runs an annual programme of guide training, BCU Level 1 and 2 courses at the CIWW centre.

The centre can offer activities to schools and colleges as part of the GCSE, A Level and BTEC curriculum, or as part of the Duke of Edinburgh Award.

== Other facilities ==
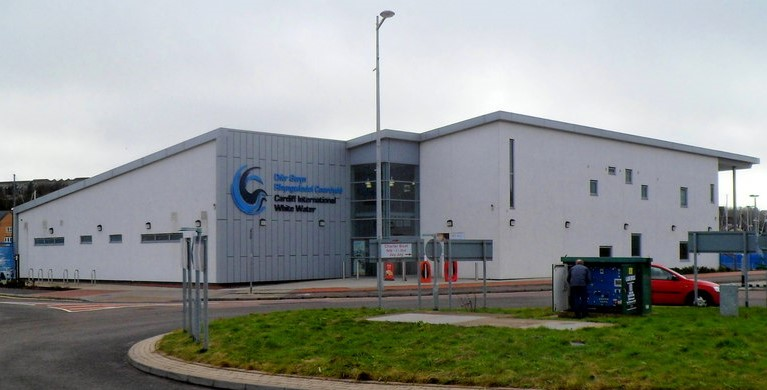
The entrance to the Cardiff International White Water

The centre also has a café with Wi-Fi access, two conference rooms, and a retail area. The White Water Cafe's True Taste of Wales menu consists of locally sourced Welsh ingredients, organic produce, and Fair Trade products.

There is also a retail shop onsite that sells white water related items.

== Partners ==
CIWW works with industry leaders including Cardiff Council, Cardiff Harbour Authority, Canoe Wales, RNLI, South Wales Fire and Rescue Service and the Welsh Assembly Government.

== Transport ==
The site is connected to the national road network via the Cogan Spur on the A4055 of the A4232 which leads to M4 J33 (Cardiff West).

The nearest station is Cogan railway station, approximately 10 minutes away by foot. There are four trains per hour northbound to Cardiff Central, three southbound to Barry Island and one southbound to Bridgend via Rhoose Cardiff International Airport.

Cardiff Bus routes 9, 9A, 35 and 36 which through the village to Cardiff city centre.

The nearest airport is Cardiff International Airport, about 30 minutes away by road, or by rail on the Vale of Glamorgan line from Cogan railway station, which has frequent scheduled and charter flights to the UK, Europe, North America and Africa.

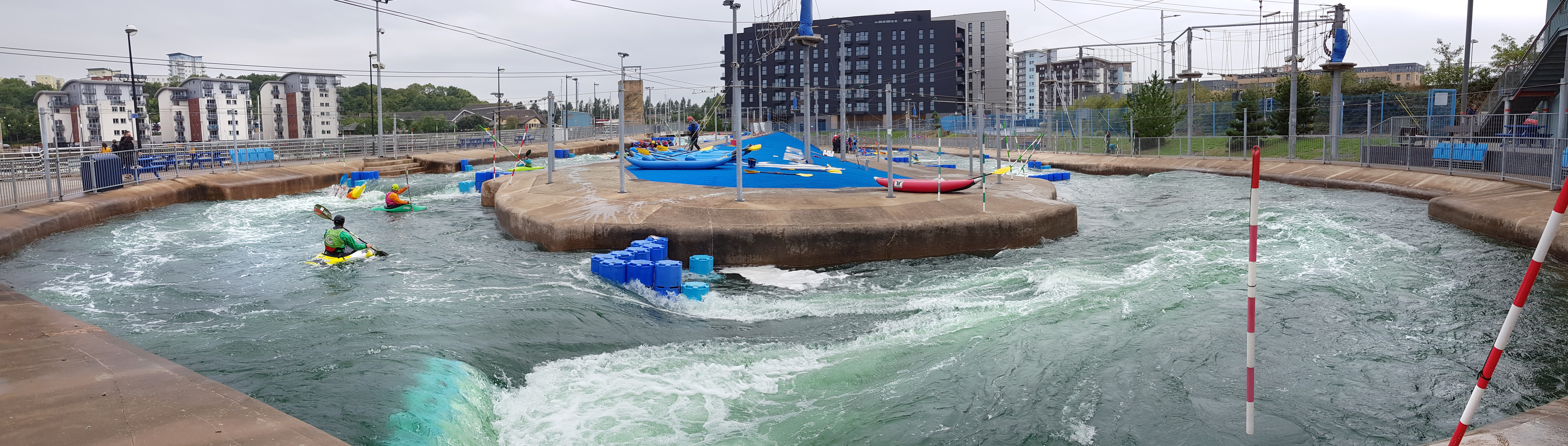
Cardiff International White Water

== See also ==
- Cardiff Harbour Authority
- Cardiff Sailing Centre
