= Cardiff Harbour Authority =

Council manager of Cardiff Bay barrage

- Awdurdod Harbwr Caerdydd
- The official logo of Cardiff Harbour Authority

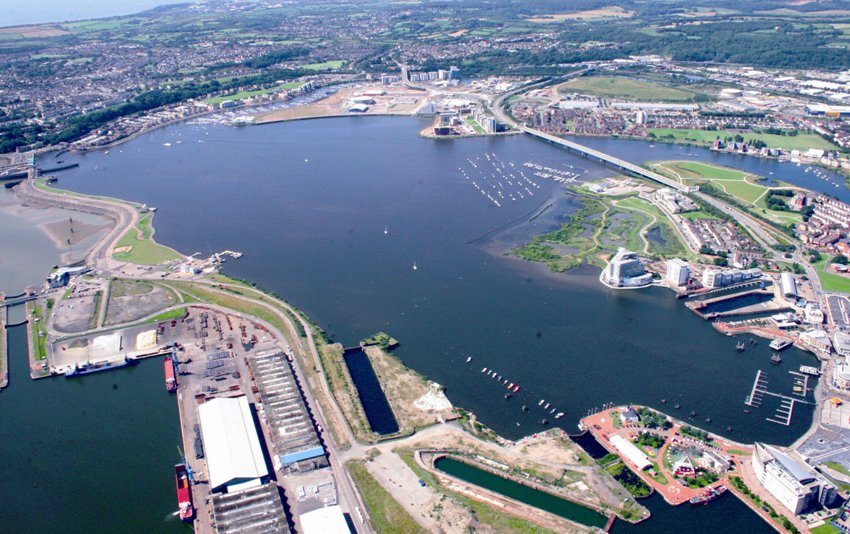
- Aerial view of Cardiff Bay

Authority overview
- Formed: 1 April 2000
- Preceding Authority: Cardiff Bay Development Corporation
- Jurisdiction: Inland waters and outer harbour of Cardiff Bay
- Headquarters: Queen Alexandra House, Cargo Road, Cardiff; 51.453181°N 3.161161°W
- Annual budget: £7.5m
- Key document: Cardiff Bay Barrage Act 1993
- Website: cardiffharbour.com

Cardiff Harbour Authority (CHA) is the managing authority for Cardiff Bay under the Cardiff Bay Barrage Act 1993, and was established on 1 April 2000. It took over responsibility from Cardiff Bay Development Corporation and is responsible for the inland bay, Cardiff Bay Barrage, the outer harbour and the rivers Taff and Ely. The harbour authority is part of the City of Cardiff Council and is the statutory navigation authority for Cardiff Bay.

The authority is funded by the Welsh Government.

== Responsibilities ==
CHA's responsibility includes the inland waters of Cardiff Bay (including the Mount Stuart Graving Docks), the River Taff up to Blackweir, the River Ely up to Wiggins Teape weir, the outer harbour and Cardiff Bay Barrage. CHA was also given responsibility for the land areas of Roald Dahl Plass and the Channel Graving Dock.

The Authority assumed this responsibility from Cardiff Bay Development Corporation upon its dissolution on 31 March 2000.

They are also responsible for a number of facilities around Cardiff Bay:

- Cardiff Bay Tourist Information Centre located in the Wales Millennium Centre. Originally the Cardiff Bay Visitor Centre, known as "The Tube" (dismantled in 2010)
- Cardiff International White Water
- Cardiff Rowing Centre, previously known as CBWAC
- Cardiff Sailing Centre
- Flat Holm Project
- Norwegian Church

Cardiff Harbour Authority today has a number of statutory duties, including traffic control, security, navigational safety (including buoys, beacons, bridge lights and channel surveys), conservation (including dredging, maintaining river banks and the wetland wildlife reserve), encouraging both commercial and leisure uses of the bay, and protecting its environment. The CHA is responsible for the operation of the three sea locks, the five sluices that maintain the water level in the bay and the fish pass that allows migratory Salmon and Sea Trout to return to the rivers to spawn.

== Offices ==
The authority's main offices are based in Queen Alexandra House, alongside the Cardiff Docks sea lock, however the barrage is managed from the Barrage Control Building which overlooks the three sea locks and outer harbour, and the Harbour Master is based in the Environment Building at the north end of the barrage.

== Vessels ==
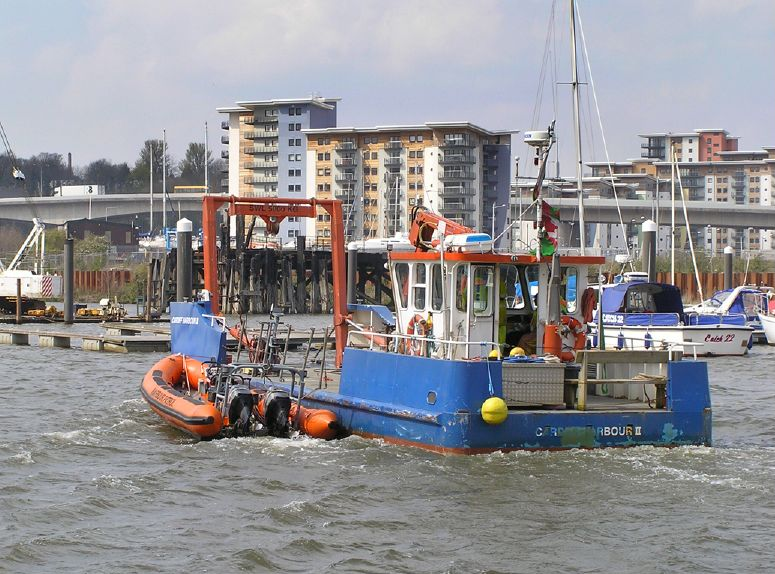
Cardiff Harbour Authority workboat and patrol RIB.

CHA operates a number of patrol, workboat, survey and general duty vessels in order to comply with its statutory duties. The authority took delivery of a new general duties boat in 2014, built by Northumberland-based shipbuilder Alnmaritec.

== Emergency services ==
CHA works closely with a number of emergency services. South Wales Police regularly store a Ribcraft 9m RIB on site, South Wales Fire and Rescue Service have a 5.3m rescue boat moored on the barrage, and there is a memorandum of understanding between CHA, Maritime and Coastguard Agency, HM Coastguard, RNLI, SW Fire and Rescue, the Welsh Ambulance Service and Bristow Helicopters Search and Rescue in regard to search and rescue operations within the bay.

== See also ==
- List of navigation authorities in the United Kingdom
