= Inkin =

Inkin (Russian: Инкин) is a Russian surname. Notable people with the surname include:

- Denis Inkin (born 1978), Russian boxer
- Geoffrey Inkin (1934–2013), British army commander
