= Penarth Head =

Coordinates: 51.4416°N 3.1637°W

Penarth Head seen from Lavernock to the south

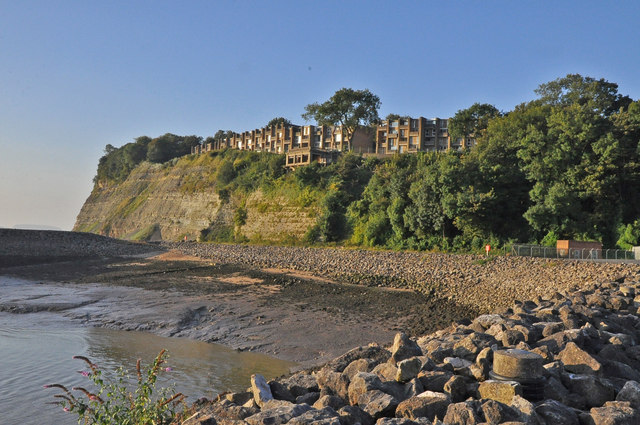
Penarth Head seen from near the Cardiff Bay Barrage

Penarth Head is a headland in Penarth on the south coast of South Wales near the Welsh capital city of Cardiff.

St Augustine's Church sits on the highest point of the Head and has been used as a landmark to aid navigation for seafarers for centuries. When the medieval church was replaced in the 1860s, Bristol Channel pilots demanded the new church had a tall tower. William Butterfield's new church was built with a 90-foot tower.

The Cardiff Bay Barrage lies across the mouth of Cardiff Bay, between Queen Alexandra Dock in Cardiff docks and Penarth Head.

In 2015 a viewing platform was built in Penarth Head Park, which lies on the edge of the Head at the end of Penarth Head Lane. The park, with views to Penarth Pier and across to Flat Holm, was to have interpretation boards, as well as a mosaic in the shape of the Wales Coast Path logo. At 200 feet above sea level, the park is claimed to be the highest point on the entire route of the Wales Coast Path, though the coastal path ascends Yr Eifl on the Llŷn Peninsula reaches a height of 1,850 feet above sea level.
