= Craft in the Bay =

Building in Cardiff, Wales

Coordinates: 51.4658°N 3.16487°W

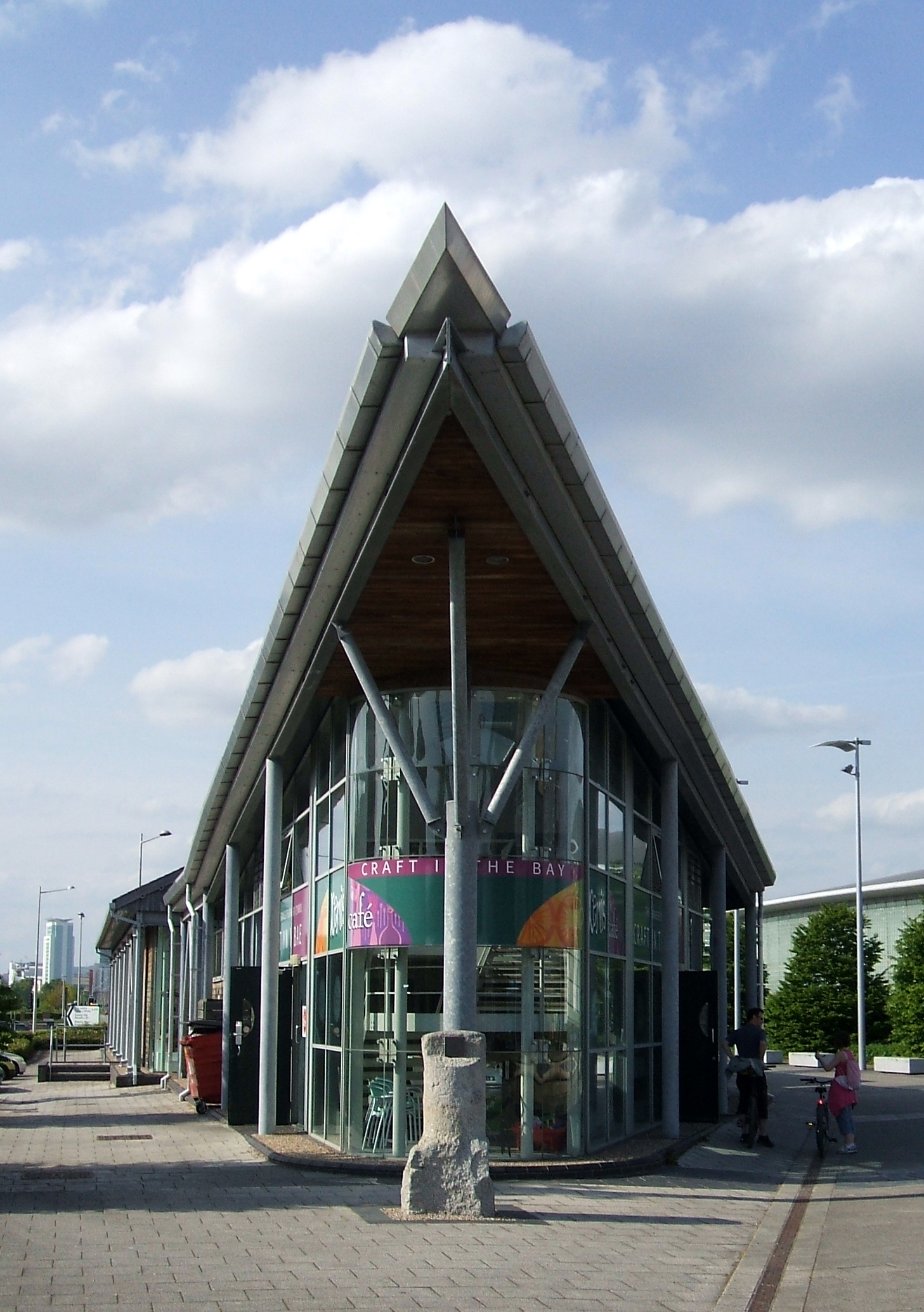
Craft in the Bay

The Craft in the Bay Gallery is an exhibition and craft retail area located at the south end of Lloyd George Avenue, Cardiff Bay. It was designed by the architect Chris Elford. It is operated by a charitable arts organisation, The Makers Guild in Wales. The gallery is opposite the Wales Millennium Centre and close to the Senedd building. The building consists of the relocated and refurbished Grade II listed “D” Shed, previously an industrial warehouse located next to Bute East Dock.

== D Shed ==
The "D" Shed is a cast-iron framed structure with cruciform columns, a roof structure and a variety of similarly unique features. The structure is five 20-foot bays long and two 20-foot bays wide. It was erected as a transit warehouse and appeared on the first edition Ordnance Survey map from surveys carried out in the 1870s. Originally sited alongside Bute East Dock Basin it was also served by rail. The “D Shed” has a Grade II listing and is one of only a few mid-nineteenth century buildings in Cardiff Bay. It has wholly cast cruciform columns and the eaves beams have been constructed out of simple available riveted sections. The cast iron used in the eave beams is stamped 'Rhymney' so it is assumed manufacture was in the Rhymney Ironworks. The roof truss design includes a bent bottom member and cast iron stays.

As a Grade II listed building the CADW Listing states

The building marked on First Edition Ordnance Survey map (surveyed 1870s) as warehouse beside Bute East Dock Basin. Known as "D" Shed, it was dismantled in the 1990s, and re-assembled on its present site in 2002. Northern section is mid C19 warehouse/transit shed. Slate roof. Gables in vertical boarding with blocked tripartite window. Iron frame construction of 5 bays by 2, with cruciform-sectioned Tuscan-style columns supporting I-beam entablature. Walling on west side in wooden boarding imitating the original structure of boarding with sliding doors; other sides glazed. Roof of iron construction with closely-spaced trusses; system of narrow tie bars with v-shaped cast-iron stays bolted to rafters. Early C21 extension at S end, of triangular plan, in metal and glass, reflecting the materials of the original. Listed for special interest of C19 section of building, a rare example in Wales of a mid C19 iron framed dock warehouse/transit shed.

Before it was refurbished, the building was used as a garage workshop. Work started in late 2001 to transform it, with an estimated total cost of £1.26 million. Funding came from the European Regional Development Fund, Heritage Lottery Fund and the Arts Council of Wales. In 2002 the building was dismantled and removed from its original site next to Bute East Dock. It was reassembled in its new location, together with a modern extension. The refurbished building won a British Archaeological Award.

The finished building is sheer-glazed on two sides to provide views into the exhibition space. The extension was designed as a contrasting element and accommodates demonstration studios, meeting space, office and a café with a dramatic pointed roof projecting over an outside seating space.
