= Lloyd George Avenue =

Road in Cardiff, Wales

Coordinates: 51.46969°N 3.16789°W

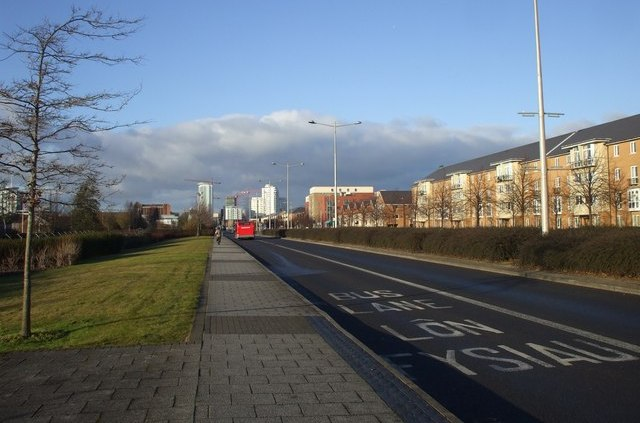
Lloyd George Avenue looking north

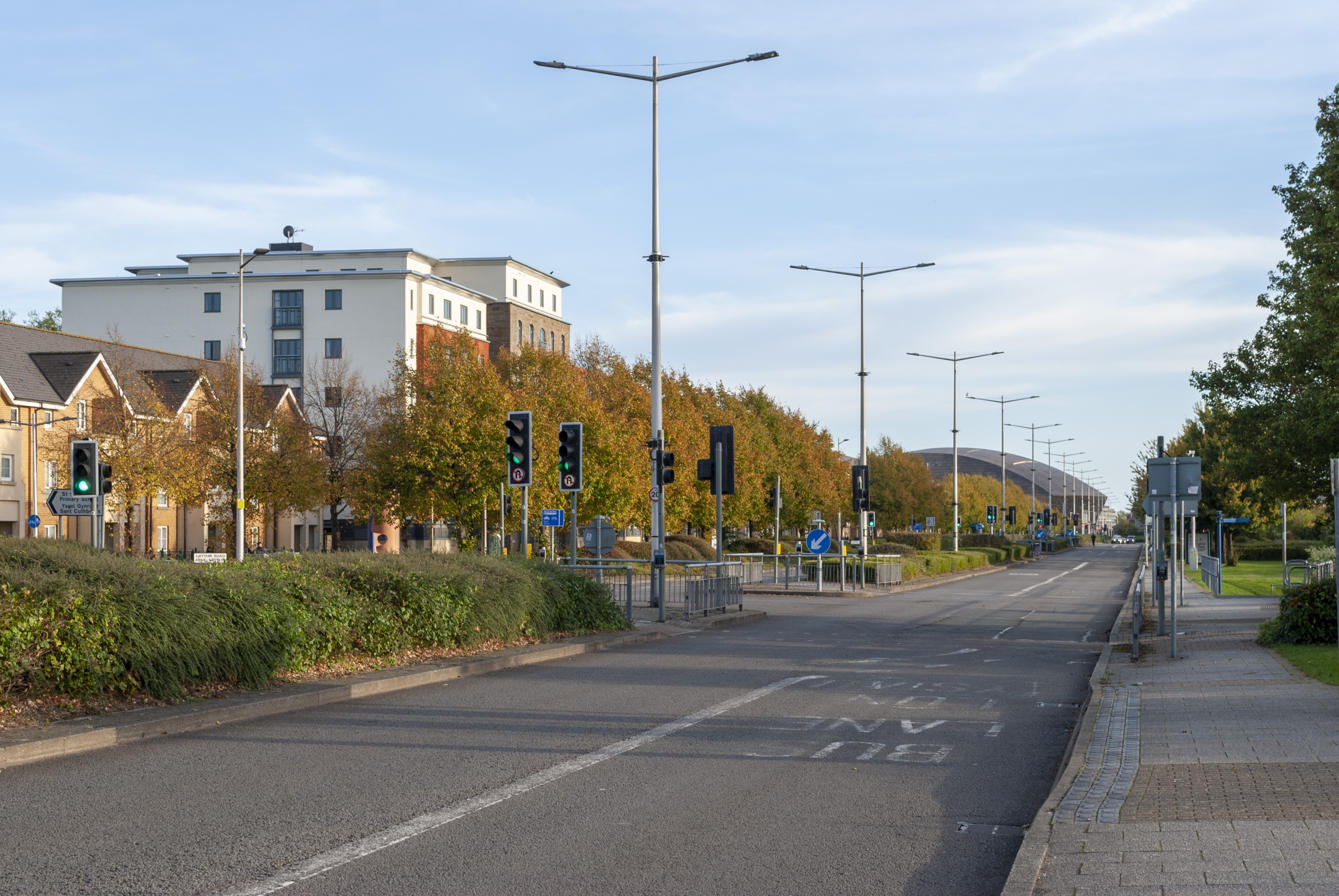
Lloyd George Avenue looking south towards the Wales Millennium Centre

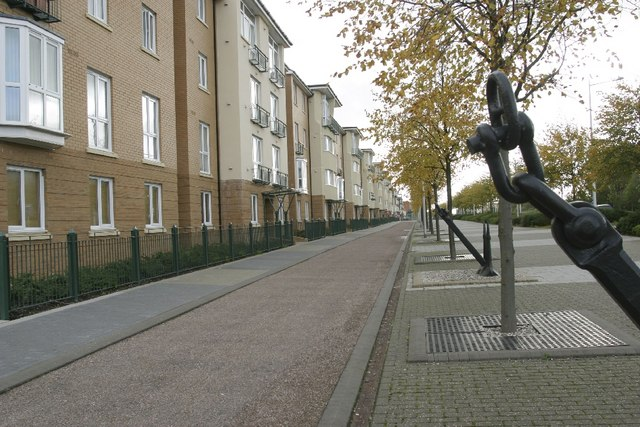
Lloyd George Avenue development won for its contractors Norwest Holst, the Arts & Business Cymru Award for Best Sponsor of New Work in 2001

Lloyd George Avenue (Welsh: Rhodfa Lloyd George), originally known as Bute Avenue, is an avenue in Cardiff, Wales. Roughly one mile long, the road links the Inner Harbour of Cardiff Bay to Cardiff city centre and forms part of the A470 road. It runs parallel to Bute Street and the Butetown Branch Line. Landscaping on the route was completed in 2000, and it was renamed after the Liberal prime minister David Lloyd George. The site of the avenue had been known as Collingdon Road, which was described as a "grimy industrial area of small factories and workshops, employing hundreds of people".

The original concept, a scheme by Cardiff Bay Development Corporation (CBDC), envisaged the removal of the railway line along Bute Street to create a continental-style boulevard, initially named Bute Avenue, with a Light Rapid Transit system, a park and recreational facilities. The Welsh Office required the CBDC to use the Private Finance Initiative to construct Bute Avenue. Due to high costs, the LRT element of the project was abandoned, but a new road was built as part of a £120 million PFI scheme awarded to a consortium of investors and shareholders named City Link. After the wind-up of the CBDC in March 2000, all property rights and liabilities for the Bute Avenue project transferred to the Welsh Development Agency.

In 2011 the Welsh Government revealed that the full cost of the PFI scheme, including its 25-year payback period, would be £188.8 million. This includes the 350 neighbouring homes, some shops, commercial development and a small section of new road surrounding Callaghan Square. Responsibility for ongoing maintenance reverts to Cardiff Council in 2025.

Although officials from the Welsh Development Agency and the City and County of Cardiff have examined various options for the completion of the original boulevard scheme, as of 2011 no progress has been made.
