= Voco St David's Cardiff Hotel =

Hotel in Cardiff, Wales

voco St David's Cardiff Hotel
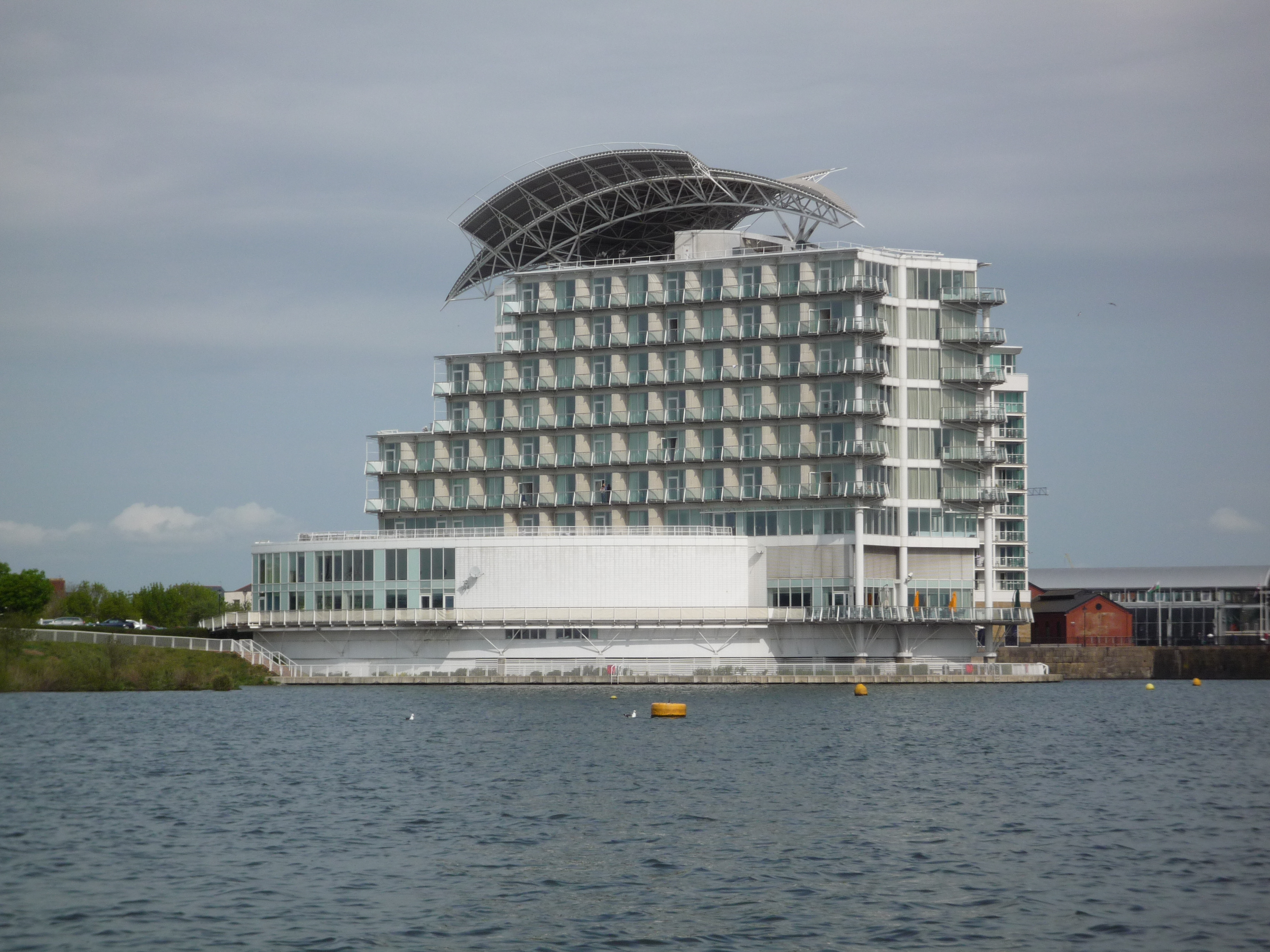
- St David's Hotel from Cardiff Bay

- Location within Cardiff

General information
- Location: Havannah Street, Cardiff Bay, Butetown, Cardiff, Wales, United Kingdom
- Coordinates: 51°27′37.65″N 3°10′2.18″W
- Opening: 1999
- Owner: IHG
- Management: Voco

Design and construction
- Architect: Patrick Davies

Other information
- Number of rooms: 142

Website
- official website

The voco St David's Cardiff Hotel is a five-star hotel situated in Cardiff, Wales, just off the A4232 road, and close to Cardiff Bay railway station. Opened originally in 1999 by Rocco Forte Hotels, since 2018 it has been operating under the Voco name.

== History ==
The first five-star hotel in Wales, the building features a sweeping sail-topped roof and a lofty atrium lobby. Situated on Cardiff Bay, the hotel overlooks Mermaid Quay and the Cardiff Bay Barrage. The hotel was used as the venue where the results of the 1999 Welsh Labour leadership election were announced.

The 142-room hotel was the first new hotel built by the Rocco Forte Hotels group in the UK. The hotel was purchased by Principal Hotel Company in 2007 and again changed hands in 2018 when it was acquired by IHG, and became the second Voco hotel to be opened.

== Accommodation ==
There are 142 guestrooms available including doubles, twins and suites.

== Facilities ==
The St. David's Marine Spa offers thalassotherapy as well as holistic and aromatherapy treatments. Facilities include a swimming pool, marine hydrotherapy pools and a gymnasium.
