= Voco =

Lifestyle hotel chain

voco™ hotels by IHG
- Industry: Hotel
- Founded: 2018
- Number of locations: 71 (79 in pipeline)
- Area served: Australasia, China, Taiwan, Europe, Singapore, Middle East, USA
- Parent: InterContinental Hotels Group
- Website: www.vocohotels.com

Voco (stylized as voco) is a hotel brand owned by the InterContinental Hotels Group.

== History ==
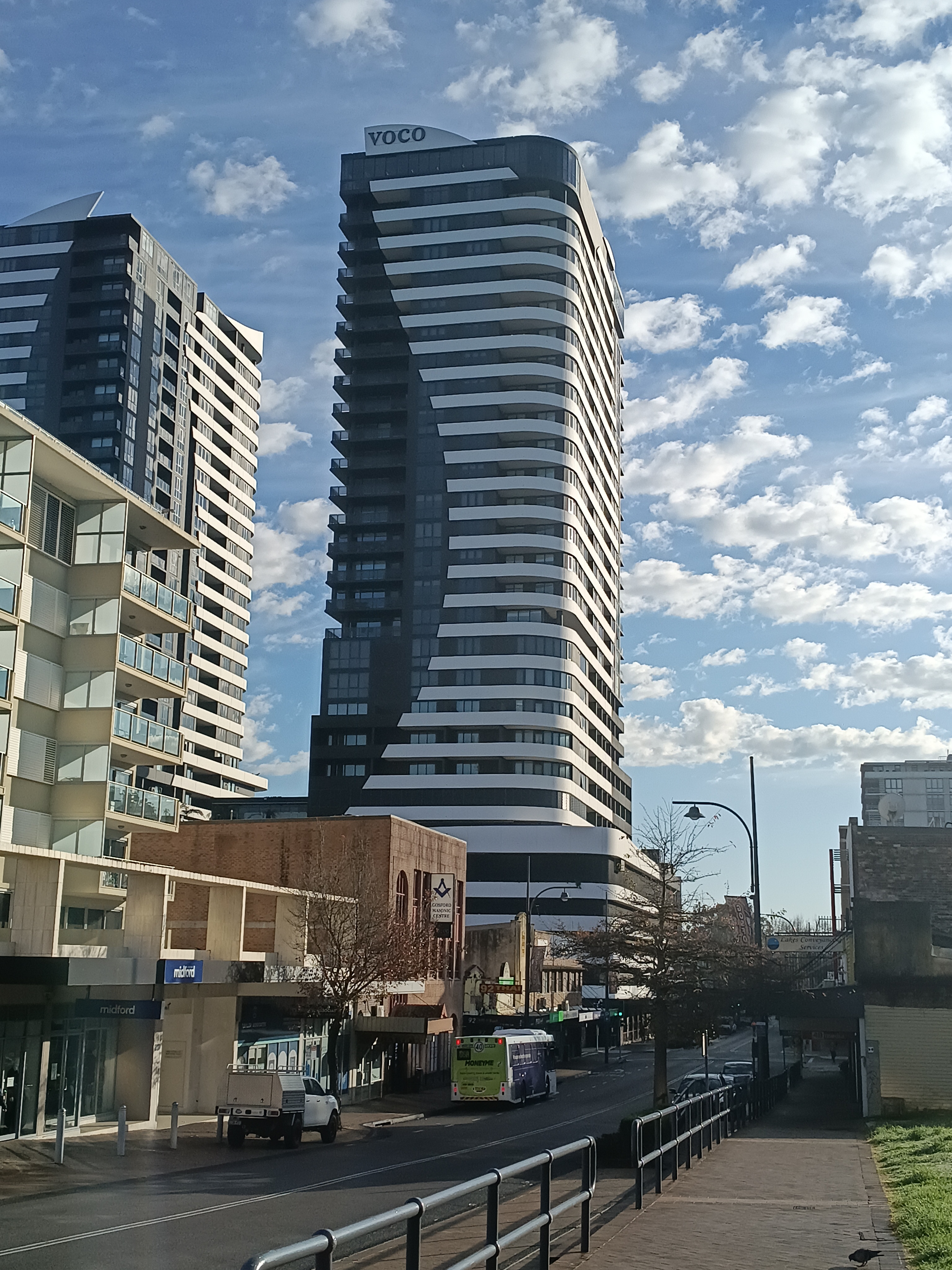
The voco Gosford hotel building in Gosford, New South Wales, opened in 2025.

Since launching in 2018, voco has opened hotels in the UK, Australia, Singapore, United Arab Emirates and Saudi Arabia. The name voco is derived from the Latin word meaning ‘to invite’ or ‘to come together’.

The first locations include the rebranding of 12 hotels from Covivio and the 388-room Watermark Hotel in Gold Coast, Australia. In 2018, IHG leased thirteen luxury hotels in the UK; voco St David's Cardiff Hotel became the first voco hotel in Europe. In 2021, IHG announced 50 hotels had signed up to carry the brand in more than 20 countries..The first voco hotel in South West Asia opened in Jim Corbett, India in April 2024.

In late 2025, IHG opened voco Gosford in Gosford, New South Wales, as part of the brand's continued expansion in Australia.
