= Cardiff Sailing Centre =

Watersports facility in Wales

Cardiff Sailing Centre (Welsh: Canolfan Hwylio Caerdydd) is a Cardiff Council run watersports facility based on Cardiff Bay Barrage in Cardiff Bay. The centre runs dinghy & keelboat sailing, windsurfing, powerboat and other shore-based courses.

== History ==
The centre opened in 1968 as Llanishen Sailing Centre and was based at Llanishen Reservoir in North Cardiff. It was rebranded in 2010 when the centre was forced to relocate to Cardiff Bay due to the draining of the reservoir but is still one of the major watersports centre's in Wales.

The centre has produced a number of Welsh national, GB National and international sailors over the years, including Olympic Gold & Silver medallist Hannah Mills MBE who started sailing at the centre in 1996 and won the Silver Medal at the 2012 Summer Olympics in Weymouth and the Gold Medal at the 2016 Summer Olympics in Rio de Janeiro.

A number of regional, national and international events have been held at the centre over the years, including the 2001 Summer Games of the Special Olympics UK and recently facilitating the hosting of the Extreme Sailing Series since 2011 and the 2017–18 Volvo Ocean Race.
