= Geoffrey Inkin =

Geoffrey Inkin OBE DL
- Born: Geoffrey David Inkin; 2 October 1934
- Died: 22 August 2013 (aged 78)
- Occupations: British Army Lieutenant colonel Business executive

Sir Geoffrey David Inkin OBE DL (2 October 1934 – 22 August 2013) was a commanding officer of the Royal Welch Fusiliers and a lay member of the Judicial Appointments Commission (for England and Wales).

== Early life ==
Inkin was born on 2 October 1934, in Penarth, Glamorgan, Wales, the son of Noel Inkin and his wife, Evelyn Margaret. He attended Dean Close School, Cheltenham.

== Military career ==
Having attended the Royal Military Academy Sandhurst, Inkin was commissioned into the Royal Welch Fusiliers on 4 February 1955 as a second lieutenant. He was given the service number 440038. He served in Malaya from 1955 to 1957, during the Malayan Emergency. He was promoted to lieutenant on 4 February 1957, and to captain on 4 February 1961. He was promoted to major on 31 December 1967. Having attended the Staff College, Camberley, he was promoted to lieutenant colonel on 31 December 1971 with seniority from 30 June 1971.

He retired from the British Army on 10 January 1974.

== Post-military career ==
Inkin was Chairman of the Cardiff Bay Development Corporation from 1987 until 2000 and chairman of the Land Authority of Wales between 1987 and 1998. He was a member of Gwent County Council and Gwent Police Authority.

== Personal life ==
Inkin was twice married. His first marriage was to Susan Elizabeth Sheldon in 1961. Together they had three children, all sons. Their marriage was dissolved in 1998. In 1998, he married Susan Inglefield (née Turcan).

Lady Inkin contested Vale of Glamorgan for the Conservative Party in the 2001 General Election.

== Honours and decorations ==
On 14 July 1959, it was announced Inkin had been Mentioned in Despatches "in recognition of gallant and distinguished services in Cyprus for the period 1st January to 30th June 1959".

In the 1972 New Year Honours, he was appointed Member of the Order of the British Empire (MBE). He was promoted to Officer of the Order of the British Empire (OBE) on 18 December 1973 "in recognition of distinguished services in Northern Ireland during the period 1 May 1973 – 31 July 1973".

In November 1981, he was nominated for the position of High Sheriff of Gwent. On 15 April 1983, he was appointed Deputy Lieutenant of Gwent by the Lord Lieutenant. He was once more nominated for the position of High Sheriff of Gwent in November 1984. In 1987, then living at Court St. Lawrence, Llangovan, Monmouth, he was appointed as High Sheriff of Gwent.
