= Cardiff Bay =

Area and lake in Cardiff, Wales

Coordinates: 51.463°N 3.164°W

Cardiff Bay: Welsh: Bae Caerdydd; The Bay
- Area and Lake
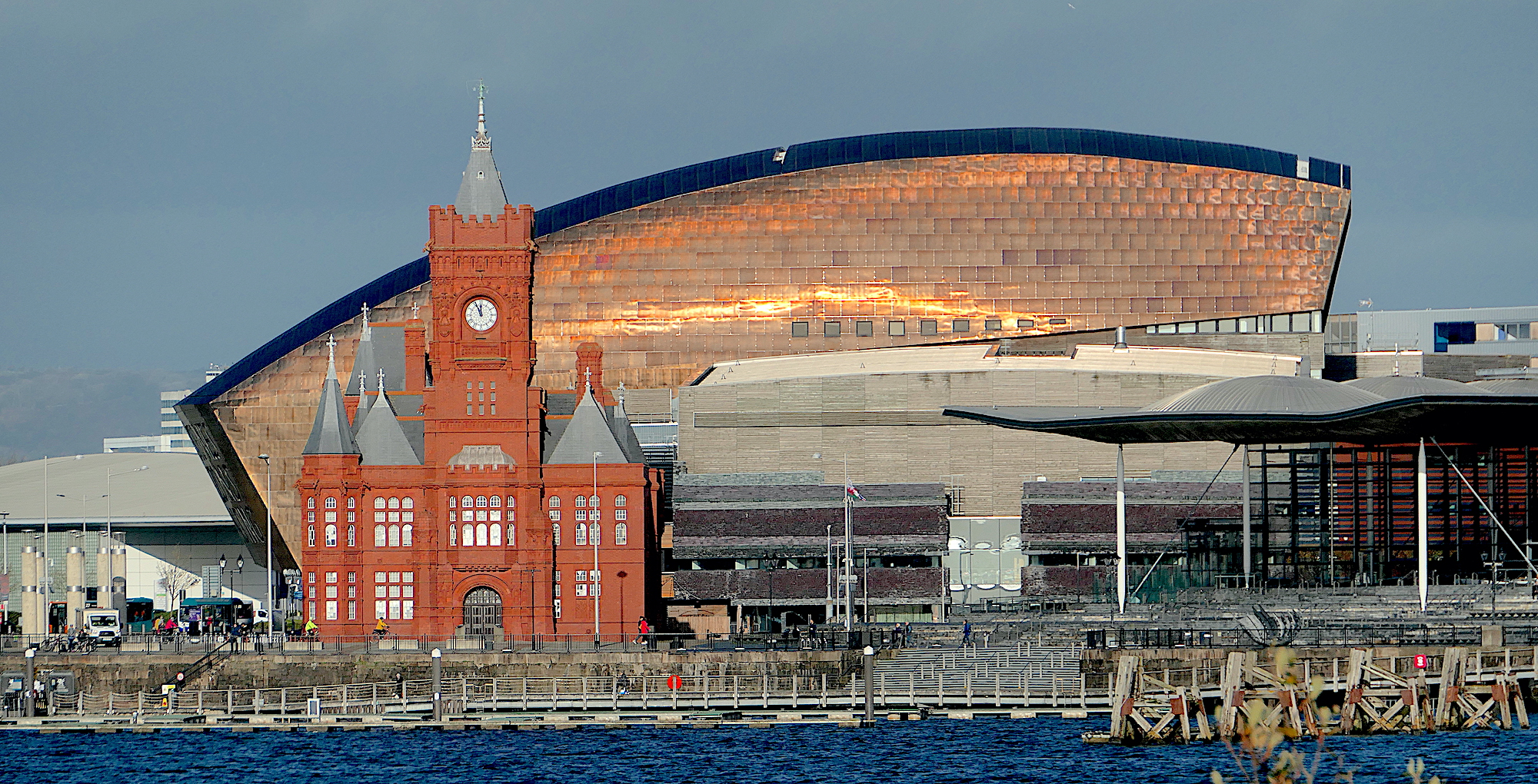
- Cardiff Bay in 2020, Pierhead Building (left), Senedd building (right), and Millennium Centre (behind)

- Location within Cardiff
- Principal area: Cardiff
- Country: Wales
- Sovereign state: United Kingdom
- Post town: CARDIFF
- Postcode district: CF10
- Dialling code: 029
- UK Parliament: Cardiff South and Penarth
- Senedd Cymru – Welsh Parliament: Cardiff South and Penarth
- Website: http://www.cardiffharbour.com/ Cardiff Harbour Authority http://www.visitcardiffbay.info/ Visit Cardiff Bay

Cardiff Bay (Welsh: Bae Caerdydd; colloquially "The Bay") is an area and freshwater lake in Cardiff, Wales. The site of a former tidal bay and estuary, it is the river mouth of the River Taff and Ely. The body of water was converted into a 500-acre (2.0 km^{2}) lake as part of a pre-devolution UK Government regeneration project, involving the damming of the rivers by the Cardiff Bay Barrage in 1999. The barrage impounds the rivers from the Severn Estuary, providing flood defence and the creation of a permanent non-tidal high water lake with limited access to the sea, serving as a core feature of the redevelopment of the area in the 1990s.

Surrounding the lake is a 4.25 sq mi (11.0 square kilometres) area of redeveloped former derelict docklands which shares its name. The area is situated between Cardiff city centre and Penarth, in the communities of Butetown and Grangetown. Its waterfront is home to notable attractions, in particular regarding Welsh politics and devolved institutions, such as the Senedd building (housing the Senedd, the Welsh Parliament), Pierhead Building and Tŷ Hywel; and cultural attractions including the Wales Millennium Centre and Norwegian Church. The presence of devolved institutions in Cardiff Bay has led to its name's use as a metonym for devolved Welsh politics. According to Cardiff Council, the creation of Cardiff Bay is regarded as one of the most successful regeneration projects in the United Kingdom. The bay was formerly tidal, with access to the sea limited to a couple of hours each side of high water but now provides 24-hour access through three locks.

The Cardiff Bay Wetlands Reserve is situated along the northern edge of the lake, on the site of a former salt marsh.

== History ==
On 15 June 1910 the Terra Nova Expedition left the Roath Basin in Cardiff's docklands and headed south to Antarctica. On board were Captain Robert Falcon Scott and members of his British Antarctic Expedition, who aimed to be the first to reach the South Pole. Scott's entire party of five died on the return journey from the pole.

Cardiff Bay played a major part in Cardiff’s development by being the means of exporting coal from the South Wales Valleys to the rest of the world, helping to power the industrial age. The coal mining industry helped fund the building of Cardiff into the capital city of Wales and helped the Third Marquis of Bute, who owned the docks, become the richest man in the world at the time.

As Cardiff exports grew, so did its population; dockworkers and sailors from across the world settled in neighbourhoods close to the docks, known as Tiger Bay, and communities from up to 50 different nationalities, including Norwegian, Somali, Yemeni, Greek, Spanish, Italian, Caribbean and Irish helped create the unique multicultural character of the area.

After the Second World War most of the industry closed down and the area became a neglected part of Cardiff, a wasteland of derelict docks and mudflats. Social exclusion of the area's inhabitants rose and Cardiff Bay had above average levels of unemployment. But, in 1999, new life was injected into the area by the building of the Cardiff Bay Barrage, one of the most controversial building projects of the day but also one of the most successful.

== Development ==
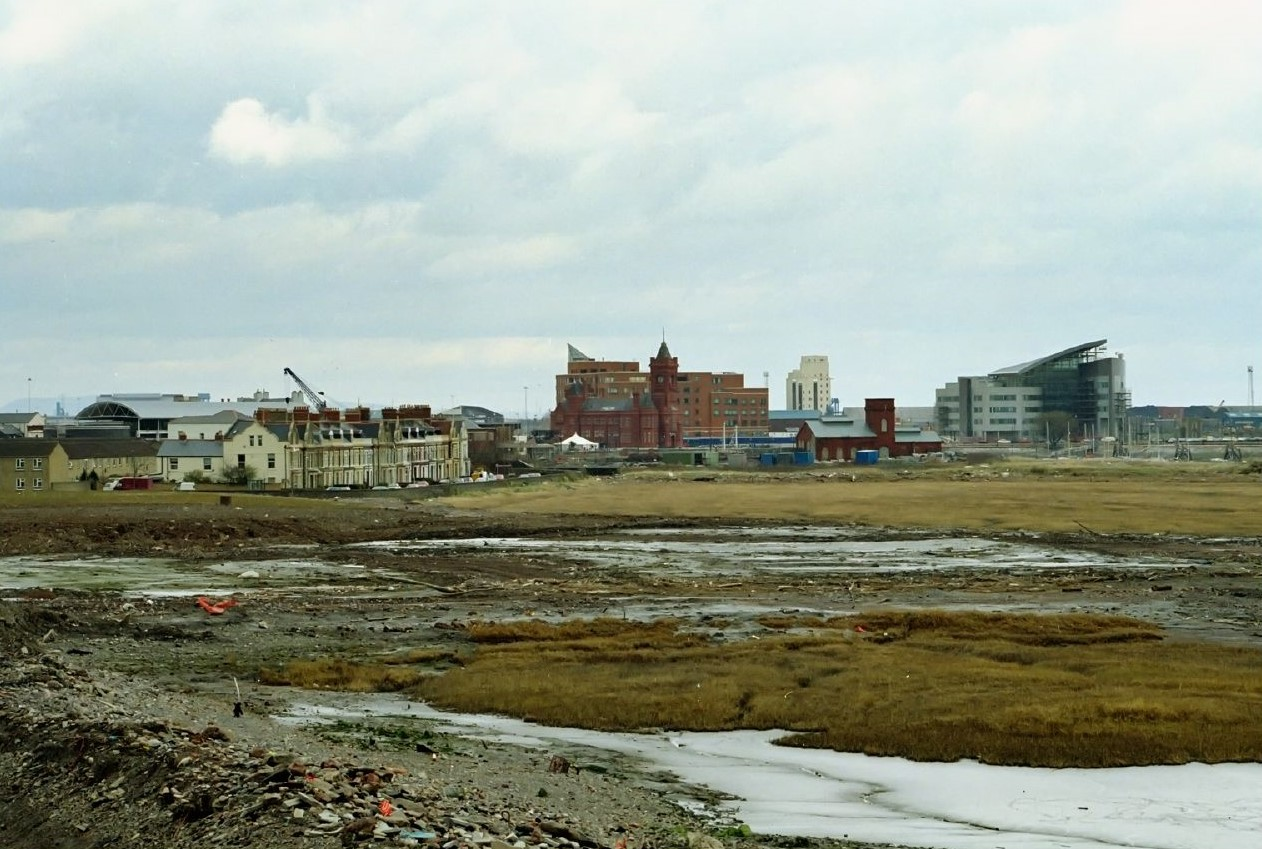
Cardiff Bay before the construction of the Cardiff Bay Barrage

The Cardiff Bay Development Corporation (CBDC) was created in 1987 to stimulate the redevelopment of 1,100 hectares (2,700 acres) of derelict land. The Development Corporation aimed to attract private capital by spending public money to improve the area. Despite opposition by environmentalists and wildlife organisations, the mudflats at the mouths of the River Taff and River Ely were inundated, with loss of habitat for wading birds. The Barrage has created several new habitats for freshwater species with the wetlands to the south of the Hamadryad Park.

When the Development Corporation was wound up in on 31 March 2000, it had achieved many of its objectives. The whole area was unrecognisable from ten years before. Much private land was now open to the public, particularly around the inner harbour and the north side of Roath basin. Work is progressing to complete a 13 kilometre walkway around the bay. In addition, the development has enabled land in the city centre to be redeveloped for higher-value uses.

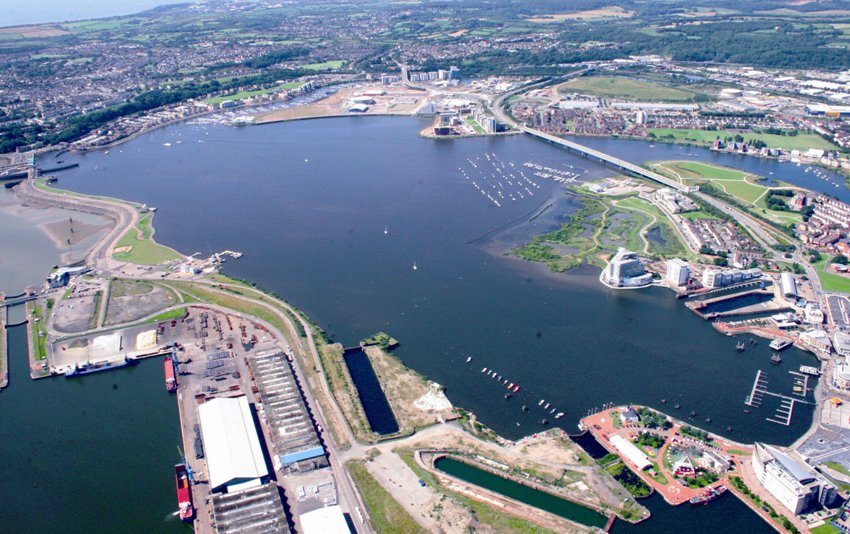
Cardiff Bay in 2008

Connecting the bay area to the centre of Cardiff was a primary goal when plans to develop the docklands were first mooted. Original plans included a grand boulevard (similar to where Lloyd George Avenue is located now) with high-density commercial and residential units straddling both sides. This would have created significant demand for quality public transport provisions facilitating connections to the new Bay area but public transport was often of poor quality and, but there are now much-improved connections through the Cardiff Bus BayCar service and rail service from Cardiff Queen Street to Cardiff Bay railway station.

On 30 January 2013 the planning consultant, Adrian Jones, stated that Cardiff Bay was a contender for the "worst example of waterside regeneration in Britain".

== Notable buildings ==
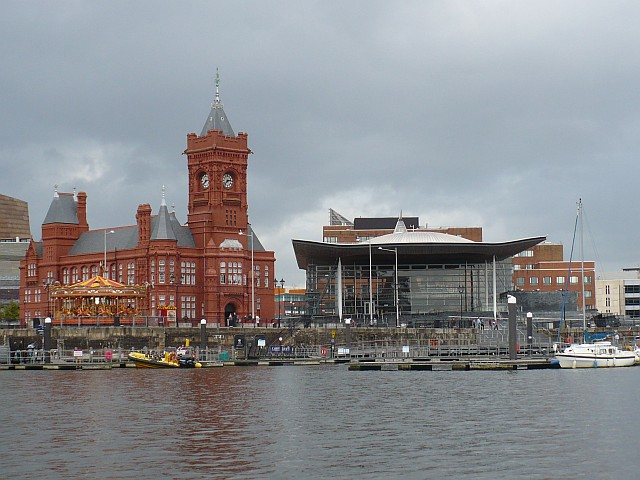
Pierhead Building (left) and the Senedd building (right)

=== St David's Hotel ===
The St David's Hotel & Spa is a 5-star luxury hotel with commanding views of the bay and Penarth. Built by Rocco Forte in 2000, the hotel was sold in 2007, to Principal-Haley hotels.

=== The Pierhead Building ===
The Pierhead was built in 1897 and designed by William Frame, who studied under William Burges It was formerly the headquarters of the Bute Dock Company, later the Cardiff Railway Company, and then the head office for the Great Western Railway. Today it is part of the Senedd estate and is used as an event and conference venue, it is also a Grade I listed building.

=== Senedd building ===
The Senedd building is the building that hosts the Senedd's debating chamber and committee rooms.

=== Wales Millennium Centre ===
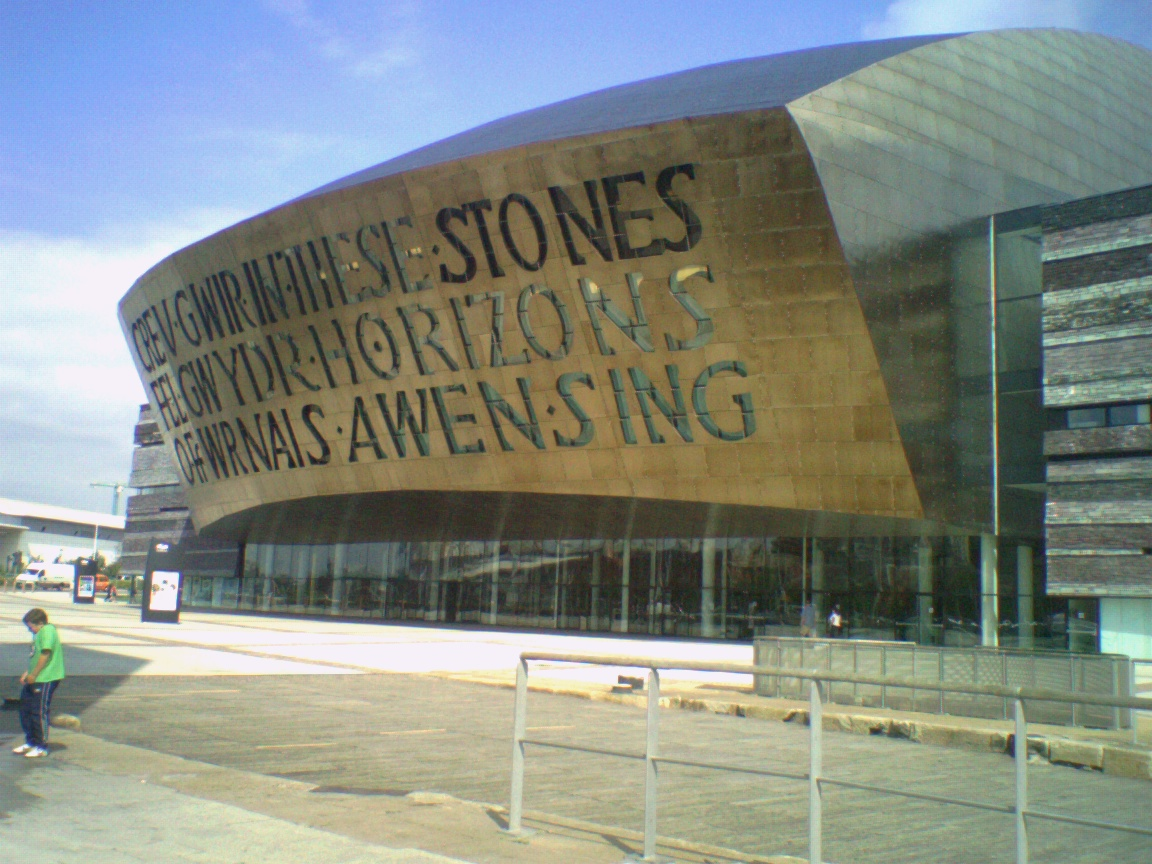
The Wales Millennium Centre, seen from Roald Dahl Plass

The Wales Millennium Centre is home to the Welsh National Opera.

=== Norwegian Church ===
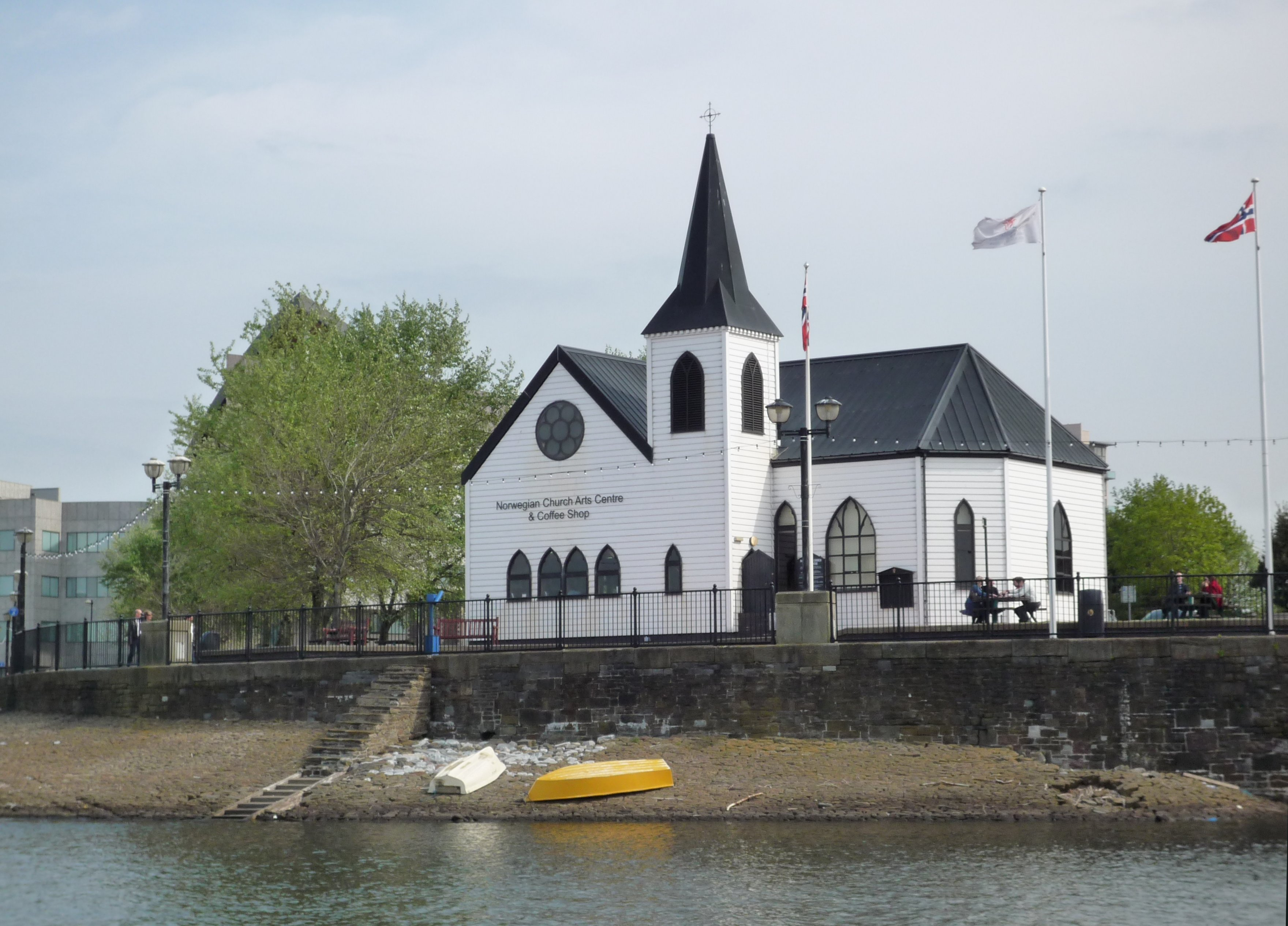
Norwegian Church from the water

The Norwegian Church Arts Centre, is a rescued historic wooden church that was rebuilt in 1992 and operates as a registered self funded non-profit charity. It is managed by Cardiff Harbour Authority and is as a venue for small concerts, art exhibitions, conferences, meetings and celebrations.

When living in Cardiff as a child, famous children's author Roald Dahl attended this church.

=== Craft in the Bay ===
A refurbished Victorian dockside building houses Craft in the Bay, the home of the Makers Guild in Wales.

=== Techniquest ===
Techniquest is an educational science & discovery centre, which also includes a science theatre and planetarium.

=== Roald Dahl Plass ===
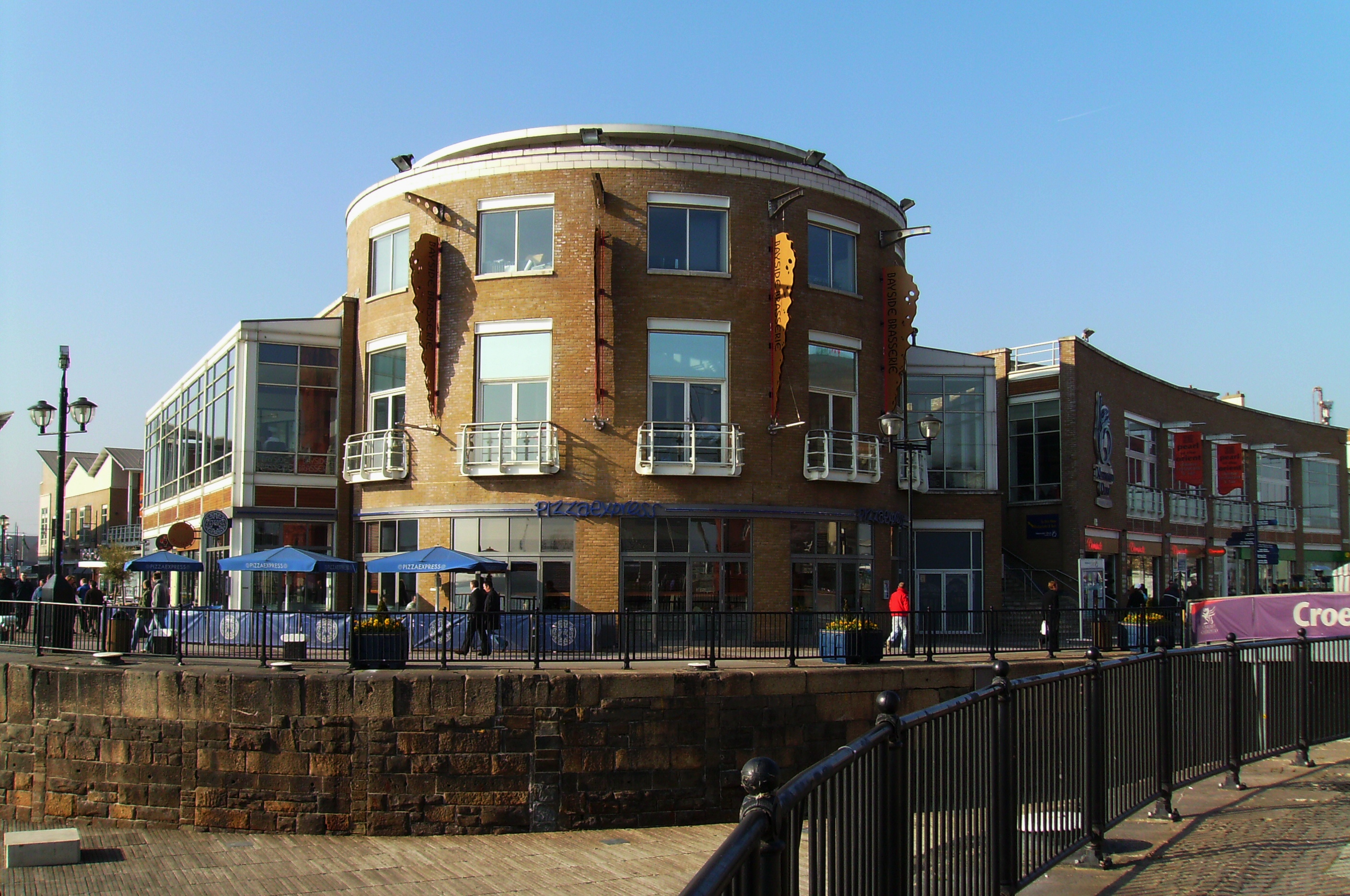
Mermaid Quay

Roald Dahl Plass is a large open amphitheatre style plaza frequently used as a venue for carnivals and festivals all year round.

=== Mermaid Quay ===
Mermaid Quay comprises a mix of restaurants, bars, cafés, shops and services located on the waterfront.

=== The Tube (Cardiff Bay Visitor Centre) ===
Dismantled in 2010, this unique building "single-handedly put Cardiff on the architectural map", housing exhibitions and visitor information.

== Water-based attractions ==
- Cardiff Bay Barrage – accessible via the Water Bus and by road, and free to explore and also has guided tours.
- Cardiff Bay Wetland Reserve – 8-hectare (0.080 km^{2}) reserve home to rare birds and a boardwalk leading to a viewing platform.
- Cardiff Bay Yacht Club – located at the Cardiff International Sports Village, RYA Training centre and one of the largest yacht clubs in the UK
- Cardiff International Pool.
- Cardiff International White Water.
- Cardiff Rowing Centre – located in Channel View Centre.
- Cardiff Sailing Centre – A council run watersports & RYA Training Centre based on Cardiff Bay Barrage.
- Cardiff Waterbus – which offers a public transport service and tourist cruises.
- Ice Arena Wales – ice rink in the Cardiff International Sports Village.
- Queen Alexandra Dock.

== Commercial and residential ==
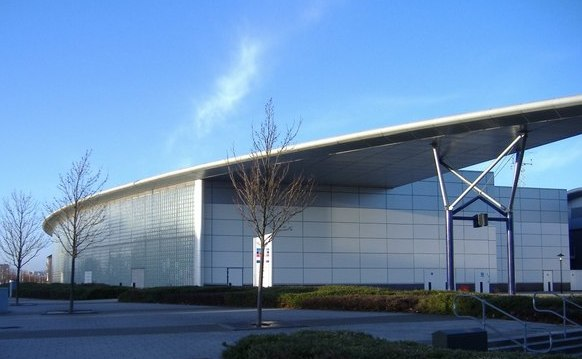
Red Dragon Centre, Cardiff Bay

- Style-conscious shops, bars and restaurants at Mermaid Quay
- Cardiff Bay Retail Park
- The Coal Exchange, formally a music venue, now a hotel, bar and restaurant
- Cardiff International Sports Village, which includes Ice Arena Wales and Cardiff International Pool
- The Red Dragon Centre (formerly Atlantic Wharf Leisure Village), a leisure and entertainment complex

== Appearances in the media ==
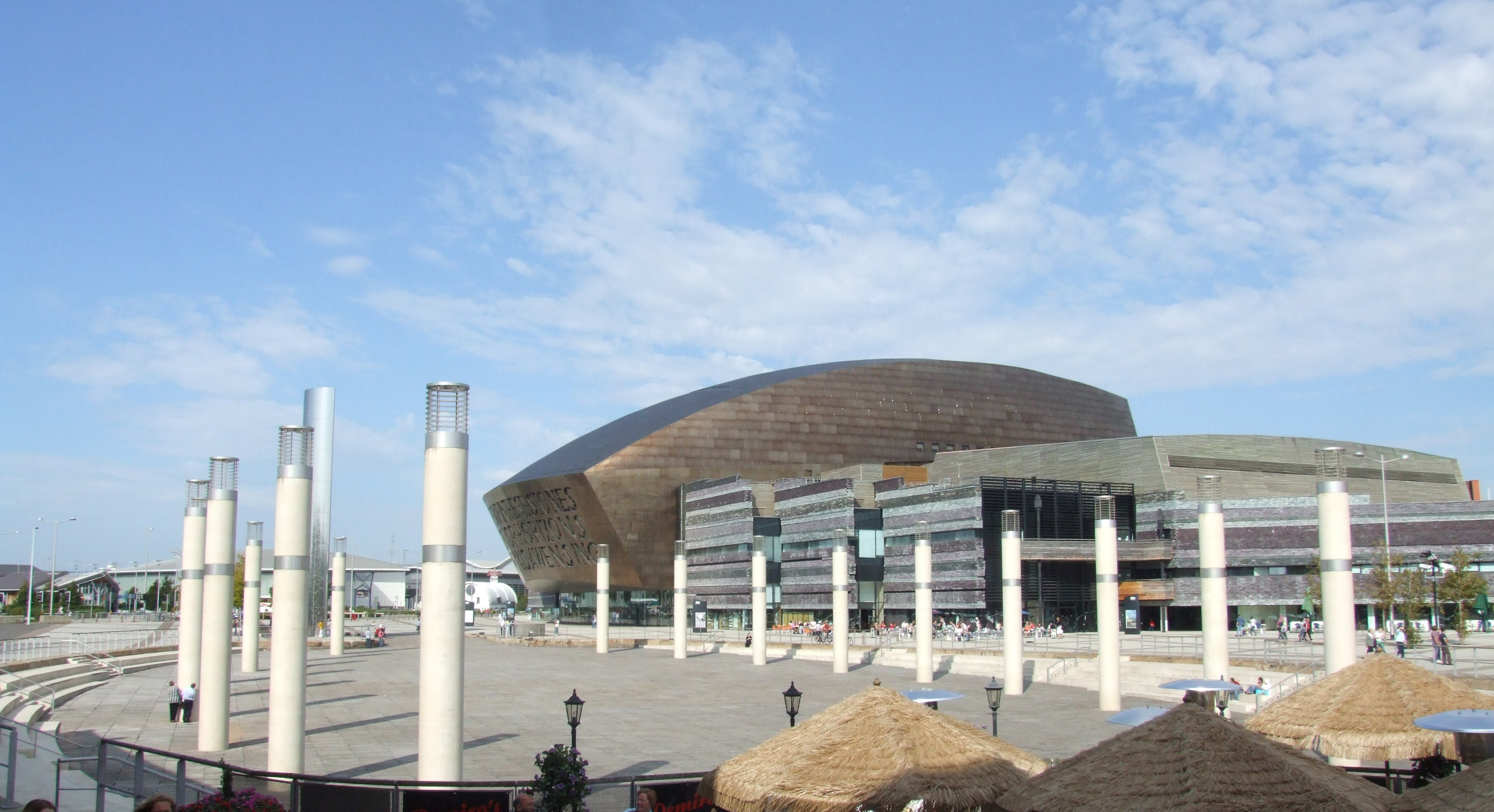
Roald Dahl Plass and the Wales Millennium Centre are often used in external shots of the Torchwood Hub in Doctor Who and Torchwood.

Cardiff Bay was used as the high-tech urban setting for the Doctor Who episode "Boom Town" and the show's spinoff, Torchwood, whose makers deliberately avoided stereotypical portrayals of Wales in order to portray Cardiff as the modern urban centre it is today. In Torchwood series, there is a giant secret base underneath the bay, named "The Hub", from where the Torchwood team works. There is also a lift from the hub into the plaza with a perception filter making anyone who stands on the spot "not noticed". In the third series of Torchwood entitled "Children Of Earth", Cardiff Bay was the centre of a bomb explosion, destroying the Torchwood Hub and Cardiff Bay. Roald Dahl Plass features prominently. In the episode "Utopia", the Plass is home to a rift that the Doctor uses to refuel his TARDIS. The Doctor Who episode "The Runaway Bride" made use of office buildings in Cardiff Bay.

== Transport ==
=== Metro and rail services ===
Cardiff Bay railway station is northeast of Mermaid Quay and is served by services to Cardiff Queen Street which run at a frequency of every 10 minutes, although the station is currently being upgraded with 2 extra platforms to allow new Metro services to Aberdare, Treherbert & Merthyr Tydfil to operate. These metro services are expected to begin in 2025, with a core frequency of every 5 minutes. Alongside this, three new metro stations are expected to open in the area by 2027, serving the areas around Porth Teigr, Roath Lock, and the Senedd building.

=== Bus services ===
Cardiff Bus operates the following services to the bay:

- 1 – Bay Circle clockwise: Grangetown-Leckwith-Canton-Fairwater-Llandaff-Gabalfa-Heath-Penylan-Roath-Tremorfa-Central Station
- 2 – Bay Circle anticlockwise: as above but reversed
- 6 – Baycar: Queen Street station via Central Station
- 8 – City Centre via Grangetown
- 11 – Pengam Green via Central Station and Tremorfa
- 35/36 – Gabalfa via Central Station, Cathays and Heath

=== Roads and cycling ===
The bay lies off the A4232 before the Butetown tunnels and is linked to the city centre by Lloyd George Avenue, Bute Street and the Central Link Road.

The Pont y Werin pedestrian and cycle bridge opened in July 2010, completing a six and a half-mile circular route around Cardiff Bay and Penarth.

A cycle hire system, similar to those in other large cities, launched in September 2009, and includes 70 bikes and 35 hire points (initially seven) around the centre and the south of the city. The current stations are: Central Station; Cardiff Bay Station; County Hall; Cardiff Bay Visitors’ Centre; Churchill Way; City Hall and eastern Queen Street. It is necessary to register before using bike. The first half an hour is free after which a small hourly fee is payable.

== Gallery ==
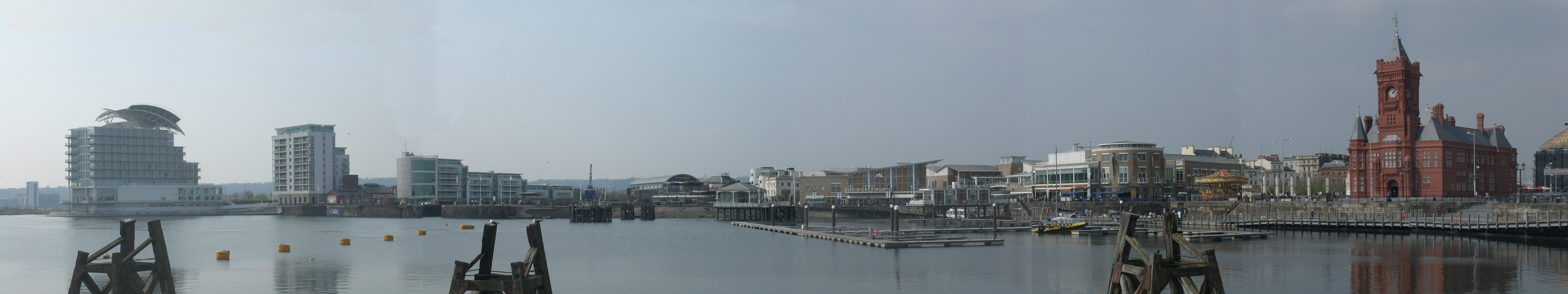
Panorama of the Cardiff Bay in March 2008
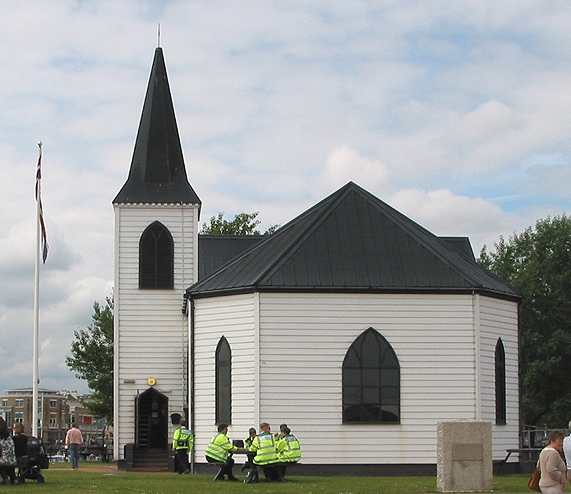
Side view of the Norwegian Church

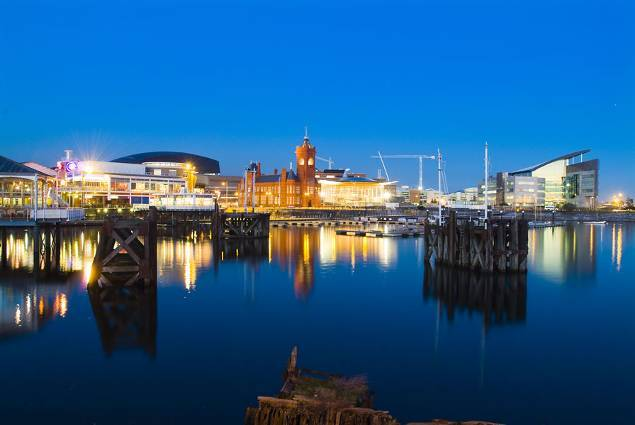
Cardiff Bay at night

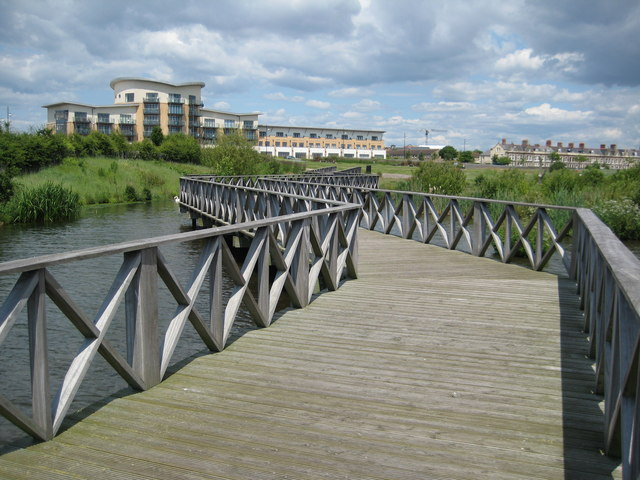
Wetlands walkway in Cardiff Bay

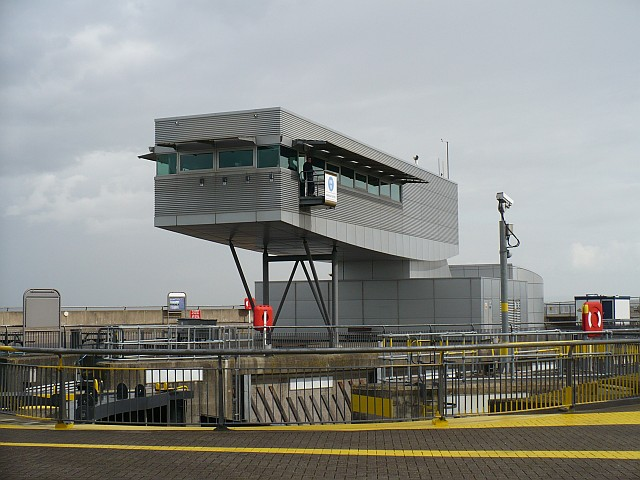
Cardiff Bay Barrage Control Building

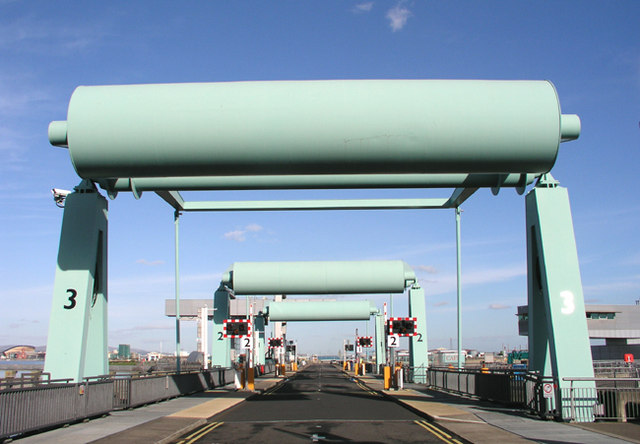
Three Bascule Bridges, Cardiff Bay Barrage

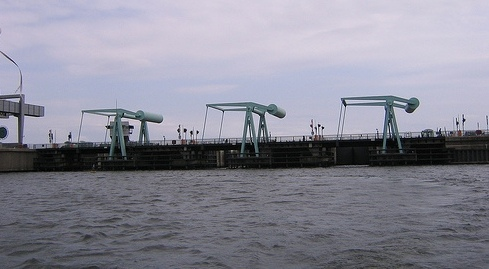
View of Cardiff barrage at sea

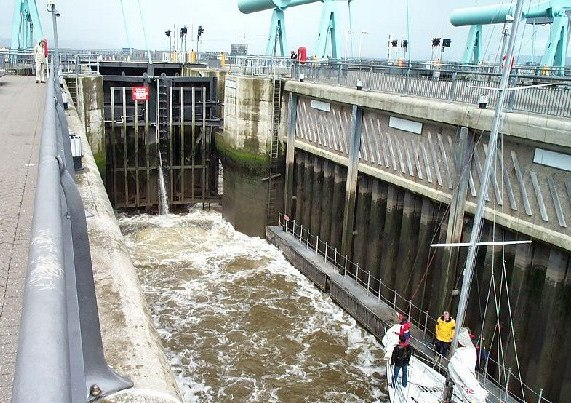
Cardiff Bay Barrage lock in use

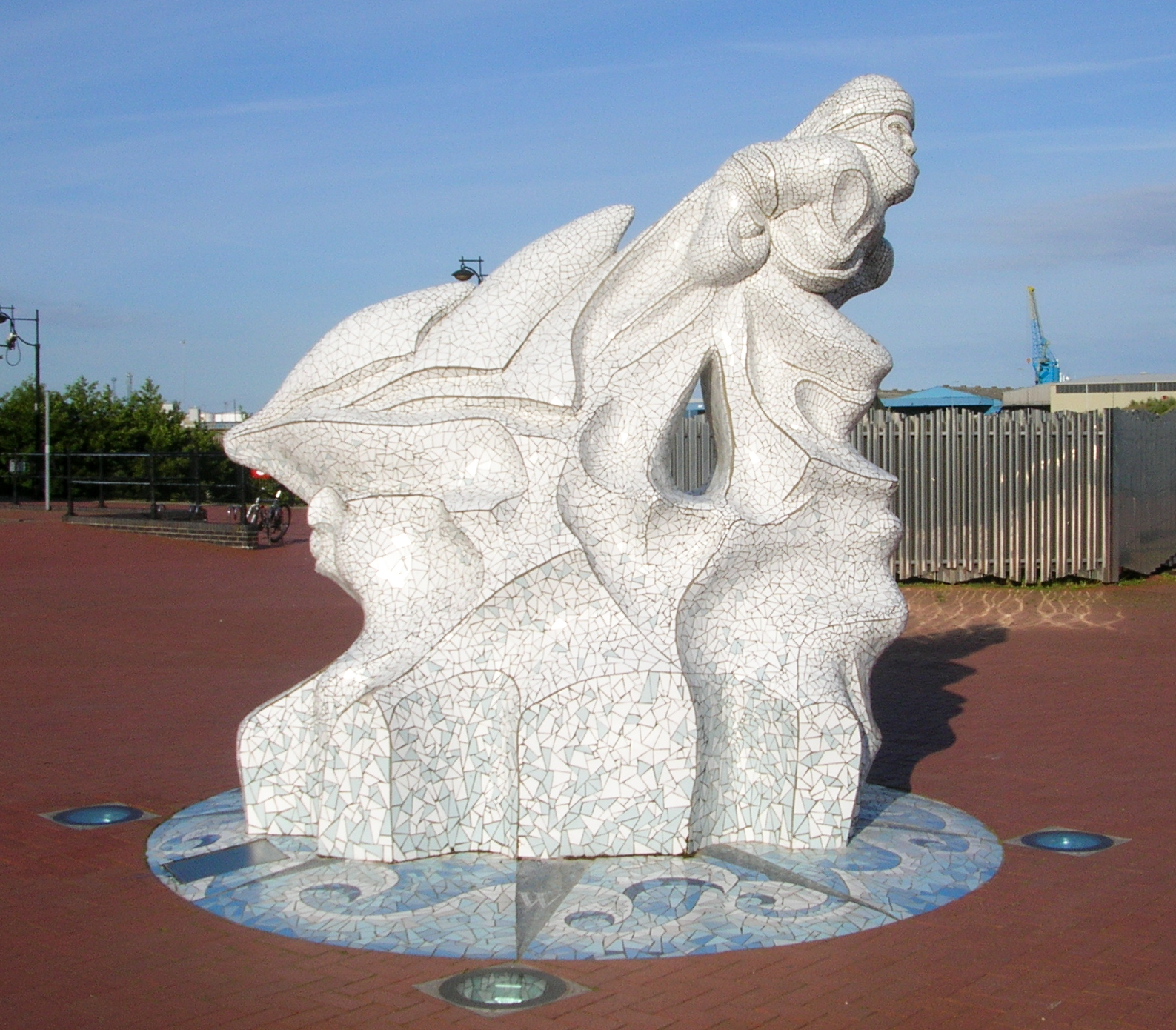
Sculpture by Jonathan Williams depicting Captain Scott, outside the Norwegian Church

== See also ==
- Butetown
- List of places in Cardiff
- Penarth Marina
- Tiger Bay
- Barry Waterfront
