= Cardiff Bay Development Corporation =

Former development body in Wales

- Formation: 1987
- Dissolved: 2000
- Headquarters: Cardiff
- Official language: English and Welsh
- Chair: Sir Geoffrey Inkin
- Chief executive: Barry Lane; Michael Boyce

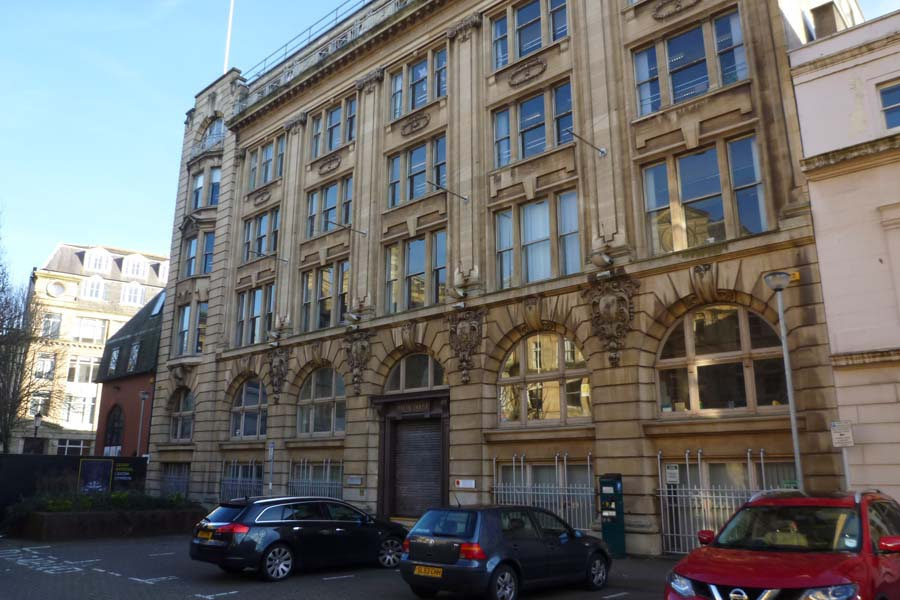
Corporation's headquarters in Cardiff

The Cardiff Bay Development Corporation was established in 1987 to redevelop the dockland area of Cardiff and to create Cardiff Bay.

== History ==
The corporation was established as part of an initiative by the future Deputy Prime Minister, Michael Heseltine, in April 1987, during the Second Thatcher ministry.

The Secretary of State for Wales, Nicholas Edwards set out the CBDC's mission statement as:

To put Cardiff on the international map as a superlative maritime city which will stand comparison with any such city in the world, thereby enhancing the image and economic well-being of Cardiff and Wales as a whole.

The five main aims and objectives were:

- To promote development and provide a superb environment in which people will want to live, work and play.
- To re-unite the City of Cardiff with its waterfront.
- To bring forward a mix of development which would create a wide range of job opportunities and would reflect the hopes and aspirations of the communities of the area.
- To achieve the highest standard of design and quality in all types of development and investment.
- To establish the area as a recognized centre of excellence and innovation in the field of urban regeneration.

Its flagship developments included the Cardiff Bay Barrage, the Cardiff Bay Retail Park, and the Roald Dahl Plass development. During the CBDC's lifetime 14,000,000 square feet (1,300,000 m^{2}) of non-housing development and 5,780 housing units were built. Around 31,000 new jobs were created and some £1.8 billion of private finance was invested. About 200 acres (81 ha) of derelict land was reclaimed.

The Chairman was Sir Geoffrey Inkin. The first Chief Executive was Barry Lane, who was later succeeded by Michael Boyce.

The corporation was dissolved on 31 March 2000. The Cardiff Harbour Authority took over the corporation's management of the barrage, the Inland Bay and the Rivers Taff and Ely on 1 April 2000.

An evaluation of the regeneration of Cardiff Bay published in 2004 concluded that the project had "reinforced the competitive position of Cardiff" and "contributed to a massive improvement in the quality of the built environment". However, the regeneration project had been less successful in generating employment. The evaluation concluded that "the overall outcome, while representing a major achievement and massive step forward, falls short of the original vision."
