= Cardiff Bay Barrage =

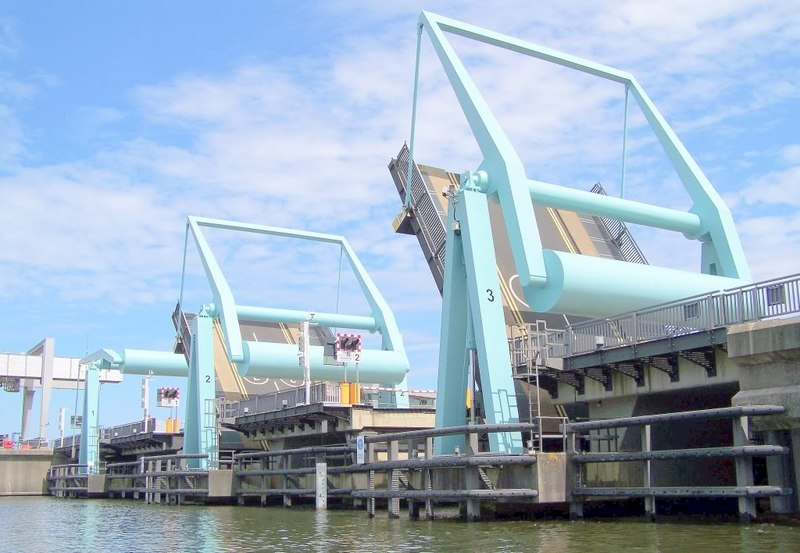
- Bascule Bridges
- Interactive map of Cardiff Bay Barrage
- Official name: Cardiff Bay Barrage
- Country: United Kingdom
- Location: Cardiff, Wales
- Coordinates: 51.44812°N 3.1647°W
- Status: Operational
- Construction began: 1994
- Opening date: 2001
- Construction cost: £120m
- Owner: Welsh Government
- Operator: Cardiff Harbour Authority

Dam and spillways
- Type of dam: Barrage
- Impounds: Cardiff Bay
- Height: 7.96 m (26.1 ft)
- Length: 1.1 km (0.68 mi)
- Spillways: 5
- Spillway type: Controlled
- Spillway capacity: 2,250 m^{3}/s (79,000 cu ft/s)

Reservoir
- Creates: Cardiff Bay
- Surface area: 200 hectares (490 acres)
- Normal elevation: 4.5 m (15 ft) OD

Cardiff Bay Barrage (Welsh: Morglawdd Bae Caerdydd) lies across the mouth of Cardiff Bay, Wales between Queen Alexandra Dock and Penarth Head. It was one of the largest civil engineering projects in Europe during construction in the 1990s.

== History ==
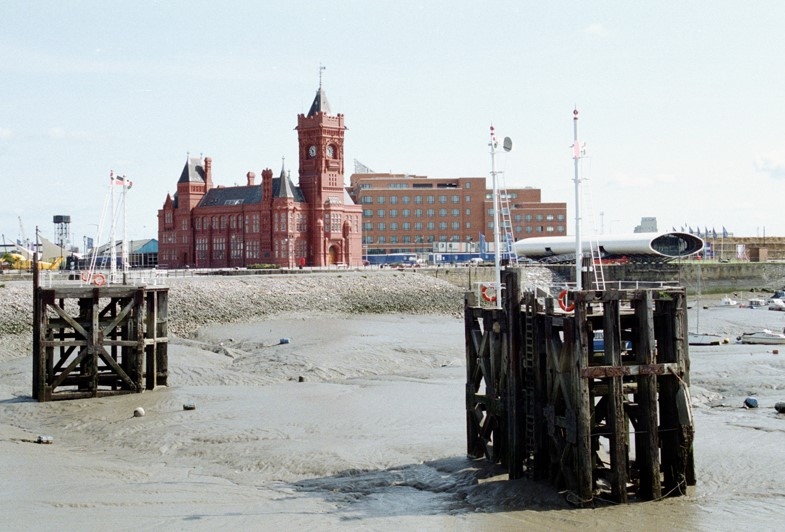
The mudflats exposed at low tide, before the construction of the barrage

=== Origin ===
The origin of the scheme dates back to a visit by Nicholas Edwards, the Secretary of State for Wales, to the largely-derelict Cardiff docklands in the early 1980s. An avid opera enthusiast, Edwards envisaged a scheme to revitalise the area incorporating new homes, shops, restaurants and, as a centrepiece, an opera house at the waterside. However the tidal nature of Cardiff Bay, exposing extensive mudflats save for two hours either side of high water, was seen as aesthetically unappealing.

Edwards credited the solution to this perceived problem to a Welsh Office civil servant, Freddie Watson. Watson proposed building a barrage stretching across the mouth of Cardiff Bay from Cardiff Docks to Penarth, which would impound freshwater from the rivers Ely and Taff to create a large freshwater lake, thus providing permanent high water. By making the area more appealing, investment was to be attracted to the docklands.

The development was also inspired by the redevelopment of Baltimore Inner Harbor in the US, where a largely derelict port area was transformed into a thriving commercial district and tourist attraction.

The barrage was consequently seen as central to the regeneration project. In 1987, prior to approval of the construction of the barrage, the Cardiff Bay Development Corporation was established to proceed with redeveloping the docklands.

=== Completion ===
In November 1999, the barrage was completed, with the sluice gates closed at high water, to retain the seawater from the Bristol Channel within the 500 acre (200 hectare) bay.

== Water quality ==
Oxygenation systems (based on those used at the Swansea Barrage) were installed which improved water quality and allowed the composition of the bay to become entirely freshwater, the only saltwater ingress being that from the three locks providing access to and from the Severn estuary for the proliferating number of boats using Cardiff Bay. This salt water sinks to the bottom of the bay which is then sucked back out to sea via a drainage basin connected to a salt water shaft.

The barrage was opened to the public in 2001.

== Opposition ==
The barrage scheme was opposed by environmentalists and, according to a BBC investigation, by the Prime Minister Margaret Thatcher. Treasury officials had queried the economic case for the development and the economic methodology used to justify it. In 1990, a select committee, which had been unable to examine all economic details it wanted, voted 3–1 in favour of the scheme. Subsequently, BBC Wales discovered that Thatcher wanted to scrap the barrage proposal until Edwards threatened to resign.

Opposition to the project also came from many other quarters. One of the most prominent critics was the then Cardiff West Member of Parliament (MP), Rhodri Morgan (Labour), who was later to become First Minister of the Welsh Assembly. Morgan, like Thatcher, said that the scheme would cost too much money. It was reported by the Daily Mirror in March 2000 that the costs of the barrage construction alone had risen to £400 million, and there would be additional £12 million a year charge for maintenance and operation. Morgan said, "This is far higher than was ever identified to Parliament during the passage of the Barrage Bill".

In the meantime, local residents living near the edge of the bay and the banks of River Taff feared that their homes would be damaged by the permanently raised water level, as they had been in several previous floods. Environmental groups strongly opposed construction because the bay was an important feeding ground for birds, which would be lost following impoundment. Concerns were also raised over groundwater levels in low-lying areas of Cardiff possibly affecting cellars and underground electrical junctions.

During the development of Cardiff Bay and of the Cardiff Bay Barrage, there was constant tension between the Cardiff Bay Development Corporation and Cardiff City Council (later Cardiff County Council). The National Assembly's Audit Committee spoke of a "fractured working relationship" between the two bodies. After the original impoundment of the waters of Cardiff Bay in November 1999 plans were mooted for a Royal inauguration of the barrage. That, it was envisaged, would be held on St David's Day 2000 to be attended by the Queen and Morgan, a vociferous opponent of the scheme. In the event, no such event took place. On 1 March 2000, the day scheduled for the ceremony, the National Assembly of Wales announced that there would be no special ceremony held to mark the project.

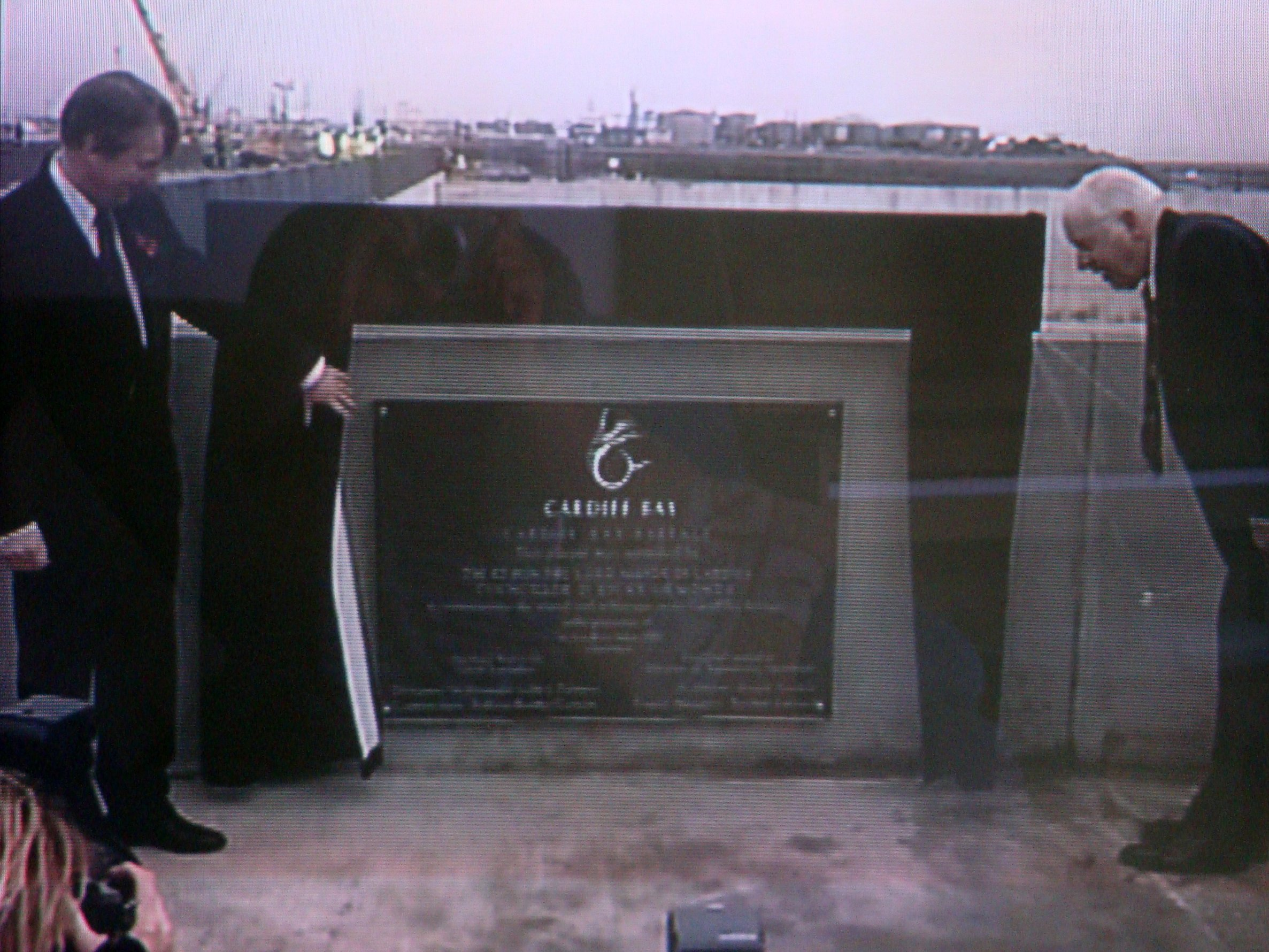
Low-key inauguration ceremony of Cardiff Bay Barrage November 1999

In place of an official Royal inauguration of this massive civil engineering scheme, the largest of its kind in Europe, a modest ceremony was arranged by Cardiff Bay Development Corporation at which a former Lord Mayor of Cardiff, Councillor Ricky Ormonde (who had served as Lord Mayor in 1994) officiated along with Alun Michael Labour and Co-operative MP for Cardiff South and Penarth who had always supported the scheme. However, as Cardiff Council would not accommodate the installation of a commemorative plaque on their land, the ceremony had to be performed and the plaque unveiled on land owned by the adjacent local authority, the Vale of Glamorgan Council at the Penarth end of the barrage. That was also the site chosen for the installation of a 7-foot tall bronze figure of a mermaid – which was the logo of Cardiff Bay Development Corporation. (The logo had been designed by Cardiff graphics artist Roger Fickling.)

The Cardiff Bay Development Corporation was wound up on 31 March 2000, handing over control of the completed project to Cardiff Council. Soon afterwards the plaque at the Penarth end of the barrage was removed and an entirely new plaque erected midway along the barrage. The new plaque made no mention of Cardiff Bay Development Authority. The bronze figure of the CBDC symbol of the mermaid, however, remained on the roundabout, at the entrance to the Penarth end of the barrage.

== Construction ==
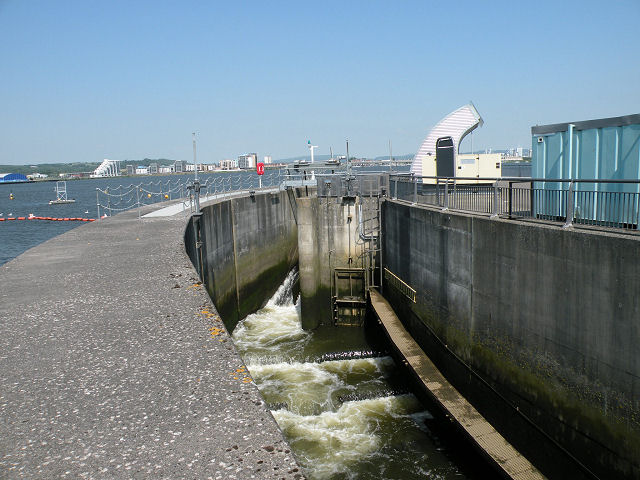
The fish pass on the barrage

Construction was undertaken by a Balfour Beatty / Costain Joint Venture. The electrical and control systems equipment was designed, installed and commissioned by Lintott Control Systems (Norwich). Construction started in 1994, following the successful passage of the Cardiff Bay Barrage Act 1993 through the UK Parliament. The bill included provisions for compensation for any homes damaged by the barrage and a large wetland habitat for birds further east down the Bristol Channel. Features include a fish pass to allow salmon to reach breeding grounds in the River Taff and three locks for maritime traffic. Construction was completed in 1999 and shortly afterwards the barrage came into effect. The impounding of the River Taff and River Ely created a 2-square-kilometre (490-acre) freshwater lake.

== Today ==
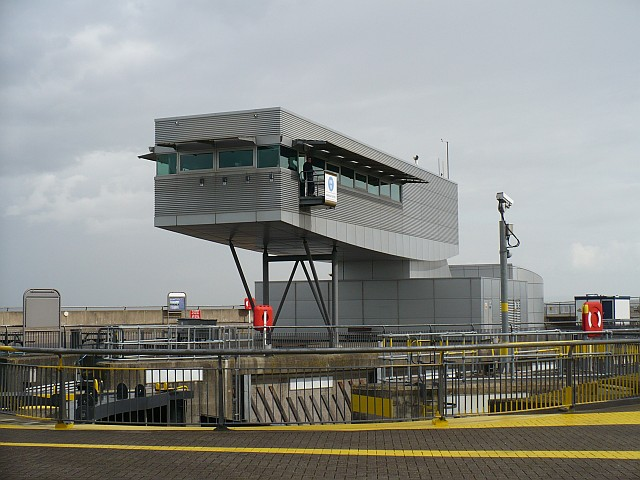
Cardiff Bay Barrage Control building.

The barrage has played an important role in the regeneration of the area. Attractions such as the Wales Millennium Centre, The Senedd, shopping and watersports have since moved onto the waterfront. In 2000 the Cardiff Bay Development Corporation was dissolved, and the Welsh Assembly awarded a contract to Cardiff County Council to manage the barrage, as Cardiff Harbour Authority (CHA).

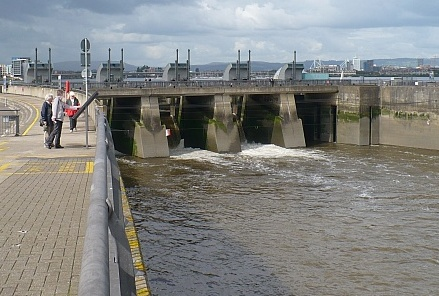
The seaward side of the sluices at Cardiff Bay Barrage

One of the major selling points of the proposed development was the opening up of a new pedestrian and cycle route across the barrage. This would not only enhance tourism on both sides but provide a pleasant and safe short-cut between Cardiff and Penarth, cutting two miles off the journey otherwise taken on the heavy-traffic roads further upstream. However, this benefit took years to materialise due to a lack of agreement between the derelict access land owners (Associated British Ports) and Cardiff Council. Cardiff Harbour Authority made significant progress in the creation of the bay edge walkway and have redeveloped a large portion of the previously inaccessible bay periphery and the bay edge walkway was finally completed and open to the public on Monday 30 June 2008, allowing public access from Mermaid Quay to Penarth Marina. The CHA has developed a Sea Angling zone on the outer breakwater arm.

The Cardiff Bay Barrage has won awards as a feat of engineering from the British Construction Industry and achieved the Institution of Civil Engineers Brunel Medal.

=== Artwork ===
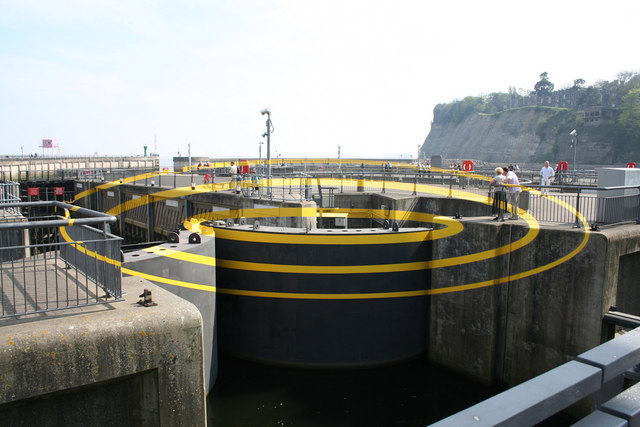
3 Ellipses for 3 Locks

The Cardiff Bay Arts Trust (CBAT), now known as Safle, commissioned Swiss artist Felice Varini to produce a piece of public art for the CHA, entitled 3 Ellipses for 3 Locks. It cost £25,000 and was produced between 11 and 25 March 2007. Three yellow ellipses were painted onto locks and gates, with professional mountain climbers being used to access the barrage's more difficult sections. It was Varini's first work in Wales and the UK and took a year to plan.

The bronze mermaid which stands on the roundabout at the Penarth end of the barrage was designed by Cardiff graphics artist Roger Fickling and comprised the official logo of the Cardiff Bay Development Corporation. It was installed on Vale of Glamorgan land because of tensions between the CBDC and Cardiff Council (see above).

=== Yacht clubs and marinas ===
There are two yacht clubs and three marinas associated with the barrage:

- Cardiff Bay Yacht Club – sited on the north side of the river between Cardiff and Penarth.
- Cardiff Yacht Club – situated centrally, near the main road bridge.
- Cardiff Marina – situated up-river of Cardiff Bay Yacht Club on the River Ely.
- Grangemoor Quay – Based higher up on the River Ely
- Penarth Marina – a development of a former commercial dock. The marina predated the barrage, so yachts need to pass through the marina's own locks as well as the barrage locks to reach the sea.

=== Motorsport ===
The barrage was used as a special stage during the 2010 Wales Rally GB.

== Impact on the ecology of the bay ==
=== Birds ===
According to two studies published in 2006, the loss of intertidal mudflats has resulted in the numbers and diversity of the birds using Cardiff Bay greatly reducing. Almost all of the common shelduck and shorebirds that used the bay when mud was exposed no longer feed there. Initially these birds used nearby sites to feed, but in most cases, this behaviour was not sustained, and the birds were unable to settle elsewhere. Common redshanks displaced from Cardiff Bay settled at the nearby Rhymney estuary, but they exhibited lower body weight, and their annual survival rate declined from 85% to 78% as a result of lower levels of winter survival.

=== Algae ===
The freshwater lake had problems with blue-green algae initially which made it impossible to swim in the water or participate in water sports. These issues have now largely been resolved though some toxic algae remain in some of the dock areas in the bay.

=== Zebra mussels ===
Cardiff Bay has become the first area of freshwater in Wales to be infested with zebra mussels – an alien species to the UK which multiplies rapidly to the detriment of native marine life. The Cardiff Harbour Authority has decreed that "Personal watercraft" used in Cardiff Bay such as kayaks, canoes and sailing dinghies must be washed down with bleach solution before being taken to any other area of freshwater.

== Views of the barrage ==
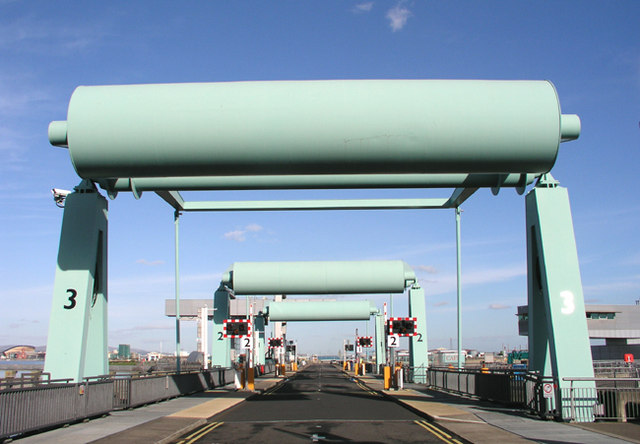

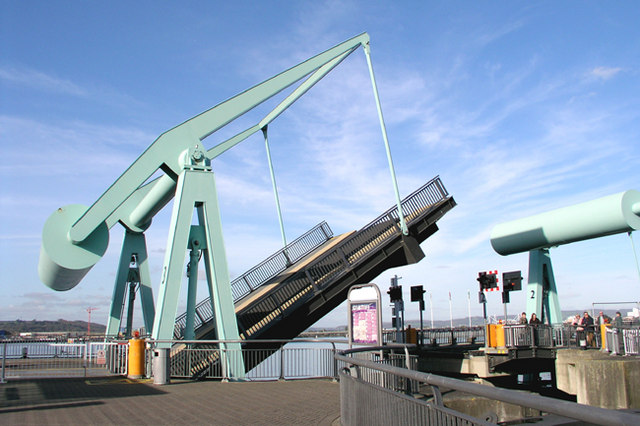

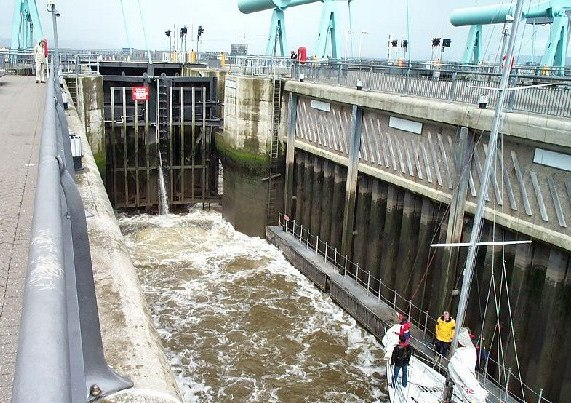

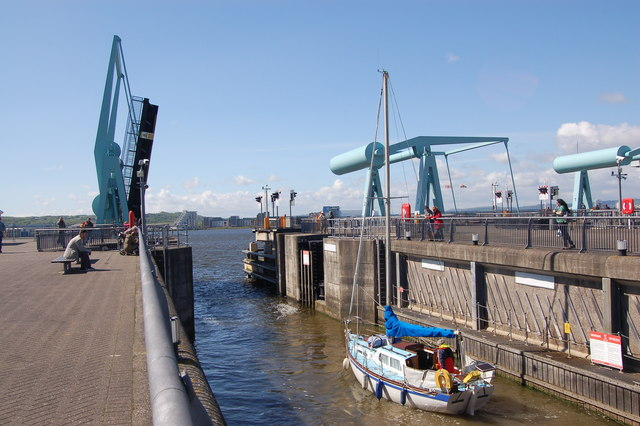

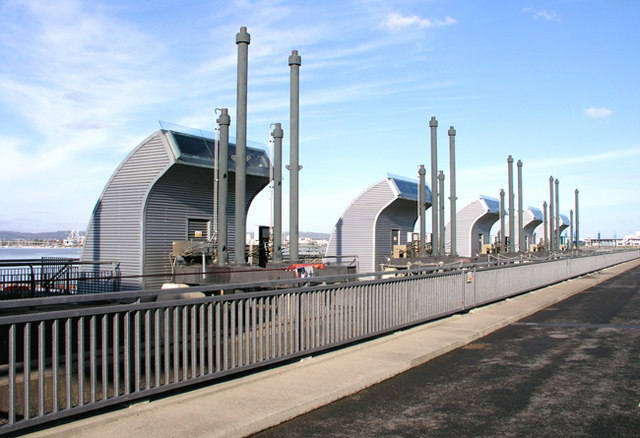

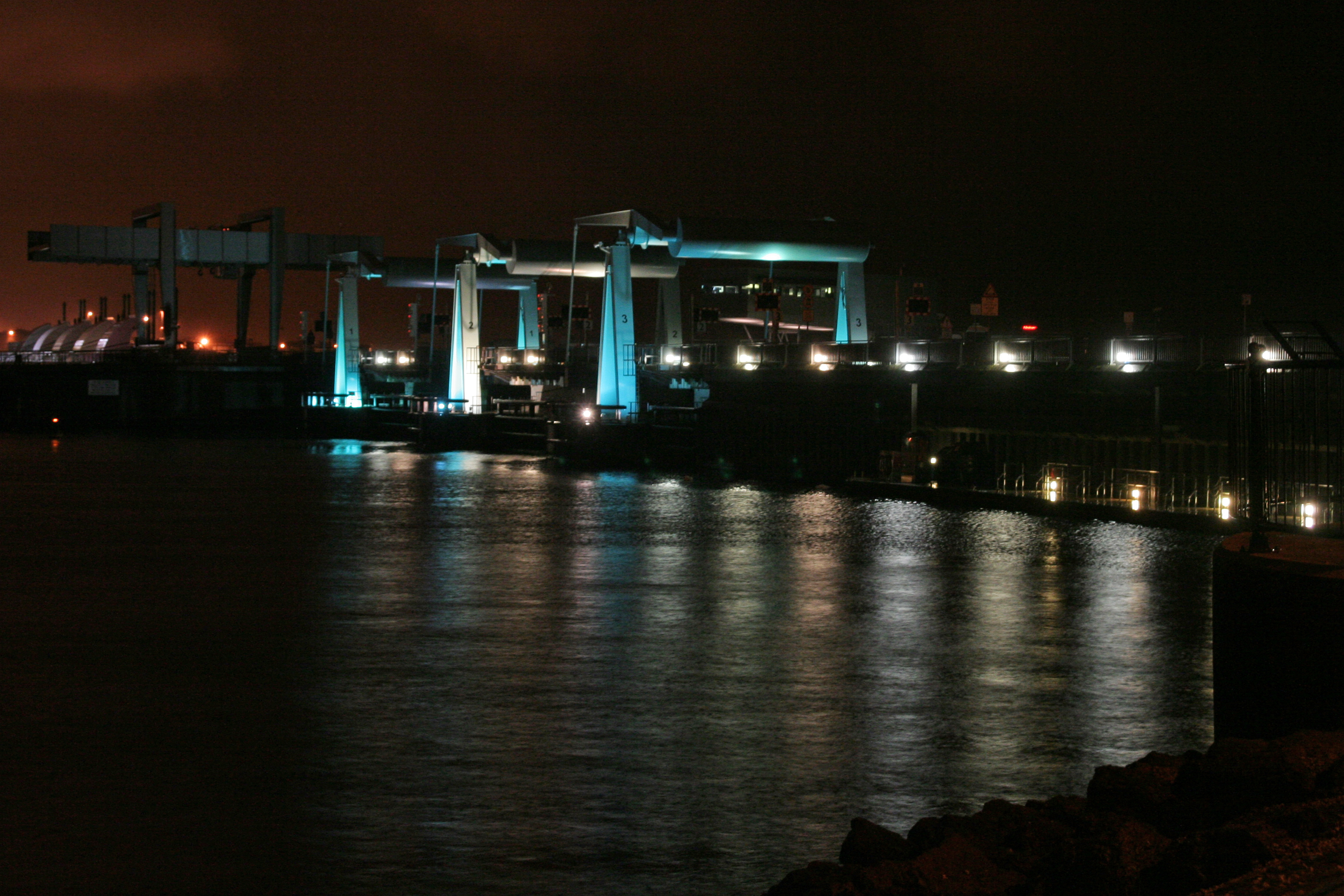

== See also ==
- Centre Port
- Severn Barrage
- Mersey Barrage
- Tidal Lagoon Swansea Bay
