= Geography of Cardiff =

The centre of Cardiff, the capital of Wales, is relatively flat and is bounded by hills on the outskirts to the east, north and west. Its geographic features were influential in its development as the world's largest coal port, most notably its proximity and easy access to the coal fields of the south Wales valleys.

== Geology ==
Cardiff is built on reclaimed marshland on a bed of Triassic stones; this reclaimed marshland stretches from Chepstow to the Ely Estuary, which is the natural boundary of Cardiff and the Vale of Glamorgan. Triassic landscapes of this part of the world are usually shallow and low-lying which accounts and explains the flatness of the centre of Cardiff. The classic Triassic marl, sand and conglomerate rocks are used predominantly throughout Cardiff as building materials. Many of these Triassic rocks have a purple complexion, especially the coastal marl found near Penarth. One of the Triassic rocks used in Cardiff is "Radyr Stone", a freestone which as its name suggests is quarried in the Radyr district. Cardiff has also imported some materials for buildings: Devonian sandstones (the Old Red Sandstone) from the Brecon Beacons has been used. Most famously, the buildings of Cathays Park, the civic centre in the centre of the city, are built of Portland stone which was imported from Dorset. A widely used building stone in Cardiff is the yellow-grey Liassic limestone rock of the Vale of Glamorgan, including the very rare "Sutton Stone", a conglomerate of lias limestone and carboniferous limestone.

== Topography ==
Cardiff's rivers

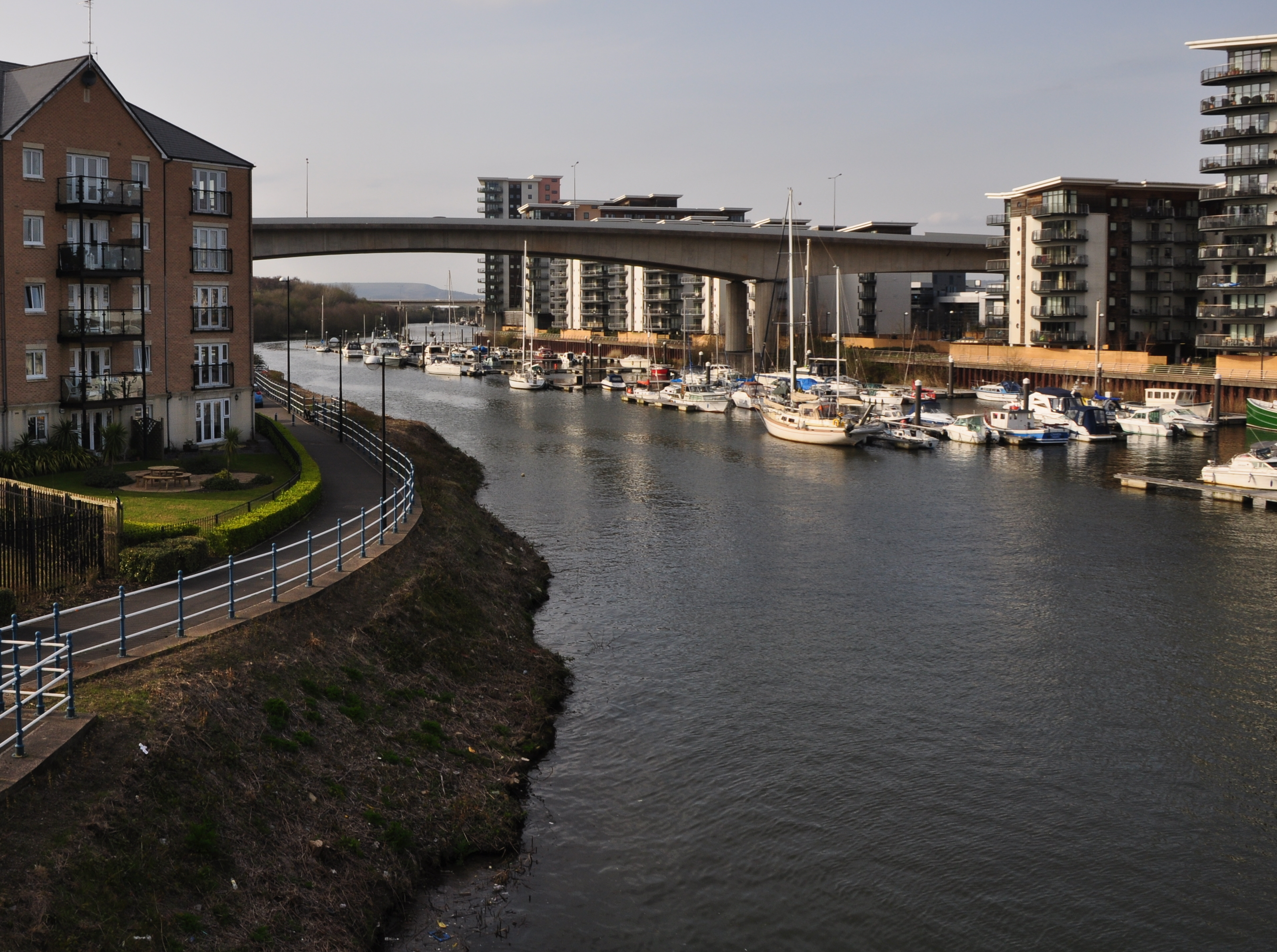
River Ely

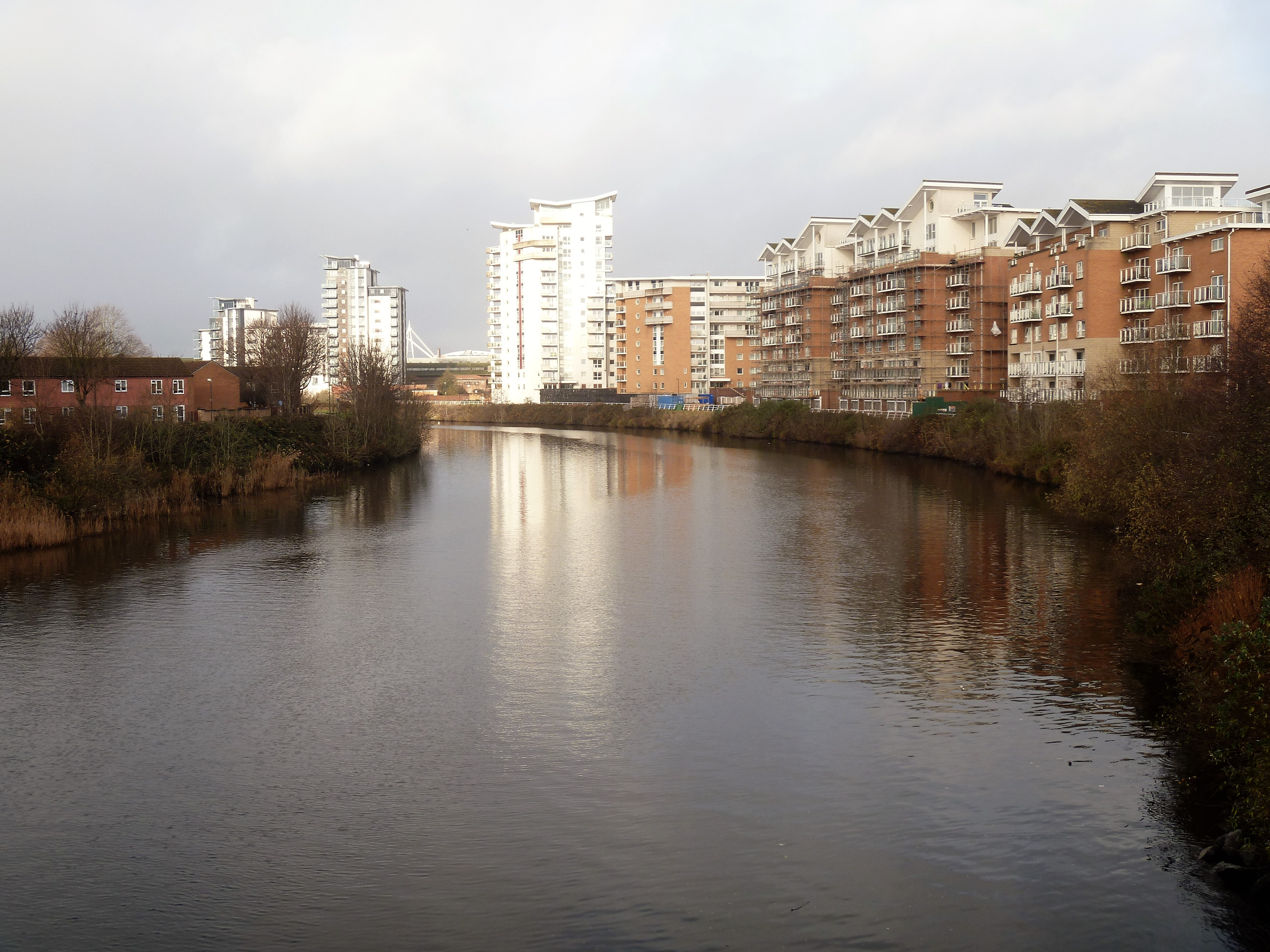
River Taff

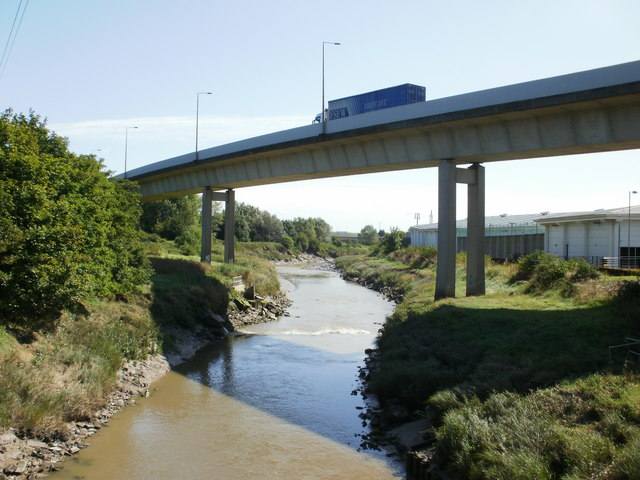
Rhymney River

Cardiff is bordered to the west by the rural district of the Vale of Glamorgan—also known as The Garden of Cardiff— to the east by the city of Newport, to the north by the South Wales Valleys and to the south by the Severn Estuary and Bristol Channel. The River Taff winds through the centre of the city and together with the River Ely flows into the freshwater lake of Cardiff Bay. A third river, the Rhymney flows through the east of the city entering directly into the Severn Estuary.

The stretch of coast west of Cardiff, which has reefs, sandbanks and serrated cliffs, was a ship graveyard; ships sailing up to Cardiff during the industrial era often never made it as far as Cardiff as many were wrecked around this hostile coastline during west/south-westerly gales. Consequently, smuggling, deliberate shipwrecking and attacks on ships were common.

== Cityscape ==
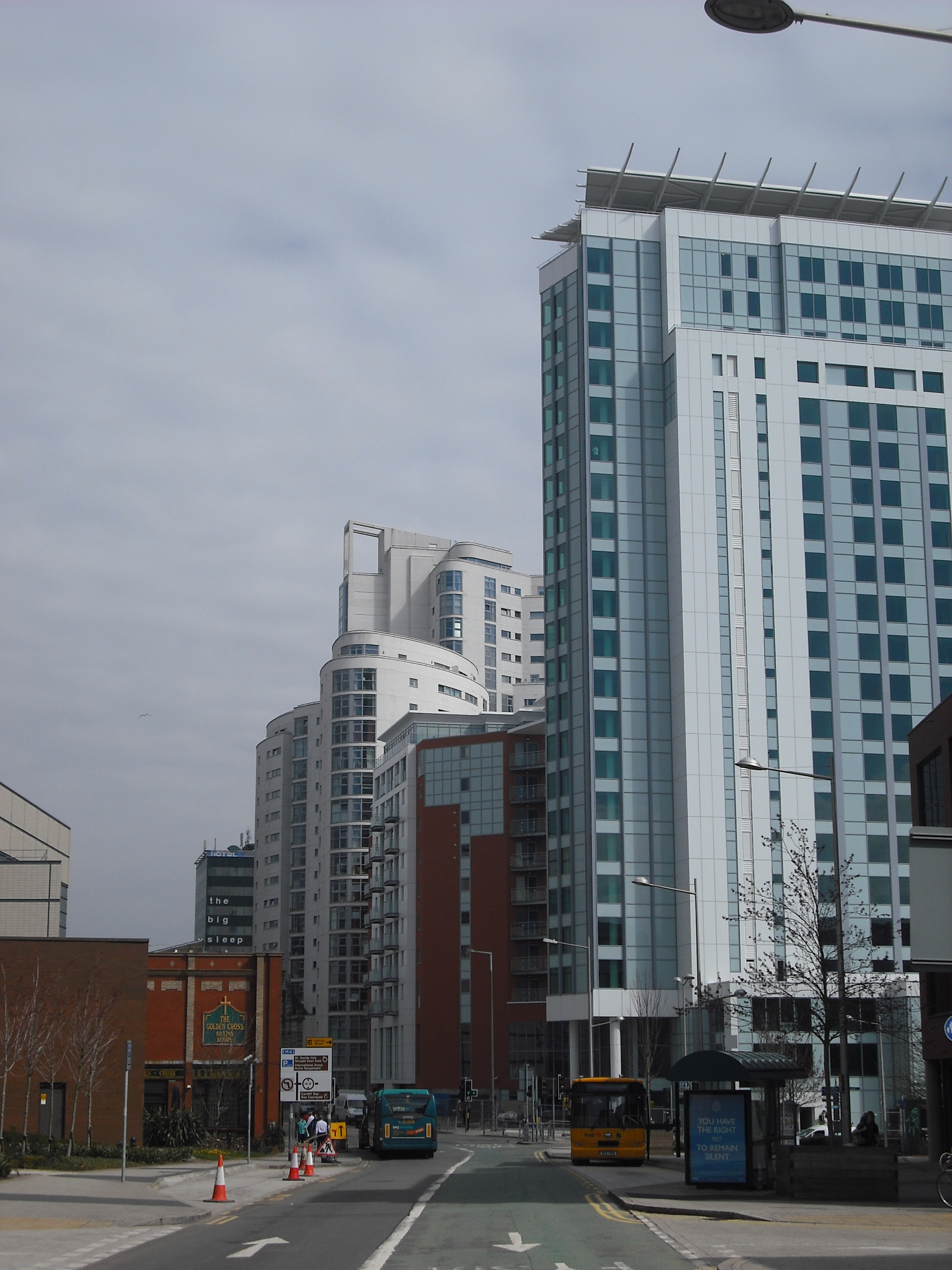
City centre apartment and hotel towers

"Inner Cardiff" consists of the following wards: Penylan, Plasnewydd, Gabalfa, Roath, Cathays, Adamsdown and Splott ward on the north and east of the city centre, and Butetown, Grangetown, Riverside and Canton to the south and west. The inner-city areas to the south of the A4161 road (known as the "Southern Arc") are, with the exception of Cardiff Bay, some of the poorest districts of Wales with low levels of economic activity. On the other hand, Gabalfa, Plasnewydd and Cathays north of the 'arc' have very large student populations, and Pontcanna (situated north of Riverside and alongside Canton) is a favourite for students and young professionals. Penylan, which lies to the north east side of Roath Park, is an affluent area popular with those with older children and the retired.

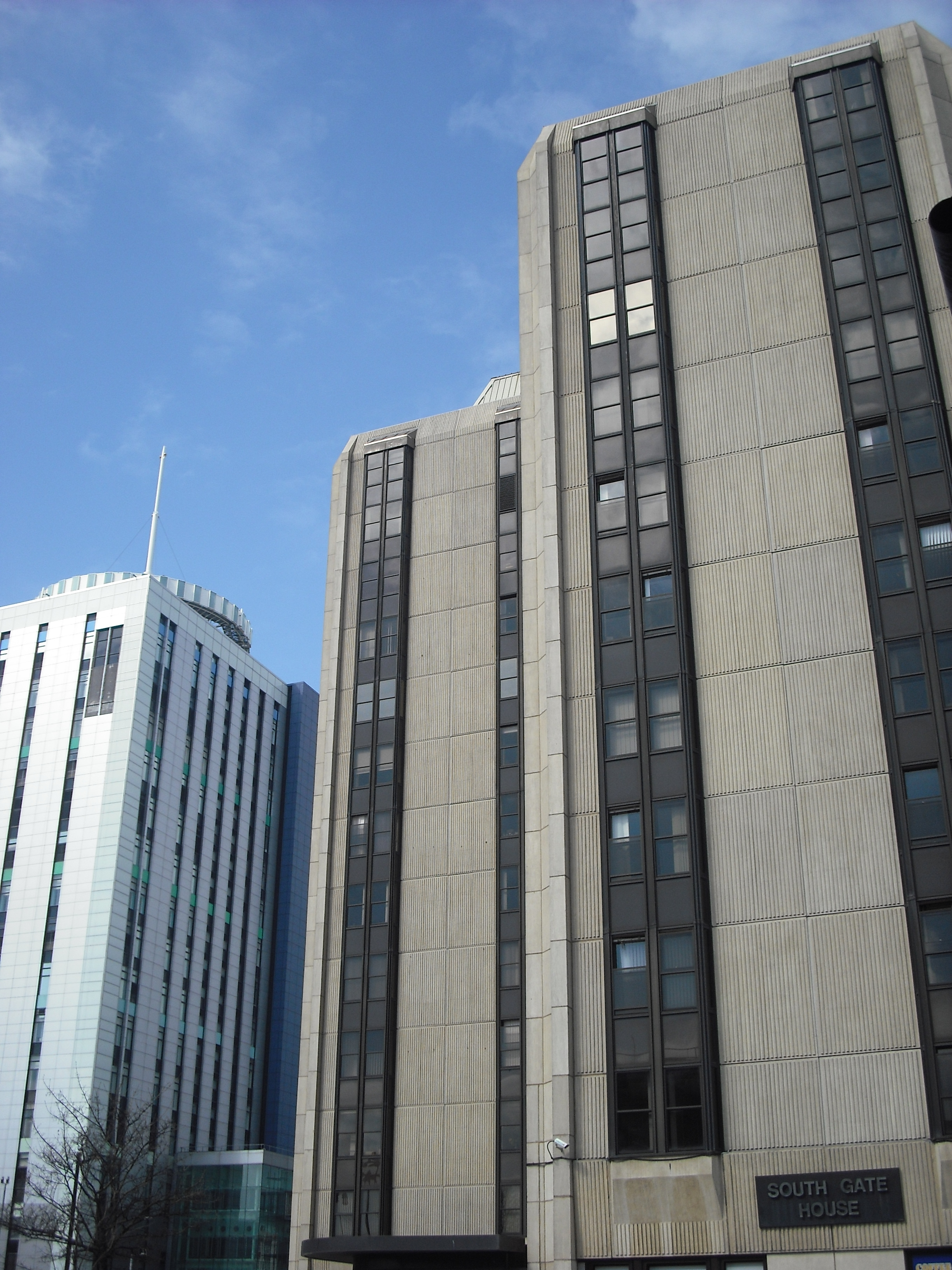
Stadium House and South Gate House

"Suburban Cardiff" can be broken down into three distinct areas. To the west lie Ely, Caerau and Fairwater which contain some of the largest housing estates in the United Kingdom. With the exception of some of the outlying privately built estates at Michaelston Super Ely and 1930s developments near Waun-Gron Road, this is an economically disadvantaged area with high numbers of unemployed households. Culverhouse Cross is a more affluent western area of the city. Radyr, Llandaff, Llandaff North, Whitchurch & Tongwynlais, Rhiwbina, Heath, Llanishen, Thornhill, Lisvane and Cyncoed which lie in an arc from the north west to the north east of the centre can be considered the main middle class suburbs of the city. In particular, Cyncoed, Radyr and Lisvane contain some of the most expensive housing in Wales. Further to the east lie the wards of Pontprennau & Old St Mellons, Rumney, Pentwyn, Llanrumney and Trowbridge. The latter three are again largely of public housing stock, although new private housing is being built in Trowbridge in considerable number. Pontprennau is the newest 'suburb' of Cardiff, whilst Old St Mellons has a history going back to the Norman Conquest in the 11th century.

To the north west of the city lies a region that may be called "Rural Cardiff" containing the villages of St. Fagans, Creigiau, Pentyrch, Tongwynlais and Gwaelod-y-garth. St. Fagans, home to the Museum of Welsh Life, is protected from further development.

Since 2000, there has been a significant change of scale and building height in Cardiff, with the development of the city centre's first purpose-built high-rise apartments. Tall buildings have been built in the city centre and Cardiff Bay, and more are planned. A luxury hotel, Bayscape, has been granted planning permission at the Cardiff International Sports Village and it will be the tallest building in Wales upon completion.

== Climate ==
Cardiff

Climate chart (precipitation, max. and min. temperature)
J	F	M	A	M	J	J	A	S	O	N	D
119 8 2	91 8 2	89 11 4	65 13 5	65 17 8	66 19 11	61 22 13	90 21 13	104 18 10	117 15 8	117 11 4	128 9 3
- █ Average max. and min. temperatures in °C
- █ Precipitation totals in mm
- Source: Met Office
Imperial conversion
J	F	M	A	M	J	J	A	S	O	N	D
4.7 46 36	3.6 46 36	3.5 52 39	2.6 55 41	2.6 63 46	2.6 66 52	2.4 72 55	3.5 70 55	4.1 64 50	4.6 59 46	4.6 52 39	5 48 37
- █ Average max. and min. temperatures in °F
- █ Precipitation totals in inches

Cardiff lies within the north temperate zone and has an essentially maritime climate, characterised by mild weather that is often cloudy, wet and windy. Summers tend to be warm and sunny, with average maximum temperatures between 19 °C (66 °F) and 22 °C (72 °F). Winters tend to be fairly wet, but rainfall is rarely excessive and the temperature usually stays above freezing. Spring and autumn feel quite similar and the temperatures tend to stay above 14 °C (57 °F)—also the average annual daytime temperature. Rain is unpredictable at any time of year, although the showers tend to be shorter in summer.

The northern part of the county, being higher and inland—e.g. The Garth (Welsh: Mynydd y Garth), about 7 miles (11 km) north west of Cardiff city centre, (elevation 1,007 feet (307 m))—tends to be cooler and wetter than the city centre.

=== Sunshine hours ===
Cardiff has 1518 hours of sunshine during an average year (Wales 1388.7 hours). Cardiff is sunniest during July, with an average 203.4 hours during the month (Wales 183.3 hours), and least sunny during December with 44.6 hours (Wales 38.5 hours).

=== Rainfall ===
Cardiff experiences less rainfall than Wales as a whole.

Rain falls in Cardiff on 146 days during an average year, with total annual rainfall of 1,111.7 millimetres (43.77 in). Monthly rainfall pattern shows that from September to January average monthly rainfall in Cardiff exceeded 100 millimetres (3.9 in) each month, the wettest month being December with 128 millimetres (5.0 in). Cardiff's dryest months are from April to July, with average monthly rainfall fairly consistent, at between 60.5 millimetres (2.38 in) and 65.9 millimetres (2.59 in).

Rain falls in Wales on 165.5 days during an average year, with total annual rainfall of 1,435.9 millimetres (56.53 in). Monthly rainfall pattern shows that from September to January average monthly rainfall in Wales exceeded 120.0 millimetres (4.72 in) each month, the wettest month being December with 173.3 millimetres (6.82 in) Wales' dryest months are from April to July, with average monthly rainfall fairly consistent, at between 78.4 millimetres (3.09 in) and 85.9 millimetres (3.38 in).
