= Cogan, Vale of Glamorgan =

Suburb of Penarth, Wales

Coordinates: 51.445°N 3.188°W

Cogan
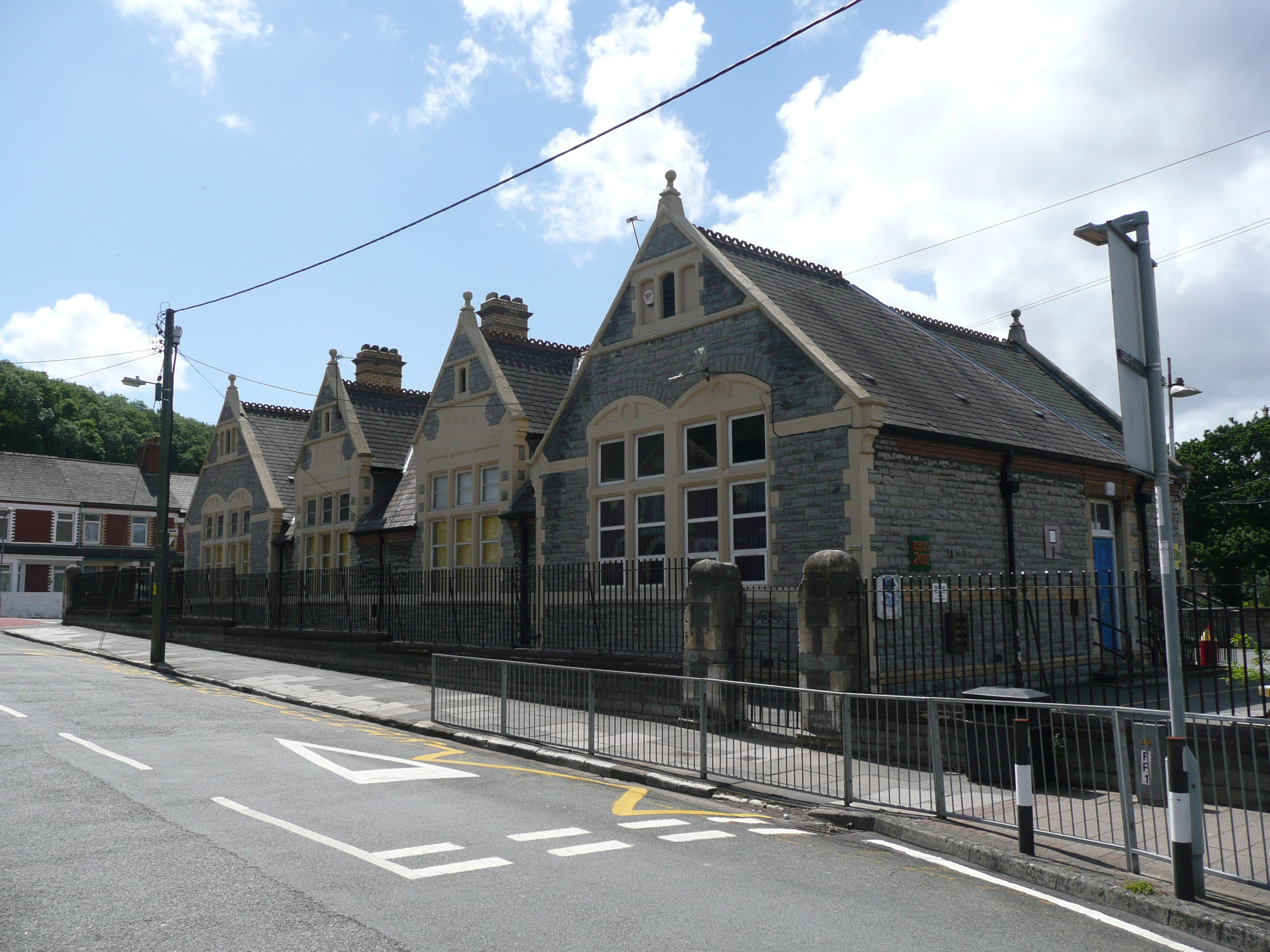
- Cogan Primary School

- Location within the Vale of Glamorgan
- OS grid reference: ST185715
- Principal area: Vale of Glamorgan
- Preserved county: South Glamorgan
- Country: Wales
- Sovereign state: United Kingdom
- Post town: PENARTH
- Postcode district: CF64
- Dialling code: +44-29
- Police: South Wales
- Fire: South Wales
- Ambulance: Welsh
- UK Parliament: Cardiff South & Penarth

Cogan is a suburb of Penarth in the Vale of Glamorgan, Wales, 2.5 miles (4 km) south of the centre of the Welsh capital city of Cardiff. Cogan contains one of the vale's four major leisure centres.

== History ==
Cogan is located in the ancient Cwmwd of Is Caeth in the Cantref of Brenhinol. Thomas Morgan derived the name from Gwgan, a personal name which he ascribes to a "celebrated Welsh personage".

=== Cogan Pill ===
The area that would become Cogan was known as Cogan Pill for much of its history. The pil (a tidal inlet, used as a harbour) lay within the commote of Dinas Powys and joined the River Ely near today's Pont y Werin footbridge.

The Pîl is no longer extant, having been developed into the Penarth Dock in the nineteenth century. The importance of the Pîl is, however, still evident by its impact on the local toponymy, with Pill Street, Cogan Pill Road and Cogan Pill House all being named after it.

=== Cogan Pill House ===
The Herbert Family Arms; Cogan Pill House was described as "The ancient seat of the Herberts", and the arms are still found in the modern building.

Maps of the Cogan area before the 1850s invariably mark the Cogan Pill and Cogan Pill House, but it is unclear when this house (now known as The Baron's Court) was first built. The historian David King suggested the site as a possible location for an earlier castle, but any early fortifications have yet to be identified. A house was certainly extant by the 1290s, when a weir (La Niwere, New wier) is recorded as forming the boundary of Cogan Moor, and a fishery is recorded as belonging to "The Lordship of Cogan" by 1492 at a place called Neke (The Neck/Nook).

The house is first mentioned in a will of 1531, but soon passed into the possession of the Herbert family. The house remained in the Herbert family for many generations, during which time it was enlarged and repurposed. The current Hall House still has many late 15th-century features, and a mid 16th-century rear wing. The Herbert family's arms are also still in situ, above the front porch.

By 1849, Cogan Pill House was recorded as "The ancient seat of the Herberts" but had been converted into a farmhouse (with the grand hall being used as a barn) sometime before. However, in the 1850s the house was acquired by an agent of the Marquess of Bute, and restored.

=== Industrial and modern Cogan ===
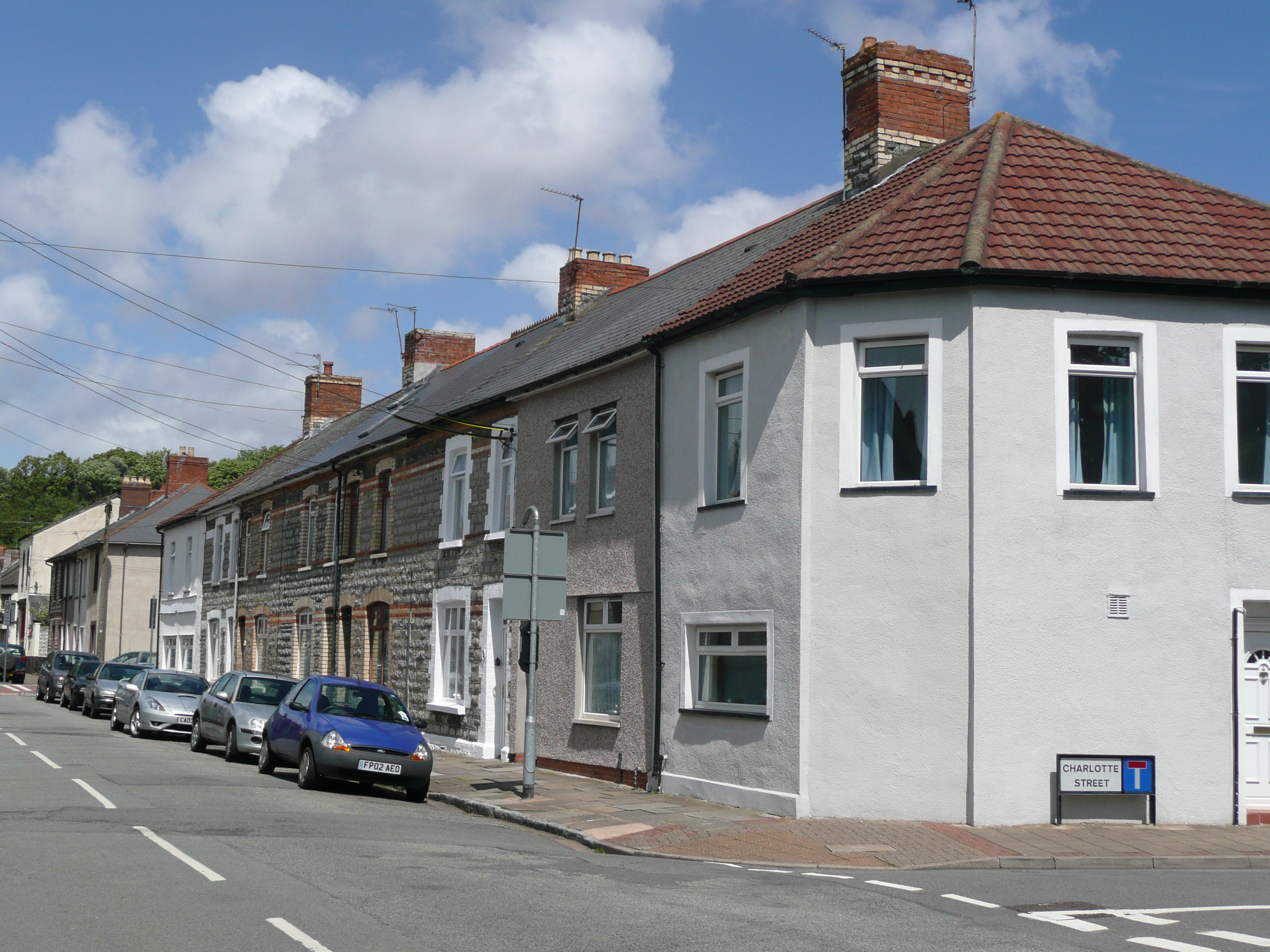
The corner houses with angled facings show where the many shops once stood, the angled wall once containing the shop entrance door

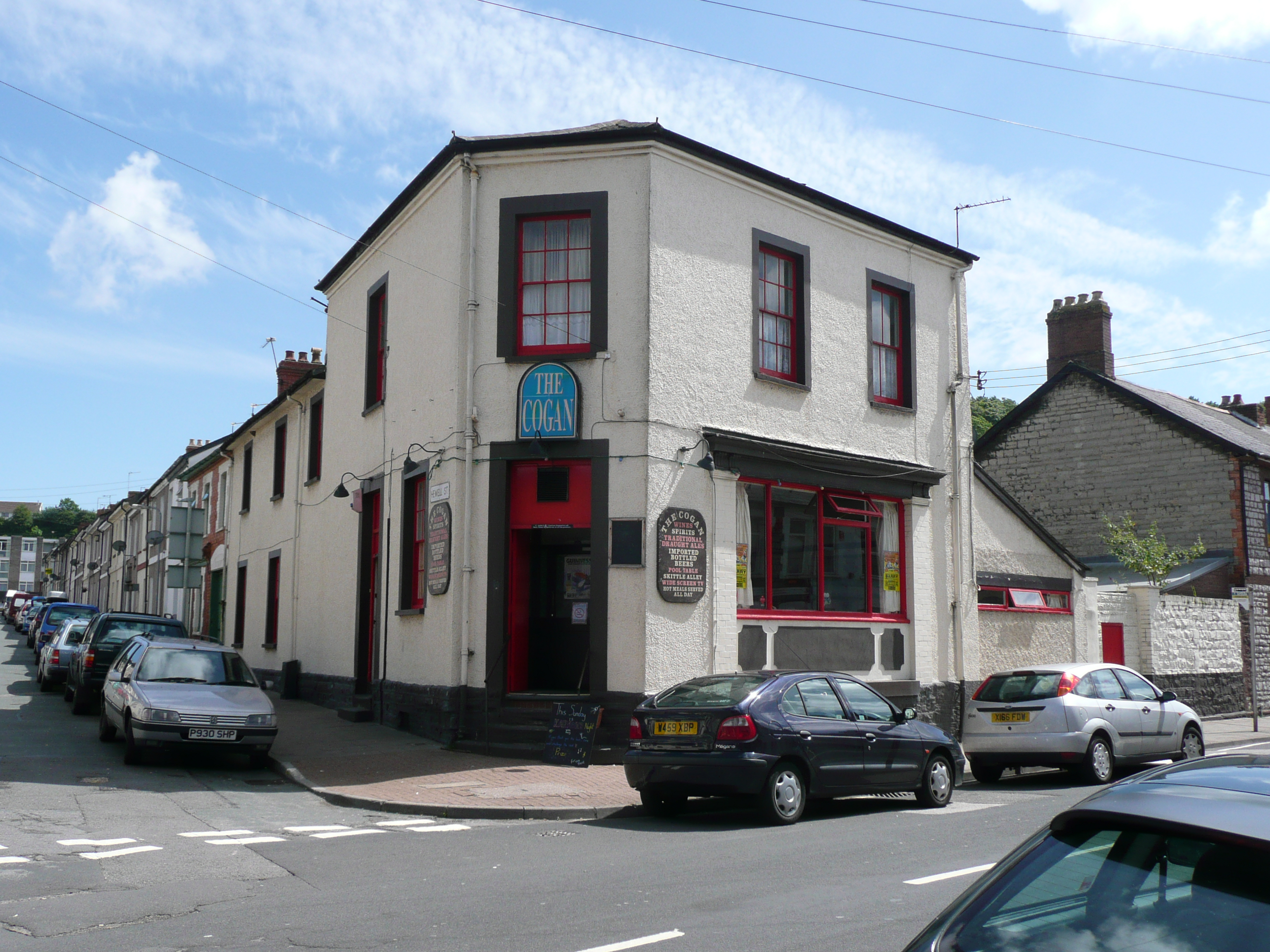
"The Cogan" public house

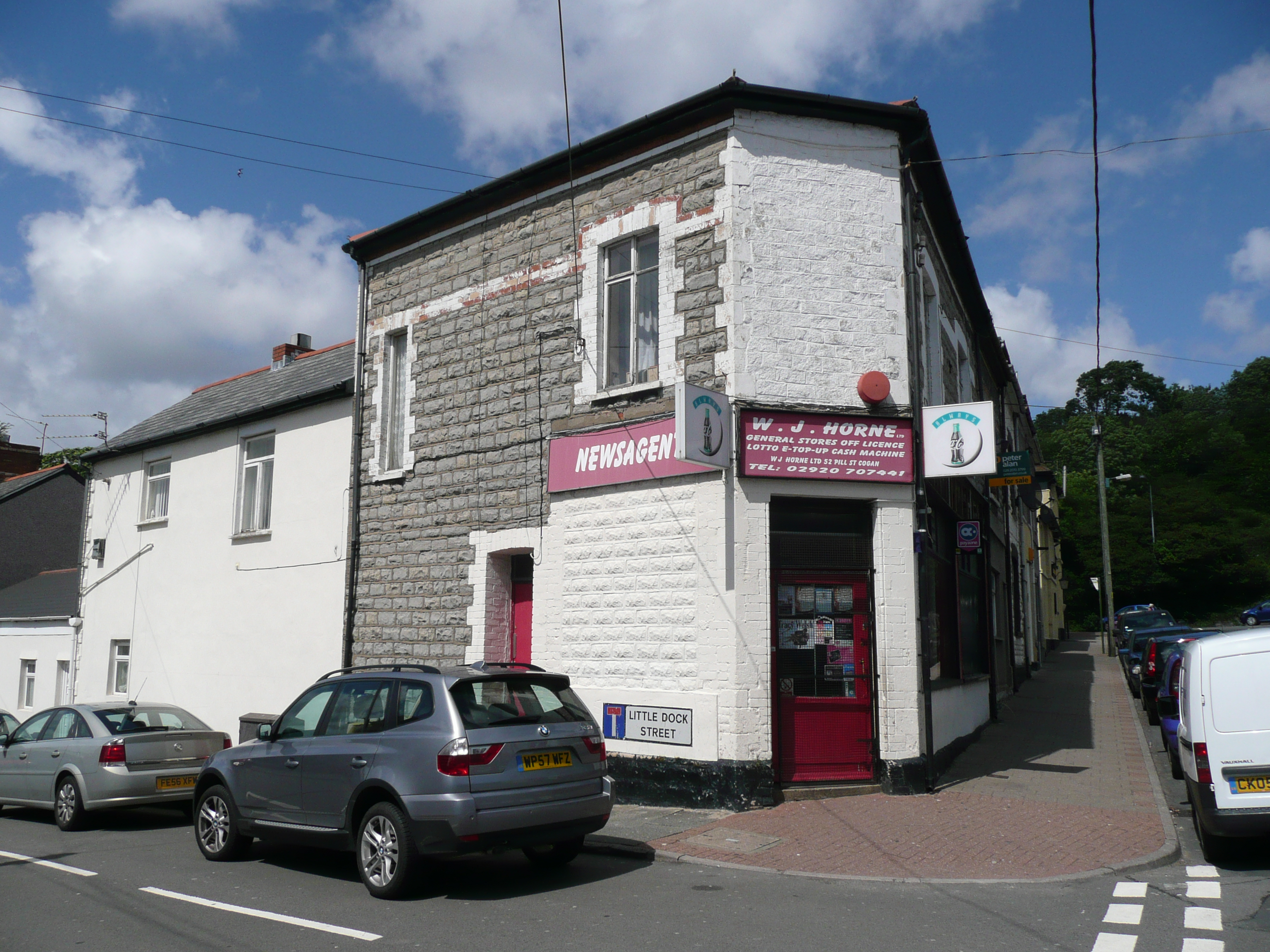
The Cogan general stores, a rare surviving local shop

The building of Penarth Docks in 1865 and the town's rapid growth prompted an explosion of house building in Cogan providing mostly terraced housing, local shops and public houses for dock workers. Most of the building in the village took place over the ten years between 1859 and 1869 and Cogan contained two busy brickworks, making the local marl bricks still seen today all over Cogan and Penarth.

The majority of the many small local Cogan shops, butcher, baker, greengrocer, hardware store, chemist, barbers, newsagents and general grocery shops located on Windsor Road, down Pill Street and on almost all of the street corners in the village had been closed by the early 1950s and converted to residential housing, these former shops being identified by the angled corner facings where the shop entrance doors used to be. Since Cogan's Post Office on Pill Street closed in April 2008, only a taxi control office, a ladies' hairdressers, a Chinese fast food takeaway and a sole surviving general store remain.

Cogan railway station is on the Vale of Glamorgan Line and provides services to Barry, Rhoose, Bridgend and Cardiff. Until 1968, Cogan had two further platforms across the other side of the main Windsor Road, on the Penarth and Sully branch line, from the Cogan Junction points down the coastline to where it rejoined the main line at Cadoxton. The through link was closed under the effects of the Beeching Axe and the rail spur now terminates at Penarth. Dingle Road Halt and Penarth station remain open but the platforms at Cogan were closed when the line was reduced to a single track branchline. Most of the station buildings still stand and have been used by several private businesses including a shooting range, a garden centre, a second-hand car lot and a marine chandlers. The area originally covered by the Cogan and Penarth Dock's railway sidings and engine maintenance sheds now contains a large Tesco supermarket.

Cogan used to be connected to Llandough by Andrew Road which is now closed off to all but public buses. Conversely Pill Street was a dead end until the 1970s when a connection was driven through, up the slope to the newly built Cowslip Estate housing development. Apart from the addition of a street to the garden village in the '90s, no new housing has been built in the village since the early 1970s, when the Cogan Garden Village was completed, on the site of the main Penarth brickmakers, and any further housebuilding is prevented through lack of space to develop; the village is bounded on two sides by the railway tracks, by the Cowslip slope on another, and by the Poets Estate on the fourth side. The only land now not built on is the sports fields attached to the Penarth Leisure Centre, land that originally formed the common land of the village green where small holders grazed their animals in medieval times.

== Education ==
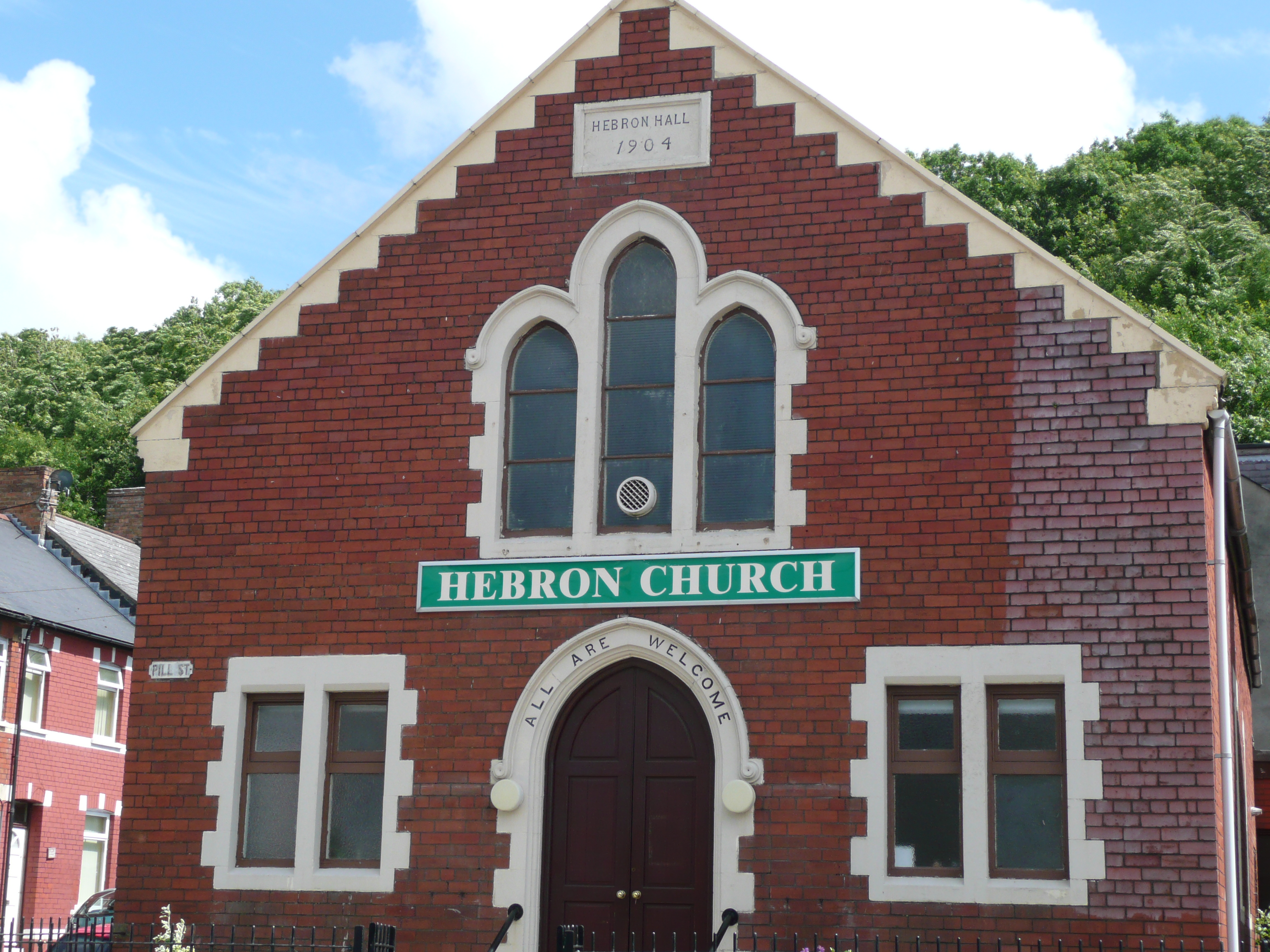
Hebron Church, Pill Street

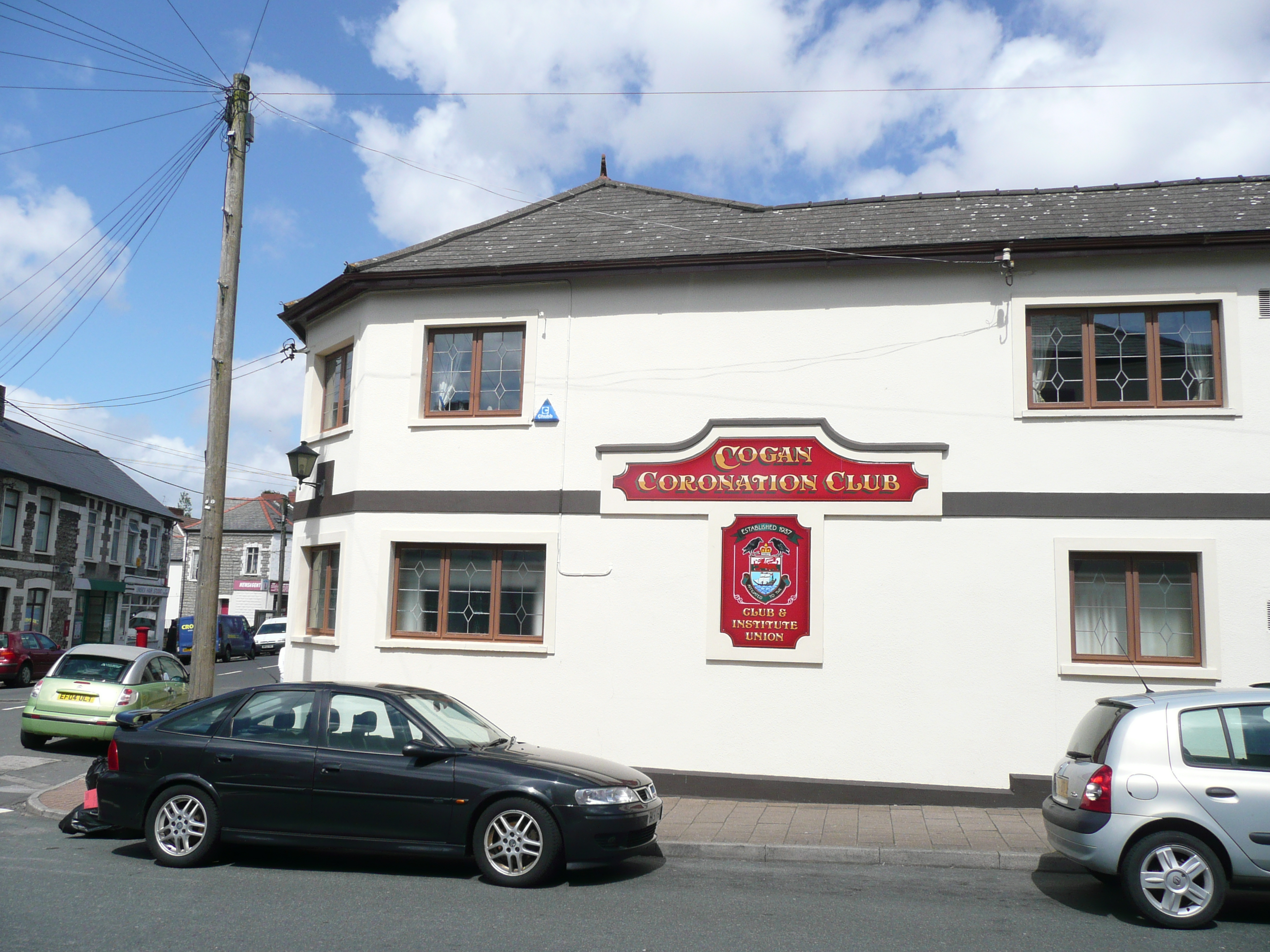
Cogan Coronation Club

The only school in Cogan is Cogan Primary School in Pill Street, administered by the Vale of Glamorgan Local Education Authority. It is a mixed school of non-denominational religion. The school building is a well-maintained Victorian structure.

== Religious sites ==
Hebron Methodist Church, a place of worship since 1904, is on Pill Street.

== Sport ==
Penarth's premier football club is located in Cogan and forms part of Cogan Coronation Sports Club, playing their games at the Leisure Centre's playing fields. Cogan Coronation AFC's first team, known locally as "The Coro", plays in the South Wales F.A. Senior League 1st Division and the club fielded eighteen teams of all ages during the 2007/2008 season.

Cogan Leisure Centre, serving the community of Penarth, is located within the village.
