= Cardiff International Sports Village =

Sporting complex in Cardiff, Wales

Coordinates: 51°27′5″N 3°10′59″W

Official logo

Cardiff International Sports Village (Welsh: Pentref Chwaraeon Rhyngwladol Caerdydd) is located in Cardiff Bay in the city of Cardiff, Wales. It is one of the largest regeneration projects currently in the UK and is a public-private funded project.

The site currently has a 50-metre (164 ft) Olympic standard swimming pool, an ice rink and a white water canoeing and kayaking centre.

Upon completion, an indoor snow centre with real snow for skiing and snowboarding, and a hotel were also planned. Other proposals included a 220-metre (722 ft) observation tower and a super-casino, although both these schemes are unlikely to ever be realised. The sporting facilities were used as a training venue for the London 2012 Olympics along with the Millennium Stadium, which hosted some of the football.

In 2019, Cardiff Council approved a new ten year masterplan for the International Sports Village site with plans for around 1,000 new apartments, bars, restaurants and leisure facilities.

== History of the site ==
Chain Ferry over the River Ely

In the early part of the 19th century Welsh coal was in much demand throughout the world. Cardiff was the centre of this export trade, but it was under the control of the Bute family. In 1859, the Taff Vale Railway Company created a series of wharves in the mouth of the River Ely. In the 1860s a chain ferry (which gave Ferry Road its name) opened, giving dockers a shortcut between the two sides of the mouth of the river. The ferry was replaced in 1900 by the Ely Subway.

The Railway public house, named because of the criss cross of tracks over the site became known as the Red House. This well known inn was used as a beacon to navigate sea going craft until its recent demolition.

When the barrage was completed, the site became prime real estate again with a freshwater lake on the shore. This would eventually become the Cardiff International Sports Village.

== Present developments ==
=== Ice Arena Wales ===
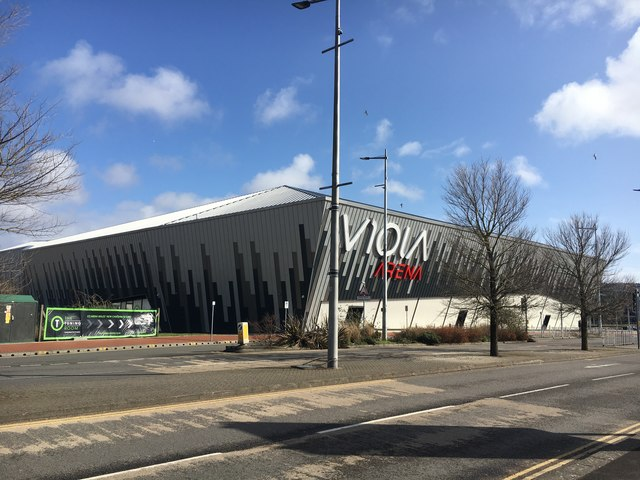
Ice Arena Wales, now known as the Viola Arena

Ice Arena Wales is an ice hockey rink which opened on 12 March 2016. It has two ice rinks and seating for over 3,000 spectators. It is home to the Cardiff Devils, who play in the professional British Elite Ice Hockey League.

=== Cardiff International Pool ===
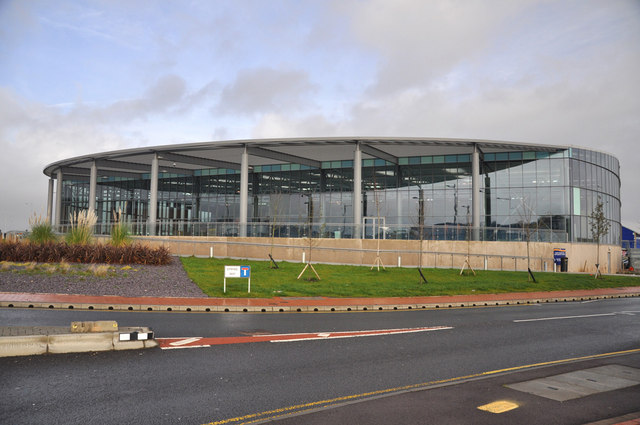
Cardiff International Pool

The Cardiff International Pool opened on 12 January 2008 and is a public-private funded project partnership between Cardiff Council (land owner) and Parkwood Leisure (operator). Orion Land and Leisure and Explore Investments were also partners in developing the pool, however they have now pulled out of their wider agreement with Cardiff Council to develop the sports village site. Construction of the £32 million facility commenced in April 2006 and includes a 50 m (160 ft) 10-lane competition swimming pool with seating for 1,000 spectators, a 25 m (82 ft) 4-lane warm up/leisure pool, plus 4 flume rides, a beach area with water slides and a gym. The building also features a rarely used sun terrace, accessed via the main competition pool area.

=== Cardiff International White Water ===
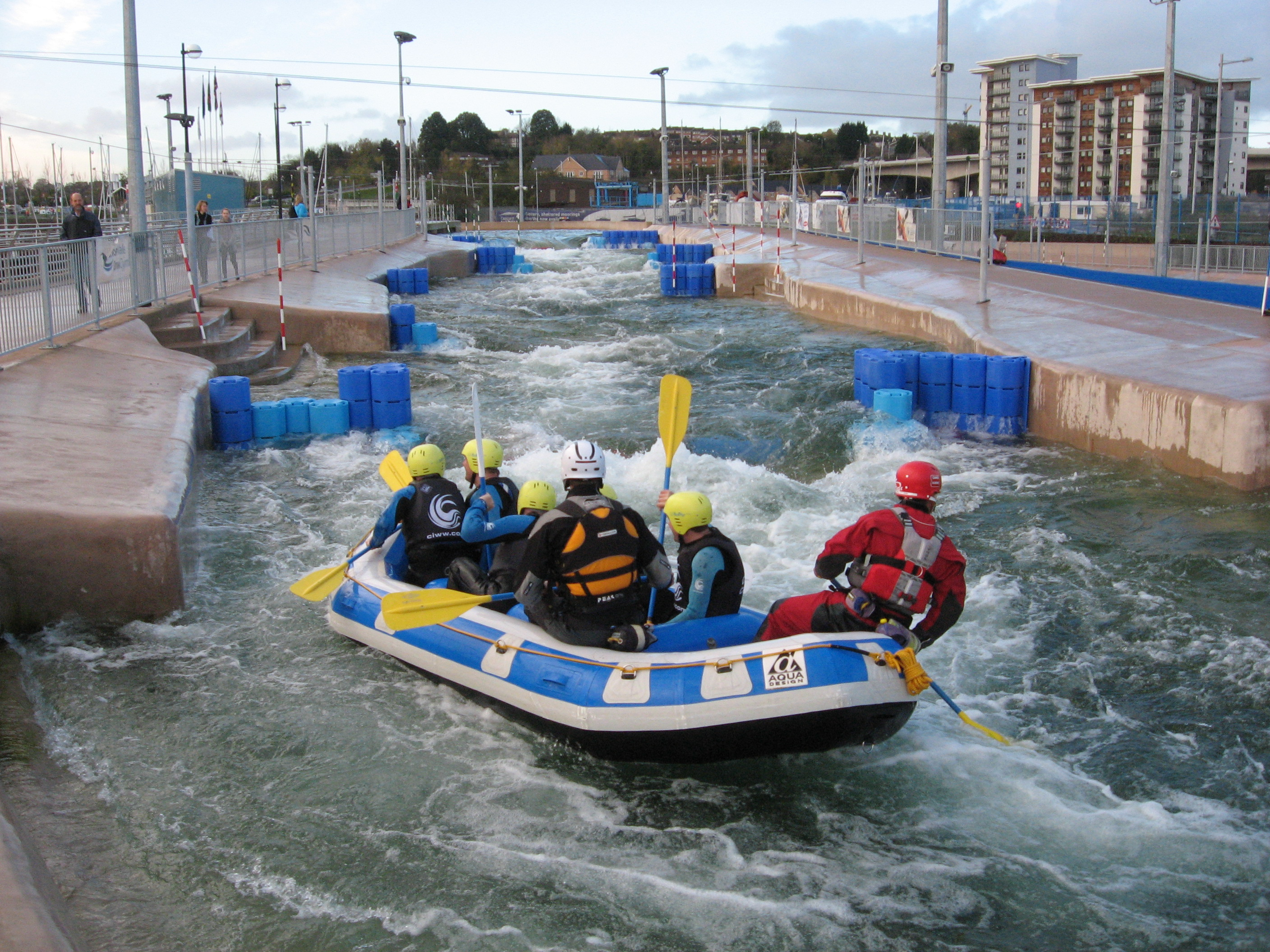
Cardiff International White Water

An Olympic standard white water rafting centre, Cardiff International White Water, opened on 27 March 2010 at the sports village. The 250-metre-long course, which cost £13.3 million, is the UK's first Olympic-standard pumped water canoe slalom course.

=== Pont y Werin ===
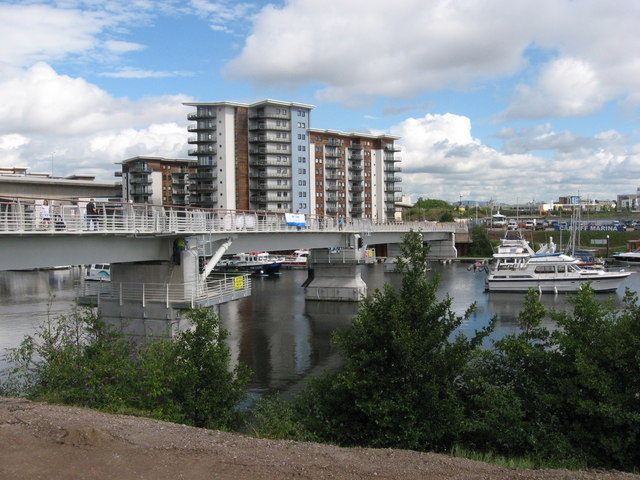
Pont y Werin and Victoria Wharf (residential development) in the background

Costing approximately £5 million, Pont y Werin (English: People's Bridge) is a bridge crossing the River Ely, allowing pedestrians and cyclists to travel between the International Sports Village (ISV) and Penarth. It has significantly enhanced non vehicular access to the site by allowing the public to travel to the ISV via Cogan railway station. It also completes the six and a half mile Bay circular walk. Construction of the 140 m (460 ft) pedestrian and cycle bridge, designed by Faber Maunsell and Holder Mathias architects, commenced in summer 2009 and it opened to the public in July 2010. The four main sections, which weigh between 38 and 46 tonnes, were lowered into place by the 1,200-tonne crane, the largest in the UK, in late March 2010. Funding for the new bridge came from the Welsh Government (£1.645m), Cardiff Council (£1.3m), Sustrans (£1.15m), Cardiff Harbour Authority (£250,000) and £200,000 from the Vale of Glamorgan Council. Sustrans used part of a £50m award it received from the Big Lottery Fund in 2007 after winning a national TV vote.

=== Residential developments ===
Residential developments

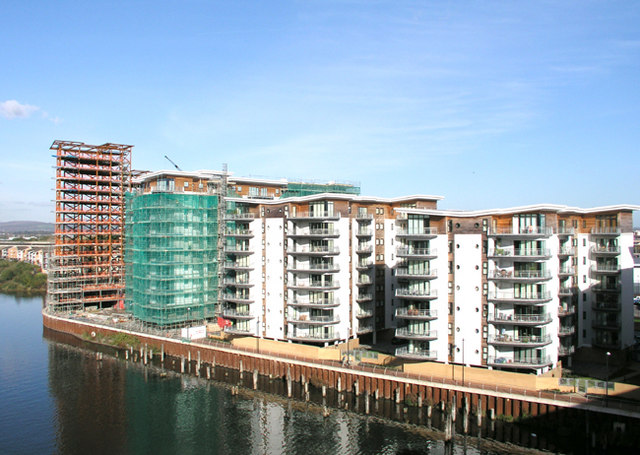
Victoria Wharf

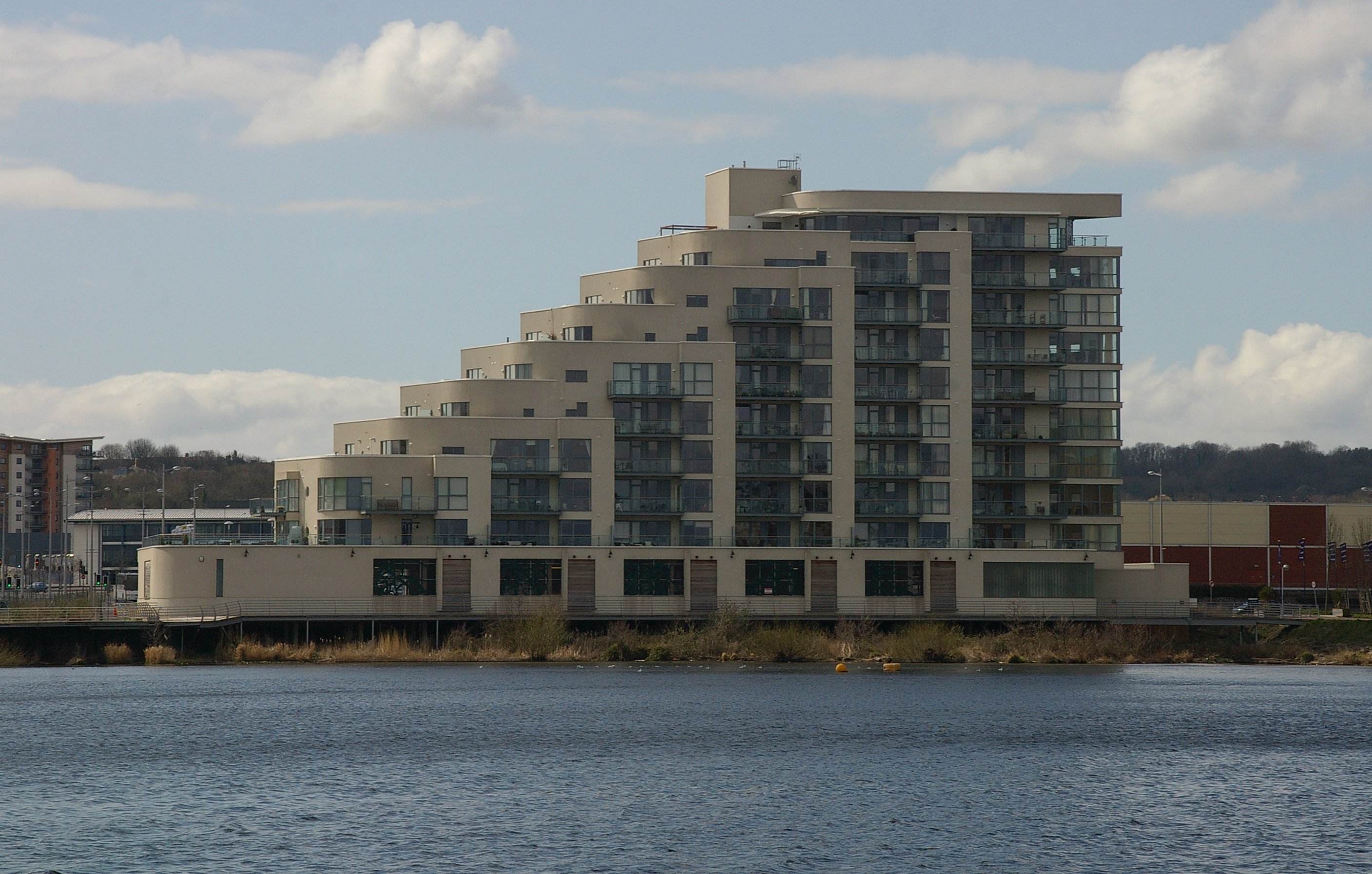
Watermark apartments

Existing residential developments include Victoria Wharf, Prospect Place and Waterside. Proposed residential developments included Bay Pointe, which was due to include Wales' tallest building. In December 2008 the developer announced that the original plans for the scheme were being scrapped due to the economic climate and difficult housing market, and that any future residential development on the site of the proposed towers was likely to be of a much lower density. However a new high rise development, put forward by a different developer, has since been granted planning permission which will include a 139m tall luxury hotel, apartments and ancillary retail/leisure units. The new development is called Bayscape.

=== Retail developments ===
Retail developments

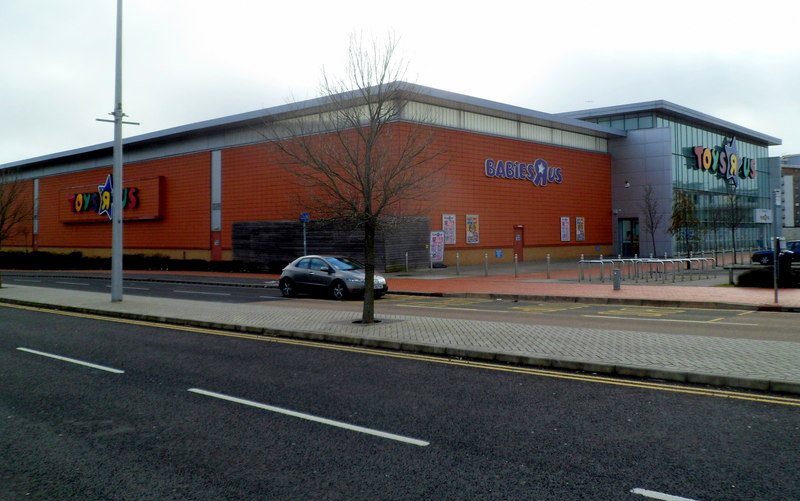
Toys R Us (now closed)

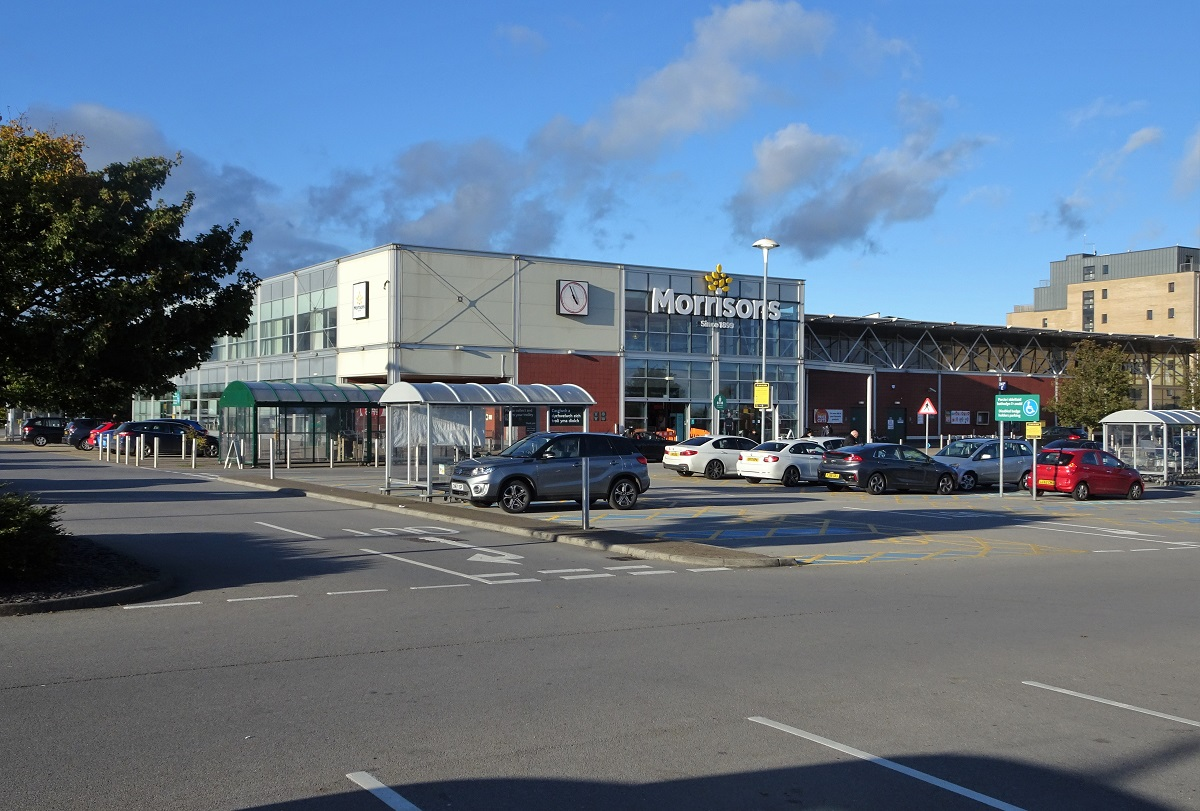
Morrisons

Two superstores with associated surface car parks have been constructed for the supermarket chain Morrisons and the toy retailer Toys R Us. The Morrisons store also includes a petrol station next to the entrance of the car park. One further retail plot will be released in the future and it is likely that any future leisure schemes on site, such as Bayscape, will include at least some small retail units as part of a mixed use development.

The Toys R Us store has since closed down. In 2018, Cardiff Council acquired the superstore for £3.9m to develop a new adventure sports led attraction.

== Previous and aborted developments ==
=== Cardiff Arena ===
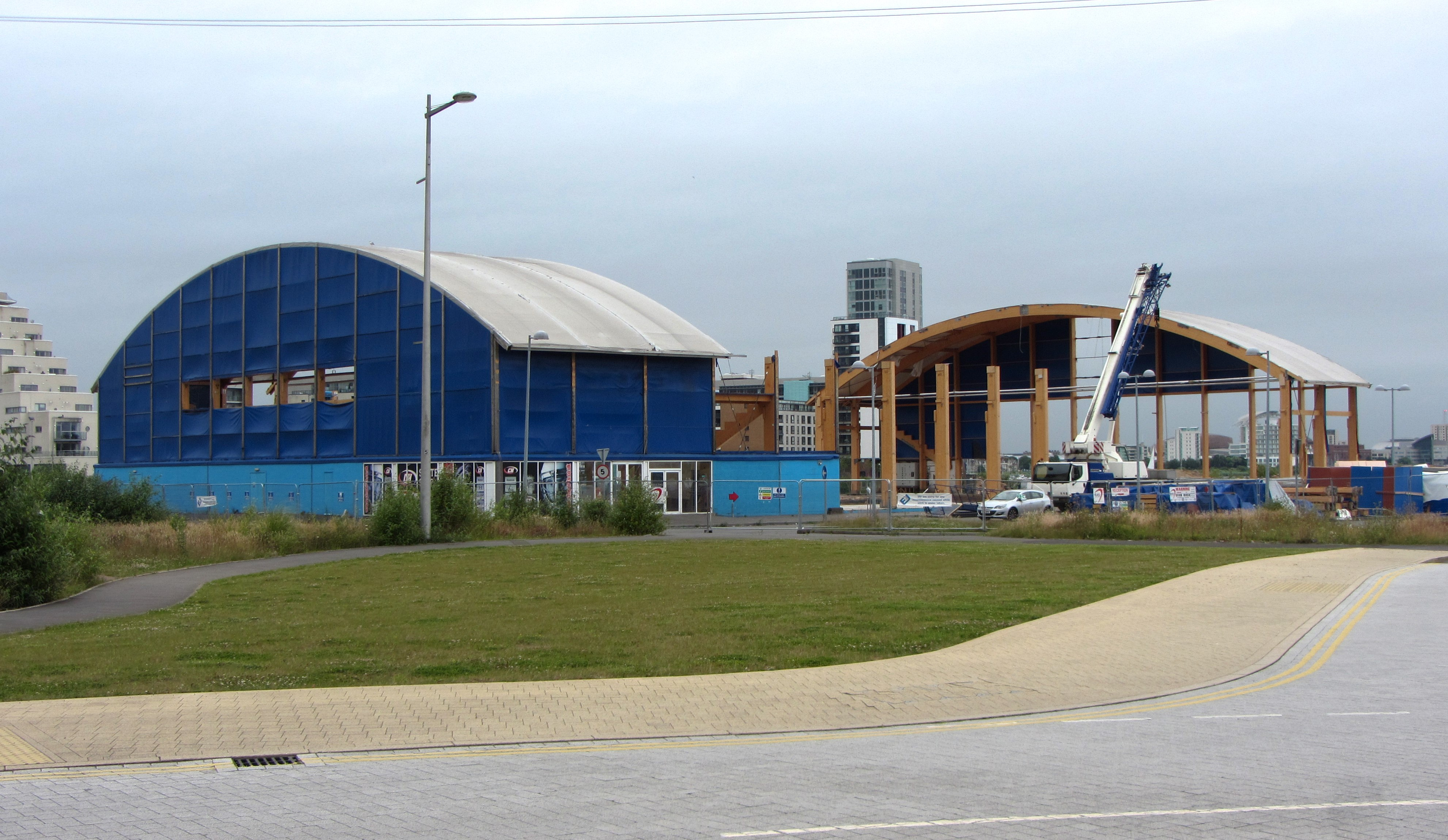
Cardiff Arena being dismantled

This was a temporary ice arena with a capacity of 2,500 spectators for ice hockey and was home to the Cardiff Devils. The prefabricated building was constructed in Finland and was operated by the private sector company Planet Ice. The rink opened on 6 December 2006 following several delays and closed after the Cardiff Devils moved to the Ice Arena Wales on 12 March 2016.

=== Super casino ===
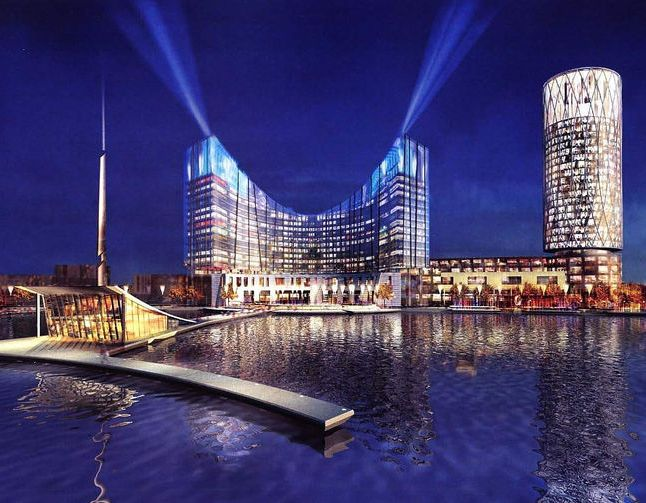
The aborted plans for a super-casino

Cardiff Council had bid for the single super-casino licence or one of 8 large casino licences being issued by the UK government, but was unsuccessful in both bids. Following its rejection the council had intended to continue to press for a licence to be granted, though this became irrelevant after the government eventually scrapped the legislation creating the casinos altogether.

=== Viewing tower ===
A 220-metre viewing tower providing panoramic views over South Wales and the Bristol Channel had originally been proposed for the ISV site. Due to insufficient funding stemming from the failure to win the super casino licence and later the economic downturn, the plans were shelved.

== Transport ==
=== Road ===
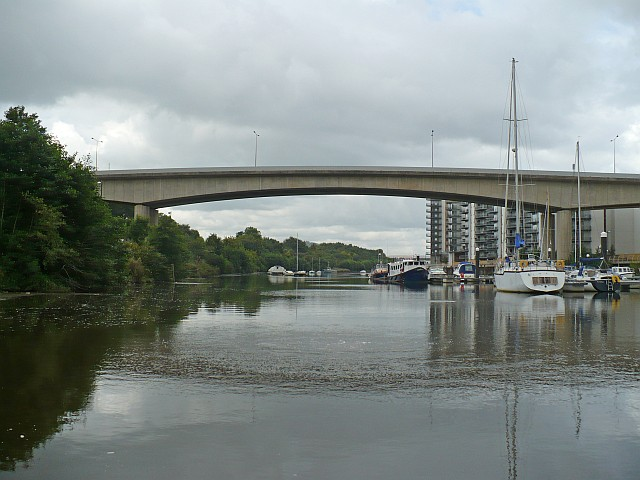
Cogan Viaduct, part of the Cogan Spur

The site is connected to the national road network via the Cogan Spur on the A4055 and the A4232 and then onto the M4 J33.

=== Rail ===
The nearest station is Cogan railway station in Cogan, which is approximately 10 minutes away by foot via Pont y Werin.

=== Bus ===
Cardiff Bus operates the following services to the Bay:

- 5 – City Centre (Cardiff Central Library) via Cardiff Bay
- 9 – City Centre (Cardiff Queen Street railway station and Cardiff Central Library) via Grangetown
- X45 – St.Mellons via Newport Road, City Centre and Grangetown

=== Air ===
The nearest airport is Cardiff Airport, about 30 minutes away by road, or by rail on the Vale of Glamorgan Line from Cogan railway station, which has frequent scheduled and charter flights to the UK, Europe, North America and Africa.

== Government ==
The site is in the Grangetown ward, which is part of Cardiff Council.

== Troubles with the project ==
In 2007 Cardiff failed in its bid to win a super casino licence from the UK government. This was a significant blow to the project as the super casino was intended to be the focal point of the site, acting as a magnet for tourists and providing revenues to fund the village's sporting facilities. The opening of the temporary ice rink for Cardiff Devils was delayed by 2 months, forcing them to play home fixtures in other cities. Furthermore, in July 2008 it was announced by Cardiff Council leader Rodney Berman that there is a £55m funding shortfall for phase 2 of the project, delaying the construction of the new permanent ice arena and "Las Vegas style" water feature.

On 22 January 2009, Rodney Berman made a further announcement, saying all future projects, including the arena, snow box, bars, restaurants and hotel were on hold until the economic situation improved. This came after developers announced in December 2008 they had scrapped the flagship Bay Pointe high rise apartment scheme. These funding shortfalls served to underline the flawed nature of the project, being overly dependent on too few developments which were never certain to go ahead, such as the super casino.

In November 2010 it was revealed that Orion Land and Leisure, the private sector company co-developing the village with Cardiff Council, had pulled out of its agreement to develop the site. The reason for the split was not disclosed by either party. In spite of this setback however the council remained committed to the project; in order to kick start progress they invited private companies to submit their own proposals for individual development plots, so long as these fulfil the broad aims of the council in terms of specific sport and leisure provision. This marks a change of direction from the top down approach that was originally envisaged for the project, in which private companies were brought in to build and operate leisure and sports facilities predetermined by the council.
