= Bay Point =

Bay Point may refer to:

- Bay Point (Antarctica)
- Bay Point, California
- Bay Point (former settlement), California
- Bay Point, Monroe County, Florida
- Bay Point (South Carolina), in Charleston, South Carolina's harbor; see Mitchelville
- Bay Point BART station, California
- Bay Point Schools, a detention site for undocumented immigrants, Miami, Florida

== See also ==
- Bay Pointe, Cardiff Bay, Cardiff, Wales
