= Bayscape =

General information
- Status: Approved
- Type: apartments
- Location: Cardiff Bay, Cardiff, Wales
- Coordinates: 51.4495°N 3.1838°W
- Cost: £60 million

Height
- Roof: 127 metres (417 ft)

Technical details
- Floor count: 32

Design and construction
- Architect(s): Custard Architecture
- Developer: Cardiff Marine Group / Bayscape Ltd

Bayscape is a planned skyscraper development in Cardiff Bay, Wales. Originally planned to be completed in 2013, the development underwent a redesign by Rio Architects that was approved on 13 June 2013.

== Plans ==
Phase I of the development includes 115 apartments in two blocks alongside three commercial units. Phase II of the development was initially planned to comprise 170 apartments in a 28 storey tower, but is undergoing redesign as of early 2019.

The development site is located in the £1 billion regeneration project in Cardiff Bay, the Cardiff International Sports Village. The site of the project is situated along Victoria Wharf next to the River Ely and Cardiff International White Water, linked to the Pont y Werin footbridge and Waterbus stop. Cardiff International Pool is 200 yards away.

== See also ==
- List of tallest buildings in Cardiff
