= Cogan railway station =

Railway station in the Vale of Glamorgan, Wales

Cogan
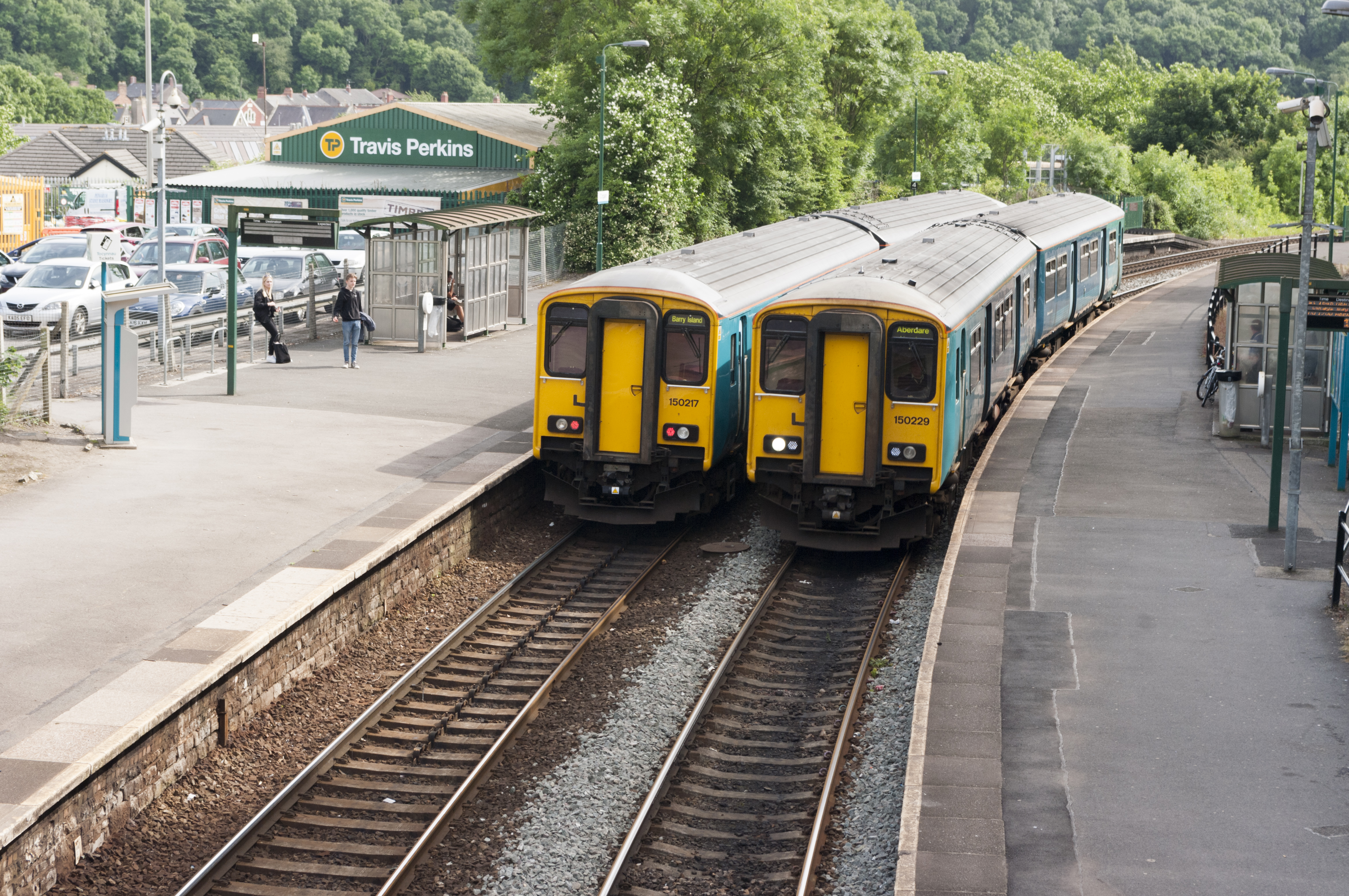
- Two Class 150 DMU trains wait at Cogan station

General information
- Location: Cogan, Vale of Glamorgan; Wales
- Coordinates: 51°26′46″N 3°11′21″W
- Grid reference: ST174725
- Managed by: Transport for Wales
- Platforms: 2

Other information
- Station code: CGN
- Classification: DfT category F2

Key dates
- 20 December 1888: Station opened
- 14 August 1893: Junction made with Taff Vale Railway

Passengers
- 2020/21: ▼50,428
- 2021/22: ▲0.185 million
- 2022/23: ▲0.243 million
- 2023/24: ▲0.284 million
- 2024/25: ▲0.308 million
Location
Notes
- Passenger statistics from the Office of Rail and Road

Cogan railway station is a railway station serving Cogan in the Vale of Glamorgan, Wales. It is on the Vale of Glamorgan Line 2 3/4 miles (4.4 km) south of Cardiff Central on the way to Barry Island and Bridgend.

Passenger services are operated by Transport for Wales as part of the Valley Lines network.

== History ==
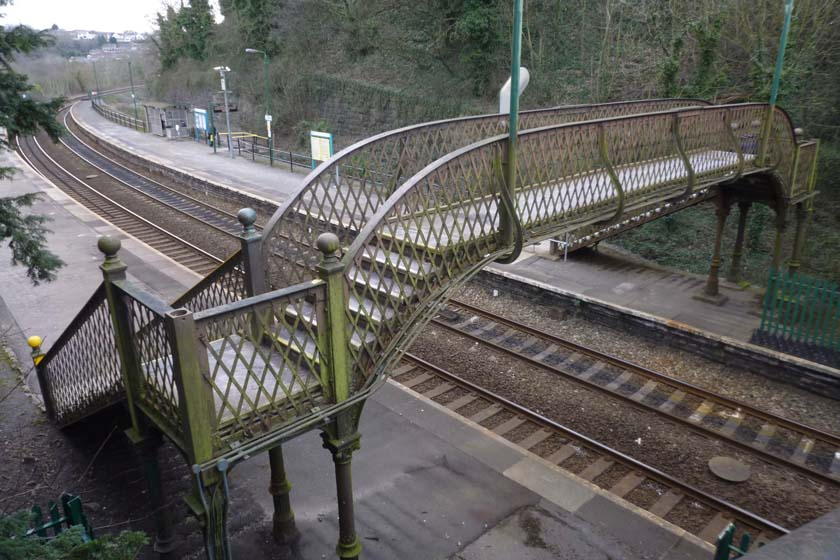
Cast iron footbridge at Cogan station (February 2016)

The current platforms were constructed in 1888, but until 1968 Cogan had two additional and separate platforms on the other side of the main Windsor Road, opened twenty years earlier in 1878 on the Penarth and Sully branch line, which extended from the Cogan Junction points around the coastline through Lavernock and Sully to where it rejoined the main line at Cadoxton. That through link was closed in 1968, and the line now terminates at Penarth.

Dingle Road Halt and Penarth station remain open, but the two platforms at Cogan were closed when the line was reduced to a single-track spur. Most of the station buildings still stand but have been used by several private businesses including a shooting range, a garden centre, a second-hand car lot, and a marine chandlers. The area originally covered by the Cogan and Penarth dock's railway sidings and engine maintenance sheds now contains a large Tesco supermarket.

The cast iron footbridge between the two platforms has a heritage listing of Grade II. It was removed and refurbished in 2019. New lighting and decking was added whilst the bridge was painted in the red and white colour scheme of the original Barry Railway who erected the bridge.

The station is close to Pont y Werin, a pedestrian and cyclist bridge linking Penarth to the Cardiff International Sports Village in Cardiff Bay, which opened in July 2010.

== Service ==
Monday to Saturday daytimes, there is a 15-minute frequency northbound to Cardiff Central and beyond. Southbound, there are three trains per hour to Barry Island and an hourly service to Bridgend via Rhoose.

Evenings and Sundays, there is generally a half-hourly service to Cardiff Central. Evenings, there is an hourly service southbound to Barry Island and Bridgend whilst on Sundays there is a half-hourly service to Barry Island and one to Bridgend every two hours.

Preceding station	National Rail	Following station
Grangetown	Transport for Wales; Vale Line	Eastbrook
