= Ely Subway =

Pedestrian tunnel in South Wales

Coordinates: 51°26′51.4″N 3°10′32.8″W

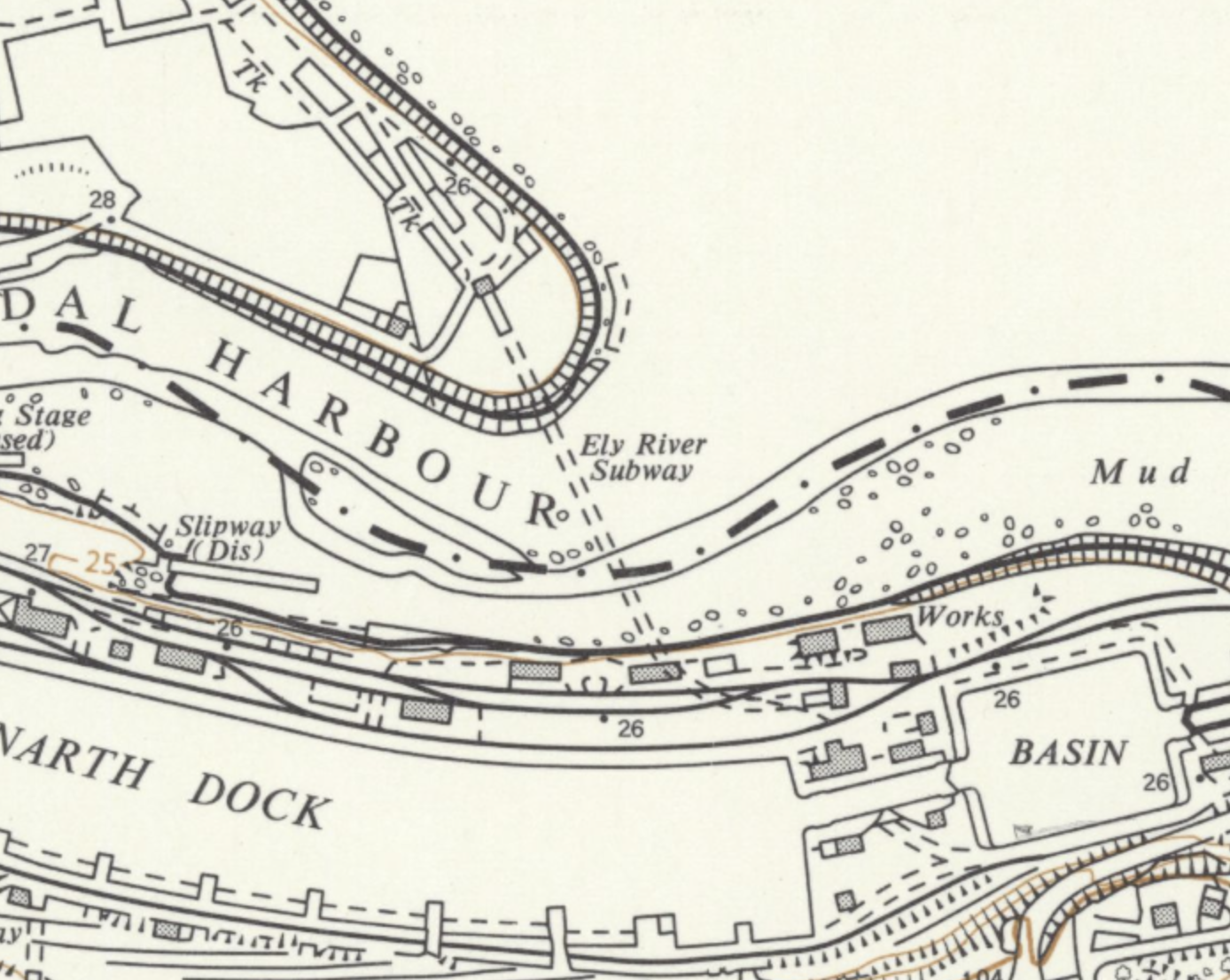
The Ely Subway's route beneath the river, mapped by Ordnance Survey in 1965 (shortly after the tunnel's closure)

The Ely Subway is a disused pedestrian tunnel beneath the mouth of the River Ely in South Wales.

Opened in 1900, it provided a direct connection between Penarth Dock and Grangetown until its closure in 1963.

== History ==
Penarth Dock opened in 1865 on the southern edge of Cardiff Bay, at the mouth of the Ely. However, the nearest crossing over the river was a road bridge nearly a mile upstream at Llandough. The operators of the dock, the Taff Vale Railway Company, introduced a chain ferry across to the northern bank of the Ely as a shortcut for both their workers (many of whom lived in Grangetown) and members of the public. However, the ferry was unable to run in bad weather—even sinking twice during storms—and as the docks continued to develop in importance a permanent crossing was considered necessary.

The company submitted a bill to Parliament in 1896 seeking permission for a number of new works, one of which was a tunnel beneath the river to replace the ferry. Construction began in July 1897 on a subway designed by George Sibbering, the company's chief engineer, with works overseen by Thomas Taylor, a contractor from Pontypridd. The ramped entrances at either end were dug by hand but the majority of the route—297 metres (325 yd) of the subway's total length of 370 metres (400 yd)—was tunneled with a Greathead shield, of the same design used for the Central London Railway. The northern entrance was located at the southern end of Ferry Road in Grangetown (next to some large petroleum storage tanks owned by the Bear Creek Oil Company), while the southern entrance was next to the dockside Mission Church.

The tunneling process was slow and difficult. The ground was largely a loose mixture of mud, gravel, and clay, and the cast-iron tunnel—only 3.4 metres (11 ft) below the river bed at its deepest point—was subjected to intense differentials in pressure between high and low tides in the bay above. The tunnel flooded twice during construction, in November 1897 and December 1898, although workers were able to evacuate both times without any loss of life. Tunneling finished on 25 September 1899, and a ceremony was held to mark the subway's official opening on 14 May 1900. The total cost of construction was between £25,000 and £26,000.

The subway had a diameter of 3.20 metres (10 ft 6 in), with a usable footpath 1.8 metres (6 ft) wide, and 2.29 metres (7 ft 6 in) of headroom. The tunnel ramped downwards relatively steeply from both entrances to its halfway point, with a gradient of 1 in 7. The interior was painted with a mixture of white enamel and granulated cork to prevent condensation, and lit with electric bulbs. Toll keepers oversaw turnstiles at either entrance, charging pedestrians a penny for entry, cyclists two pence, and prams four pence; horses also reportedly used the subway. It also carried gas and water pipes, and hydraulic lines for coal-loading machinery in the docks, while water leaking in from outside the tunnel was pumped away through drains in the floor. A burst pipe on 4 August 1902 caused a flood and led to the subway's temporary closure.

The subway was officially decommissioned in 1936 as part of the wider closure of Penarth Dock, and the toll keepers were removed, but it nevertheless remained open to pedestrians. It was repurposed as an air raid shelter during the Second World War when the docks were requisitioned for the U.S. Navy.

After the war the subway remained accessible to the public but increasingly fell into disrepair, and it gained a reputation for vandalism and petty crime. It was eventually closed and boarded up in 1963 as part of the wider decommissioning of Penarth Dock; the entrances were then bricked up in 1965. It continued to be used as a conduit for power cables by the South Wales Electricity Board until 1976, when part of the Penarth entrance was demolished and some of the cast iron tunnel sections were removed.

== Present day ==
The demolished southern entrance was sealed over in the 1980s as part of the redevelopment of Penarth Dock into Penarth Marina—the site is now Plas Pamir, a residential road. The bricked-up northern entrance is located within the grounds of Cardiff Bay Yacht Club (no public access).

The tunnel is not actively maintained, but (other than the damage to the southern entrance) remains intact. It was inspected in 1991 during the construction of the Cardiff Bay Barrage and found to be in good condition. However, renovating and reopening it was ultimately not pursued in favour of building Pont Y Werin—a brand new footbridge around half a kilometre upstream—instead.

A commemorative mural of the subway, painted by local artists Peaceful Progress, can be found at the southern end of Pont Y Werin.
