= Bay Pointe =

General information
- Status: Planning Permission Granted
- Type: Penthouse style apartments
- Location: Cardiff Bay, Cardiff, Wales
- Completed: No

Design and construction
- Architect: Atkins
- Developer: Allied Developments (Europe) and City Lofts Group

Bay Pointe was a planned housing development site located in the western area of Cardiff Bay, Cardiff, Wales. The development was to be situated on the peninsula of Cardiff International Sports Village.

== Original proposal ==
One of the early proposals for Bay Pointe, Cardiff

Originally based on an apartment scheme, it would have been one of a number of high-rise developments in Cardiff, which include the Glass Needle and Meridian Gate in Cardiff city centre. The original proposal included 1,800 apartments including a 33-storey tower that would have been the tallest in Cardiff and Wales at 403 ft (122.8m); it was estimated that some apartments could have had a price of £1,000,000.

As part of the Cardiff International Sports Village, it was hoped the project could be completed in time for Cardiff's role in hosting event of the London 2012 Olympics.

== New plans ==
In December 2008, the Western Mail reported that the 33-storey tower was unlikely to ever be built, and the scheme will be replaced by one consisting of townhouses and larger apartment blocks. In August 2009, Chris Hamilton, managing director of developer Bay Pointe Ltd, said the market from customers and in terms of funding had disappeared for big developments made up of apartments. A planning proposal was to be resubmitted based on townhouses.
