= Penarth Dock =

Port and harbour in Wales 1865–1963

Coordinates: 51.445°N 3.178°W

- Location within Wales
- Operated: 1865–1963
- OS grid reference: ST1814272491
- Country: Wales
- Sovereign state: United Kingdom

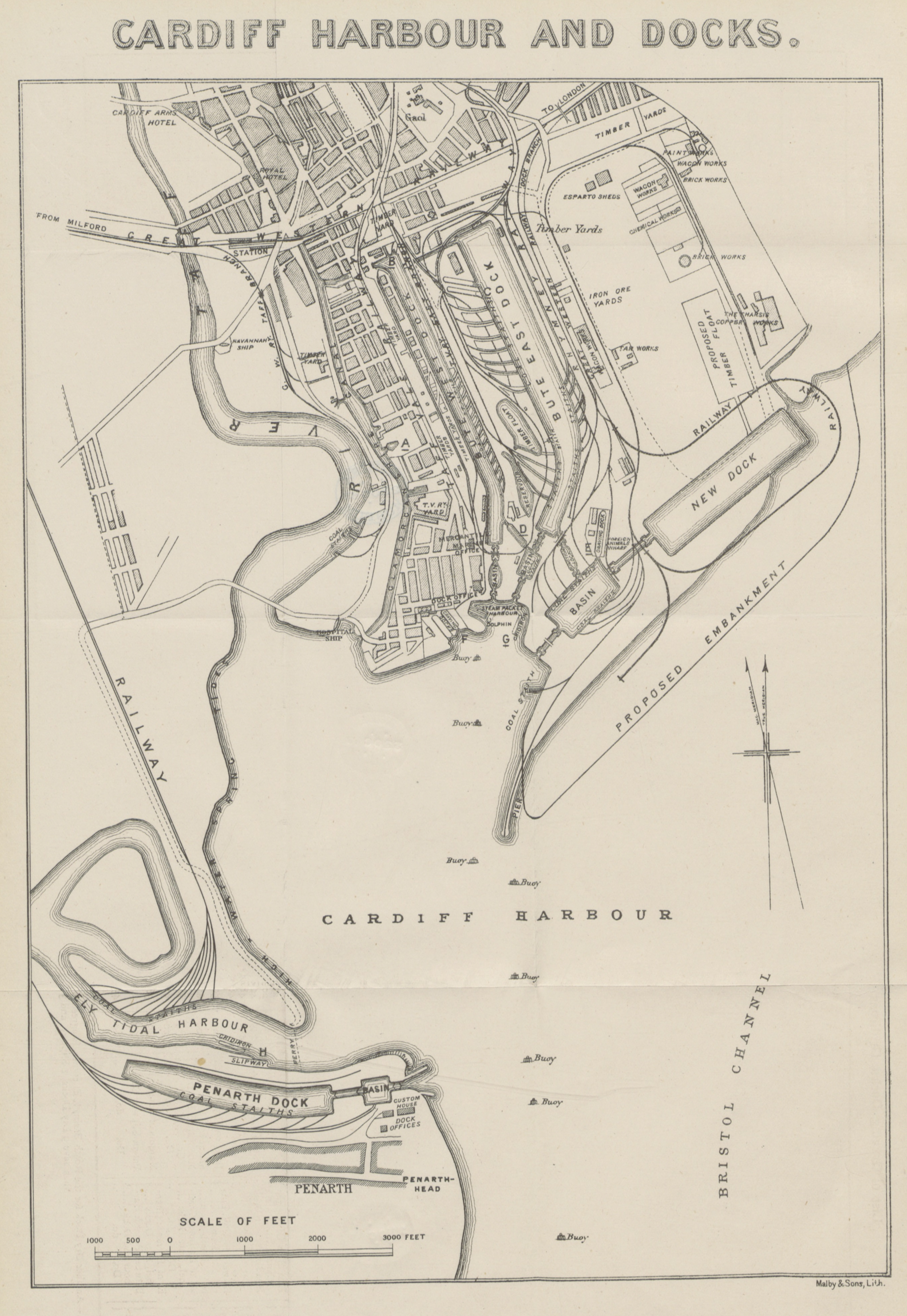
1882 map with Penarth Dock to the south facing Cardiff Docks across Cardiff Harbour

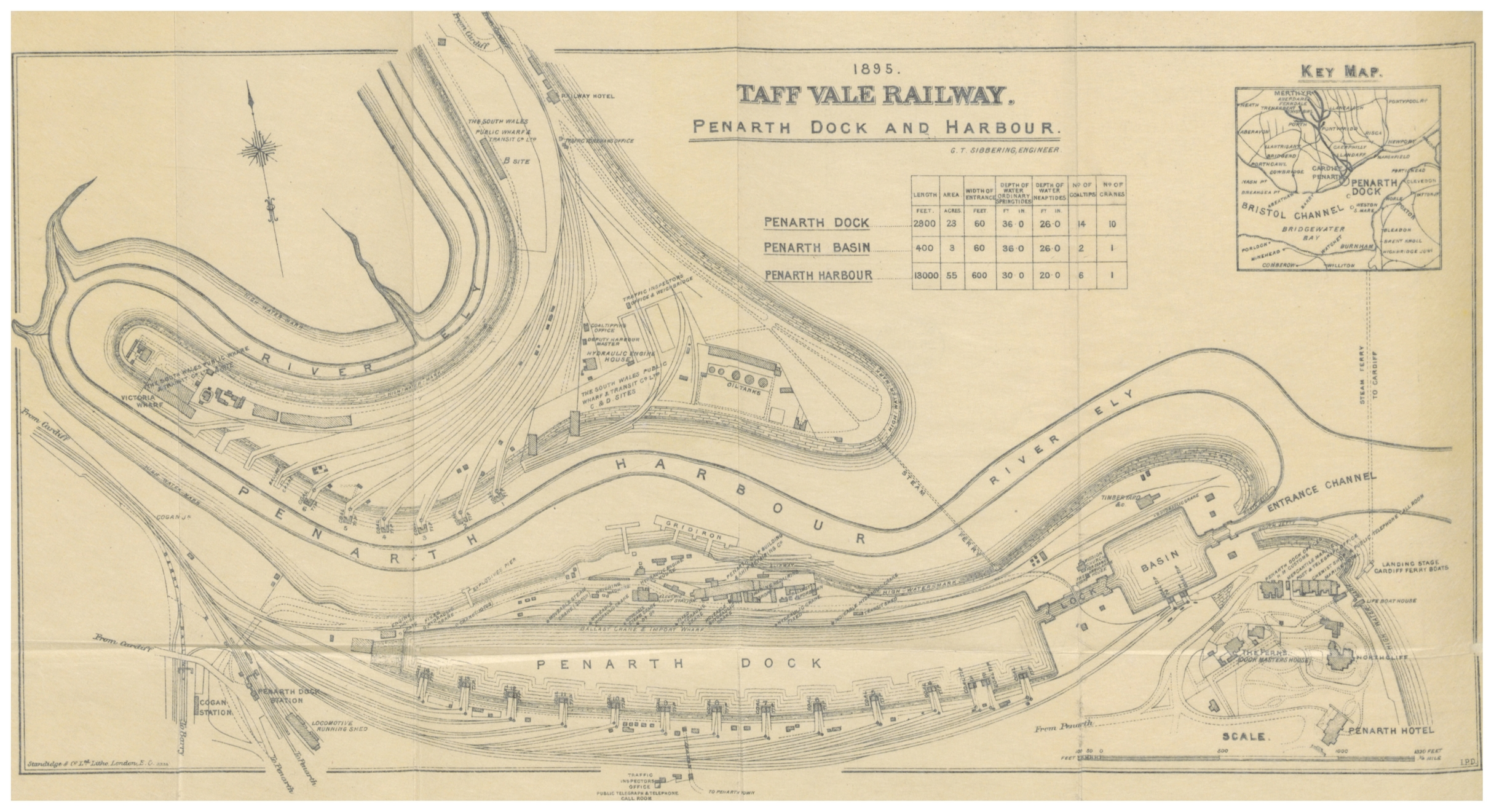
Penarth Dock and the River Ely, 1896

Penarth Dock was a port and harbour which was located on the south bank of the mouth of the River Ely, at Penarth, Glamorgan, Wales. It opened in 1865 and reached its heyday before World War I, after which followed a slow decline until closed in 1963. The site has since been redeveloped to become Penarth Marina, which now opens into Cardiff Bay.

== Early development ==
Harriet Windsor-Clive, Baroness Windsor, whose Plymouth Estate owned vast areas of Glamorgan, formed the Penarth Harbour Company in 1855 with a view to develop a dock for Penarth. She wanted a facility which could rival the new Cardiff Docks which were being constructed a few miles to the north. She was joined in the venture by several prominent politicians and businessmen and, in 1858, engineer John Hawkshaw designed the dock, curving along the south bank of the River Ely. Work on Penarth Dock began in 1859.

The dock was officially opened on Saturday, 10 June 1865. Though Baroness Windsor and her grandson Robert were intended to perform the ceremony, they failed to arrive in time for the high tide. The event was carried out by James Poole, the chairman of the Taff Vale Railway, who were the lessees of the new dock. Penarth Dock covered 26 acres and had a 270 feet long entrance lock.

The Taff Vale Railway took a 999-year lease on Penarth Dock, despite having to fight a legal action against Cardiff's Marquess of Bute as far as the House of Lords to enable them to do so freely. They had initially been given incentives to build their railway to Cardiff Docks rather than Penarth. When they went ahead in 1865 and took a lease on Penarth Dock, the Marquess unsuccessfully tried to levy them on their trade from Penarth.

== In operation ==
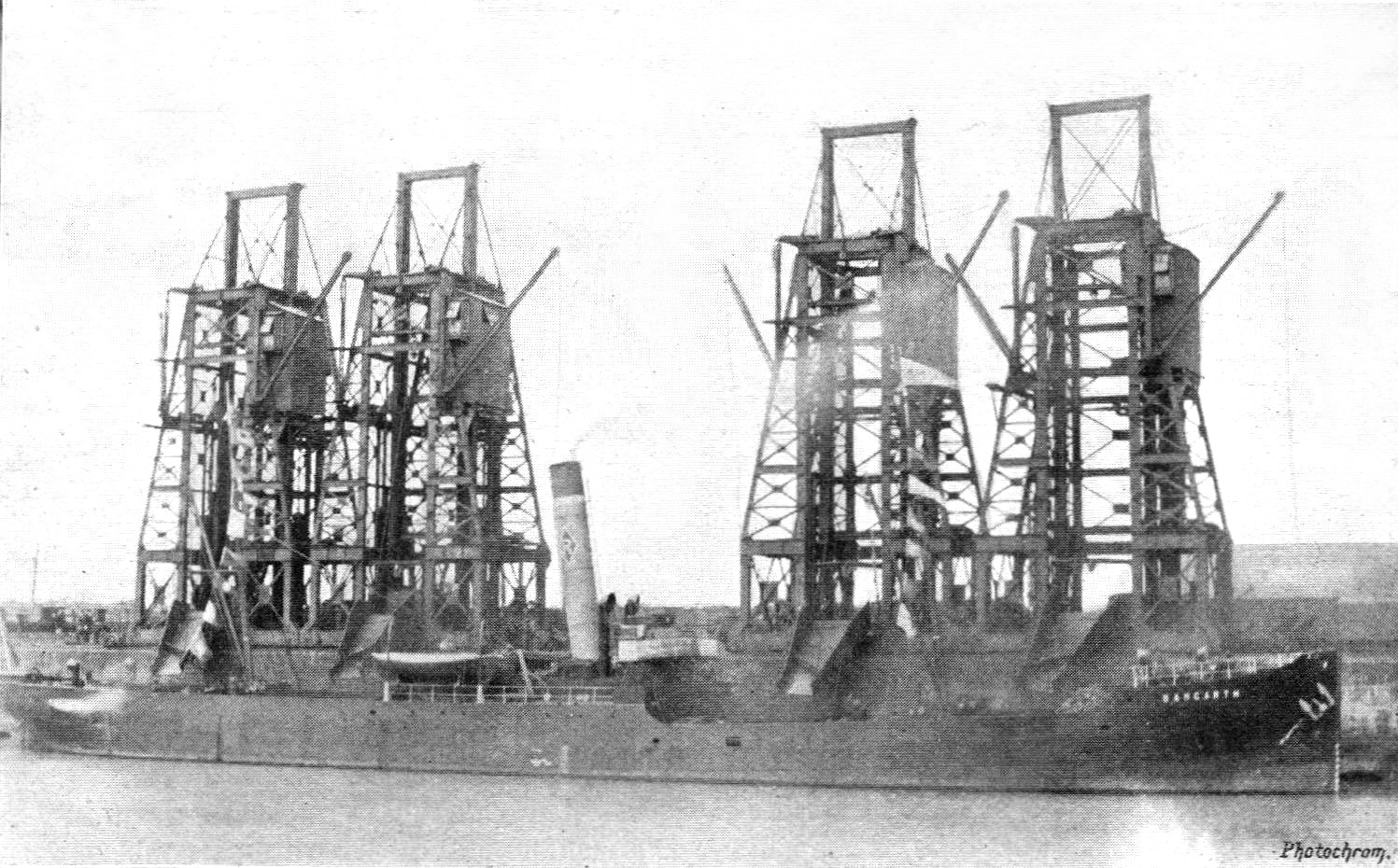
Loading a coal ship at Penarth in 1905

Penarth Dock exported 900,000 tons of coal in 1870 and by 1882 was exporting 2 million tons per year. The dock was enlarged in 1884.

In February 1886 Isambard Kingdom Brunel's famous ship, SS Great Britain, in her new role as a coal ship departed from Penarth Docks bound for Panama. It was, however, to be her final voyage when, after a fire on board, she was diverted to the Falkland Islands and remained there until 1937 as a storage vessel.

The Ely Subway, a pedestrian tunnel beneath the river, was opened in 1900 to provide a shortcut for workers walking between the dock and Grangetown, and was in operation until 1963.

Coal exports from Penarth peaked in 1913, with 4,660,648 tons exported in that year. Trade declined after the Great War, despite all the coal production of the western South Wales Valleys being sent via Penarth. In 1932 the Earl of Plymouth had to forego his royalty payments to help keep the dock in business, but Penarth Dock finally closed in 1936 after annual exports had dropped to 685,000 tons.

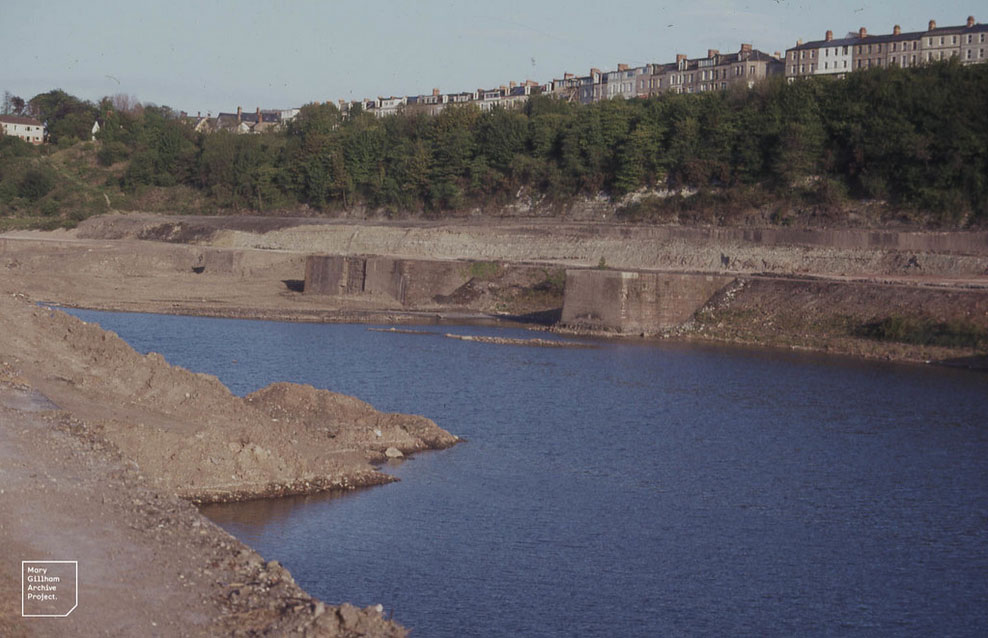
Penarth Docks being cleared (1984)

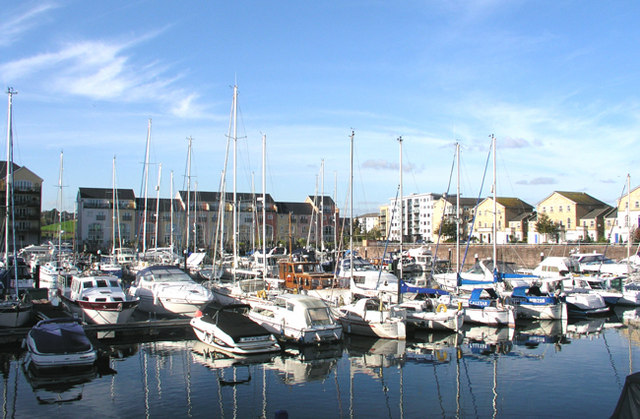
Penarth Marina (2008)

During the Second World War the dock was revived as a training facility for stevedores and, in 1943, became a base for the United States Navy.

== Closure and later use ==
Penarth Dock was closed in 1963. In the 1980s part of the site was earmarked for a later marina and the rest was drained and used as a refuse land-fill site intended for later redevelopment. The new Penarth Marina opened in 1987.
