= Penarth Marina =

Coordinates: 51.445°N 3.175°W

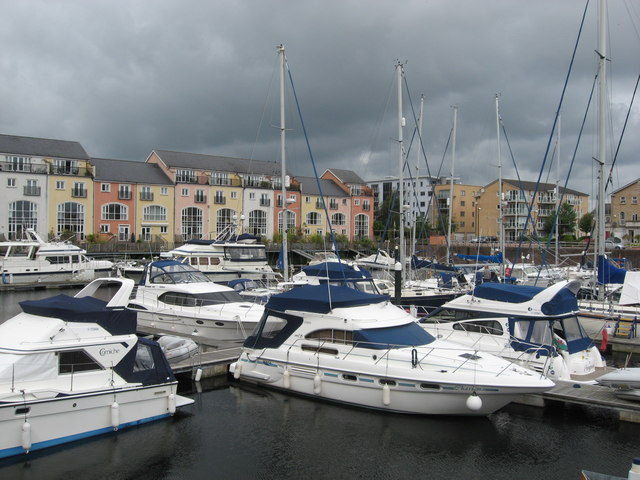
Penarth Marina

Penarth Marina is both a marina for boats, located in the old Penarth Docks, Wales and also the name generally used to describe the surrounding area of modern housing. The marina is adjacent to the waters of the River Ely and Cardiff Bay, close to the Cardiff Bay Barrage.

== Background ==
The old Penarth Dock closed in 1963. Some of its basins were earmarked to be filled with household refuse, while others were to be redeveloped for housing and a marina for leisure boats.

A new yacht lock was built at the entrance in 1986 and the new marina was opened in 1987. It has a boatyard and over 300 berths for yachts and small boats.

In 1999 the construction of the Cardiff Bay Barrage was completed, which meant Penarth Marina improving the safety of the marina environment facing Cardiff Bay.

Old Victorian dock buildings, located between the marina and Cardiff Bay Barrage are being converted for leisure use. The Old Custom House on Dock Road has been converted into restaurants, El Puerto and La Marina. The adjacent Grade II-listed Marine Buildings, built in 1865, were expected to be converted into a hotel but as of 2018 are still derelict and on sale for an estimated £2.25 million.
