= Pont y Werin =

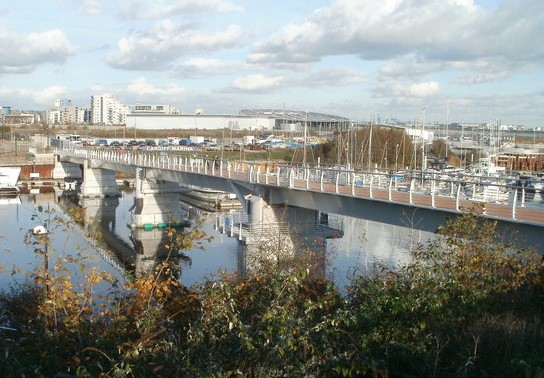
- Pont y Werin, looking towards Cardiff Bay
- Coordinates: 51.4477°N 3.1864°W
- Carries: Cyclists; Pedestrians
- Crosses: River Ely
- Locale: Cardiff Bay, Cardiff, Wales

Characteristics
- Design: Bascule bridge
- Total length: 140 m (460 ft)

History
- Opened: 14 July 2010

Location
- Interactive map of Pont y Werin

Pont y Werin (Welsh for The People's Bridge) is a pedestrian and cyclist bridge spanning the River Ely between Cardiff Bay and Penarth, Wales.

Costing approximately £4.5 million, Pont y Werin crosses between the Cardiff International Sports Village and Penarth, allowing the public to travel to the Sports Village via Cogan railway station.

Opened on 14 July 2010, the bascule bridge completes the 6.5 mile (10.5 km) Cardiff Bay circular walk and cycle route, and incorporates a 20-metre opening section to allow river traffic to pass.

== Funding ==
The project to build Pont y Werin ("the People's Bridge") received a pledge of funding from the Big Lottery Fund, and Sustrans, intending to complete the bridge by summer 2010. Funding for the new bridge came from the Welsh Assembly Government (£1.645m), Cardiff Council(£1.3m), Sustrans (£1.15m), Cardiff Harbour Authority (£250,000) and from the Vale of Glamorgan Council (£200,000). Sustrans used part of a £50m award it received from the Big Lottery Fund in 2007 after winning a national TV vote.

== Construction ==
Pont y Werin under construction
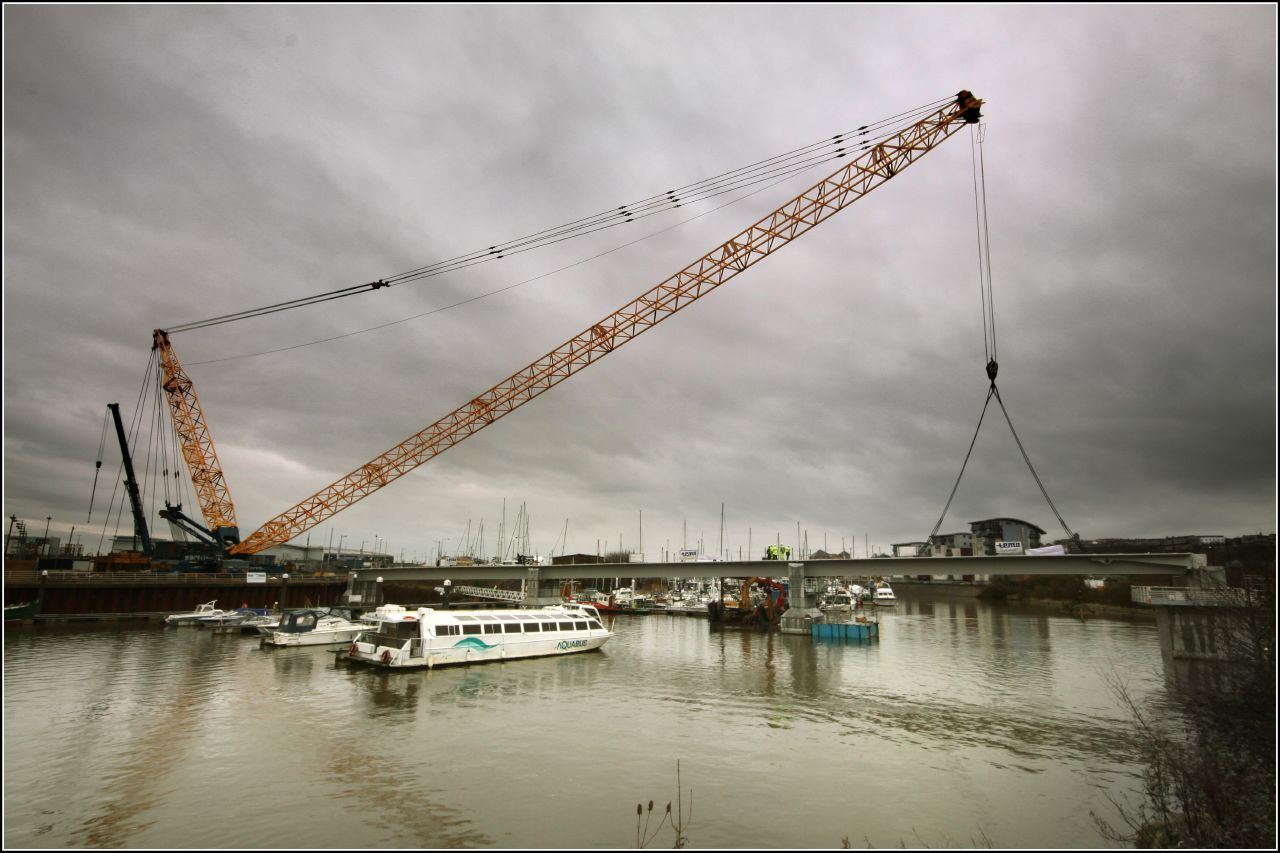
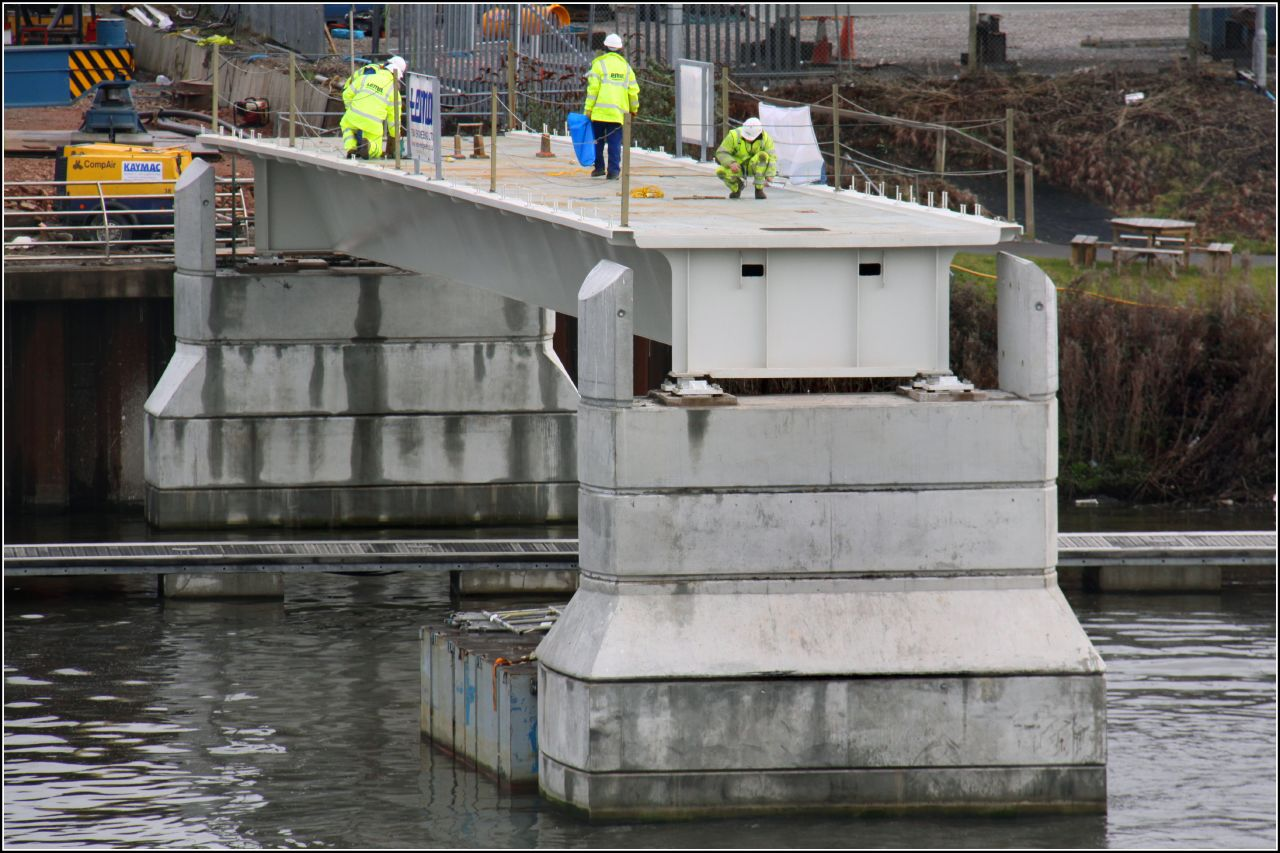
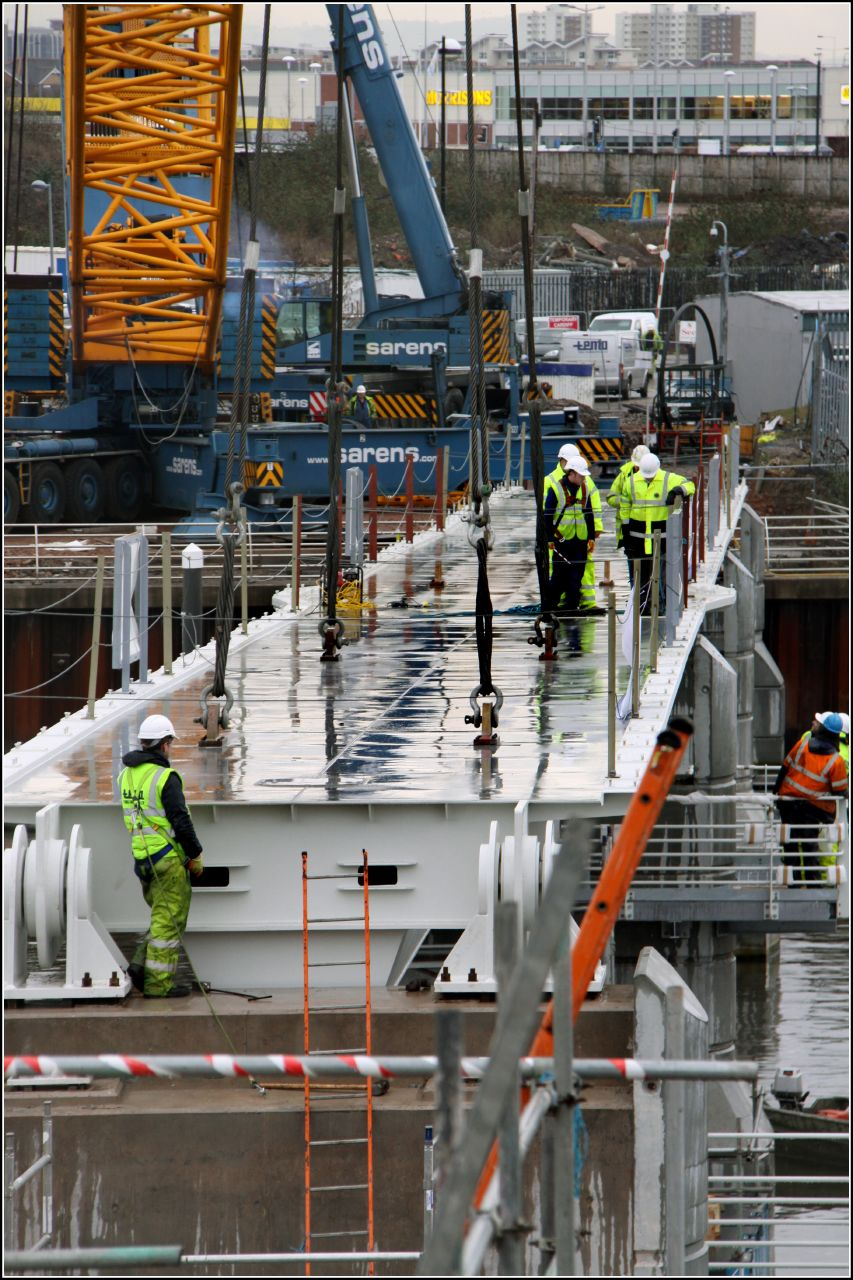

The Pont y Werin was designed by Cass Hayward LLP. Building work to create a new 140 m (460 ft) bridge over the Ely River commenced in summer 2009. The four main sections, which weigh between 38 and 46 tonnes, were lowered into place by the 1,200-tonne crane, the largest in the UK, over a seven-day period in late March 2010 in the presence of Lee Waters, Director of Sustrans Cymru and Jane Davidson AM, Minister for Environment, Sustainability and Housing.

== Opening ==
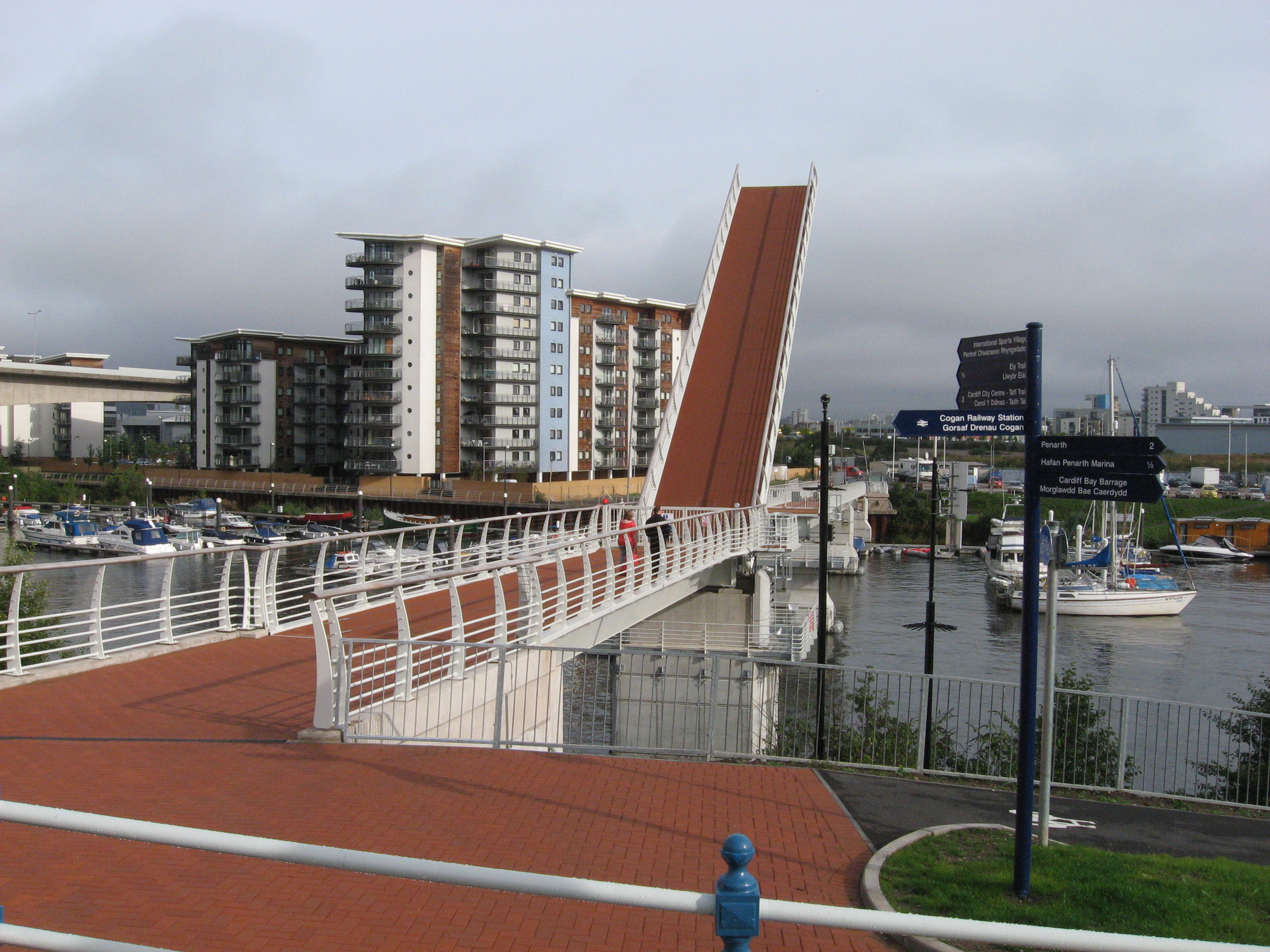
Pont y Werin in the "open" position

Pont y Werin was originally set to open on 8 June 2010 but the date was pushed back six weeks until 14 July due to a delay in receiving supplies from Germany, but was accessible for vessels to pass beneath the bridge before this date. However, none of the cycleway links to the bridge on the Vale of Glamorgan side, costing £300,000, were ready by 14 July.

The bridge was opened by the Deputy First Minister of Wales, Ieuan Wyn Jones who was the then Welsh Minister for Transport. Among those in attendance were Jason Stone, Sybil Williams, Lydia Harris and Tim Burns who were nominated by the public to appear on the bridge's portrait benches.

== Features ==
=== Portraits ===
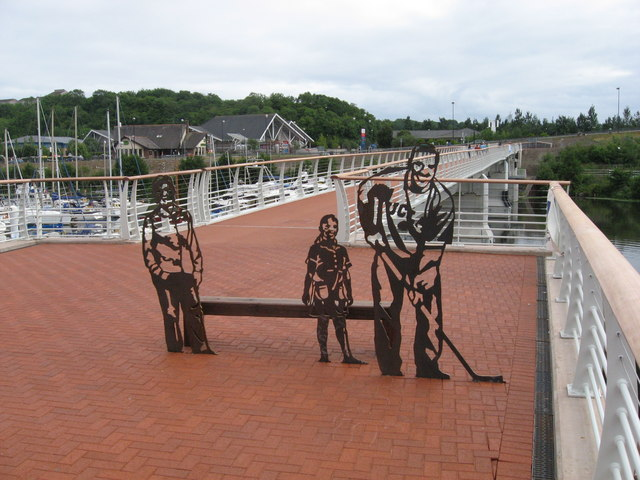
Jason Stone (right)

Portraits on the bridge feature a laser cut outline of local heroes, celebrities or historic figures, with a bench placed on either side of the river each featuring 3 such personalities chosen by Cardiff and Vale of Glamorgan residents. The Portrait Bench is a UK wide art project from sustainable transport charity Sustrans with each bench featuring three life-size sculptures which are laser-cut by Laser Process Ltd from weathering Corten steel. There are nearly 80 installed across the country with Pont y Werin having two benches placed on it – one representing Cardiff and one for Penarth.

For the Vale of Glamorgan's bench, the Vale-born Olympic gold medallist Nicole Cooke was chosen who has been a keen supporter of the bridge, urging people to get behind and vote for the project back in 2007. Paralympic gold medallist, Dame Tanni Grey Thompson, has also been a keen supporter of the bridge, speaking publicly about the benefits it will bring to pedestrians, cyclists and disabled people. She also features as a portrait on the bridge. For the Cardiff bench, Sybil Williams, the founder member of Pedal Power, was chosen along with Cardiff Devils player, Jason Stone. The remaining personality for each bench was chosen by a drawing by local primary school pupils.

The Cardiff Bay side of the bridge will temporarily be diverted through Victoria Wharf whilst a nearby building project is completed.

=== Mural ===
The bridge is only a short distance upstream from the disused Ely Subway, a pedestrian tunnel which provided a direct connection between Penarth Dock and Grangetown for workers and sailors between 1900 and 1963. A mural commemorating the subway by local artists Peaceful Progress is located beneath the southern end of the bridge.

== See also ==
- Cycling in Cardiff
- List of bridges in Wales
