= River Ely =

River in South Wales flowing from Tonyrefail to Cardiff

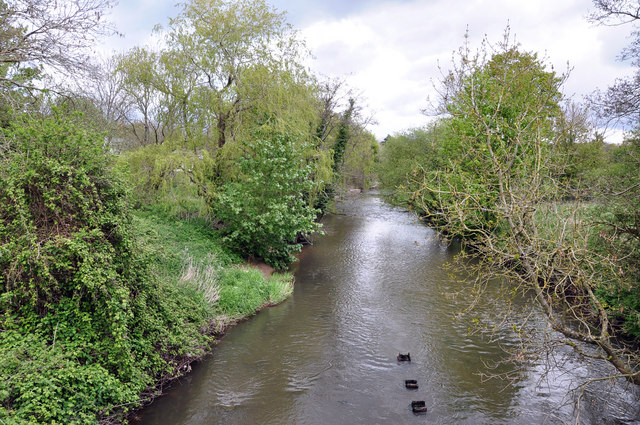
- The river flowing through Peterston-super-Ely
- Native name: Afon Elái (Welsh)

Location
- Country: United Kingdom, Wales
- Region: South Wales
- County: Vale of Glamorgan, Cardiff, Rhondda Cynon Taf
- Cities: Tonyrefail, Llantrisant, Pontyclun, Peterston-super-Ely, Ely, Cardiff, Penarth

Physical characteristics
- Source
  - location: Northwest of Tonyrefail, Rhondda Cynon Taf, Wales
  - coordinates: 51.6034°N 3.460°W
  - elevation: 580 m (1,900 ft)
- Mouth
  - location: Cardiff Bay
  - coordinates: 51.456°N 3.174°W
  - elevation: 0 m (0 ft)
- Length: 39.6 km (24.6 mi)
- Discharge
  - location: Cardiff Bay

Basin features
- Tributaries
  - left: Nant Muchud, Afon Clun
  - right: Nant y Drope

The River Ely (Welsh: Afon Elái) is in South Wales flowing generally southeast, from Tonyrefail to Cardiff.

The river is about 24 miles (39 km) long. The Ely's numerous sources lie in the mountains to the south of Tonypandy, near the town of Tonyrefail, rising in the eastern slopes of Mynydd Penygraig (Penygraig) and Mynydd y Gilfach (Penrhiwfer) and the western slopes of Mynydd Dinas (Williamstown), whose eastern slopes feed the Rhondda by Porth. The source of the Ogwr Fach lies just to the west.

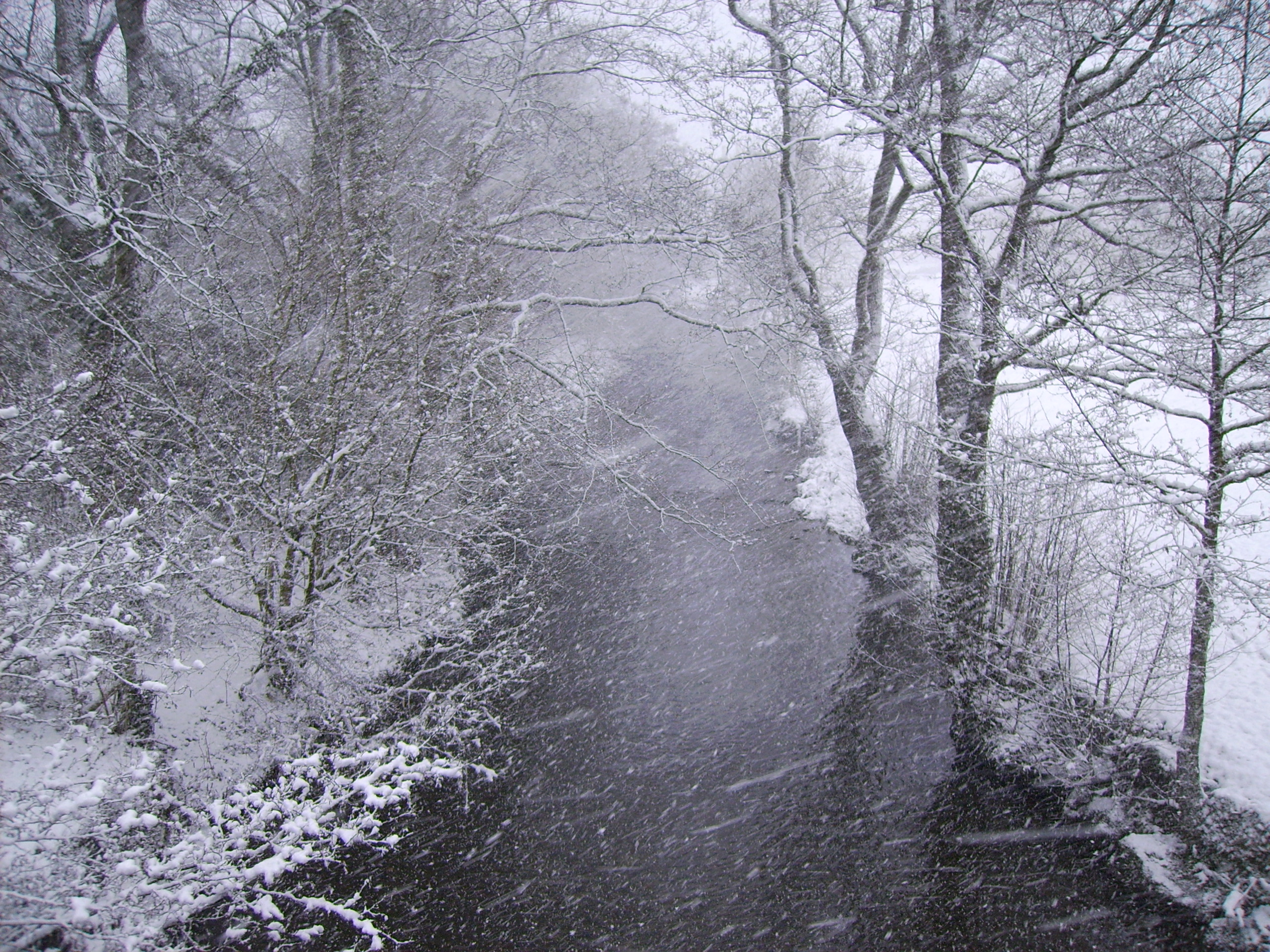
The River Ely at the Royal Glamorgan Hospital (2009)

After flowing through Tonyrefail and through the grounds of the Royal Glamorgan Hospital at Ynysmaerdy, it follows the A4119 road through the valley pass formed between Mynydd Garthmaelwg, to the west and Llantrisant, to the east. Flowing through Talbot Green, the Ely is joined by the Afon Clun at Pontyclun. Although numerous smaller streams join the river, the Clun is its only large tributary.

The Ely turns to the southeast on reaching the Vale of Glamorgan alongside the South Wales Main Line immediately south of Miskin, and after being traversed by the M4 motorway, it flows through farmland. It passes the St Fagans National History Museum and continues towards Cardiff and Ely (Welsh: Trelái) before flowing under the Vale of Glamorgan Line and into Cardiff Bay at Penarth Marina.

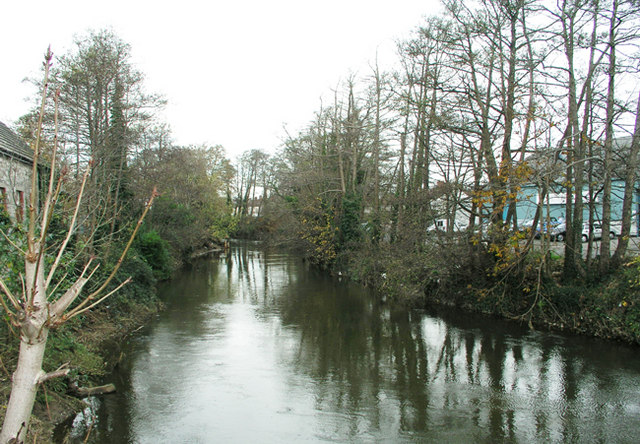
The River Ely, Cardiff

The Ely Subway is a closed pedestrian tunnel under the mouth of the Ely. The tunnel opened in 1900 replacing a chain ferry, and was used by workers at Cardiff Docks and Penarth Dock. It was closed in 1965.

== Quality ==
The Ely has had a long history of moderate to severe pollution from which it is now recovering. Prior to the 1980s it had received large volumes of poorly treated or untreated sewage from the urban areas in the valleys. Even after the construction of sewage treatment works at Miskin and Rhiwsaeson, the quality of the effluent continued to cause pollution until the late 1980s.

These problems were exacerbated by the highly polluting discharge from Coedely coke ovens. At the mouth of the river, the effluent a large paper mill rendered large parts of the estuary anoxic for most of the tidal cycle preventing the passage of migratory fish. The recovery of the river since that time owes much to the regulatory effort of the National Rivers Authority, and more lately the Environment Agency Wales, and to the massive capital investment made by Dŵr Cymru / Welsh Water.

== Ecology ==
As the pollution of the river abated, so fish populations slowly returned to the river from the many small tributaries. Roach, Brown trout, perch, chub, eel, grayling, sea trout and salmon and more recently some barbel.

== Floods ==
Video of a tree and branch catching centre on the banks of the river.

The river has flooded its banks on several occasions including 2008 when 27 homes were flooded, and in 2011, 2012 and in 2020.

== Ely Trail ==
The Countryside Council for Wales and Cardiff Council have developed a cycleway beside the river, known as the Ely Trail. The benefits are to allow people from urban western Cardiff easier access to the countryside, and for people in rural areas to have another commuting option into the city centre.

== Ely valley ==
The River Ely passes through the following:

=== Rhondda Cynon Taf ===
- Tonyrefail
- Thomastown (Tonyrefail)
- Coed-Ely (Tonyrefail)
- Ynysmaerdy (Talbot Green)
- Talbot Green
- Pontyclun
- Brynsadler (Pontyclun)
- Miskin (Pontyclun)

=== Vale of Glamorgan ===
- Hensol (Peterston-super-Ely)
- Pendoylan (Peterston-super-Ely)
- Peterston-super-Ely
- St. Brides-super-Ely (Peterston-super-Ely)
- St. George's-super-Ely (Peterston-super-Ely)
- Drope (Peterston-super-Ely)
- Llandough
- Penarth Marina (Penarth)

=== Cardiff ===
- Michaelston-super-Ely (Ely)
- St. Fagans
- Fairwater
- Ely
- Caerau
- Leckwith (Canton)
- Grangetown
- International Sports Village

== See also ==
- Leckwith Bridge
- Pont y Werin
- Cardiff Rivers Group
