= Tŷ Hywel =

Part of Senedd Estate, in Cardiff

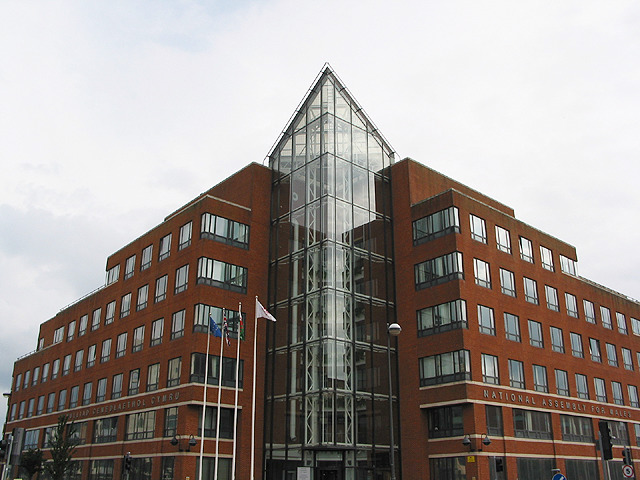
- Interactive map of the Tŷ Hywel area
- Former names: Crickhowell House

General information
- Location: 6b Bute Place, Cardiff Bay, Cardiff, Wales
- Coordinates: 51.46343°N 3.16237°W
- Current tenants: Senedd
- Opened: 1991
- Owner: Equitix Tiger English LP

Technical details
- Floor count: 6
- Floor area: 11,583 m^{2} (124,680 sq ft)

Tŷ Hywel (Welsh for 'Hywel House') is a building in Cardiff, Wales, used by the Senedd (Welsh Parliament; Welsh: Senedd Cymru; formerly the National Assembly for Wales). It is named after the medieval king Hywel Dda (Howell the Good), King of Deheubarth in South West Wales. The building was previously known as Crickhowell House (Welsh: Tŷ Crughywel), after the former Secretary of State for Wales, Lord Crickhowell. It houses Members of the Senedd and their staff, as well as staff of the Senedd Commission. The Welsh Government also operates from the building and occupies one whole floor and part of another. It is leased by the Senedd under the Government of Wales Act 1998.

The building was opened in 1991 and has a total floor area of 11,583 m^{2} (124,680 sq ft). It is built of red brick and is connected to the Senedd building in Cardiff Bay. Crickhowell House housed the temporary debating chamber for the National Assembly for Wales from 1999 until its new building, also originally known as the Senedd, was opened in 2006.

Tŷ Hywel is part of the Senedd estate in Cardiff Bay, along with the Senedd building and the Grade I listed Pierhead Building. Two covered link bridges connect the Senedd building to Tŷ Hywel. Construction of the link bridges began in September 2004 and they were completed by December 2005.

The former temporary debating chamber was reopened on 25 June 2008 by Charles, Prince of Wales, as Siambr Hywel, a youth debating chamber and education centre.

Between April 2025 and February 2026, Siambr Hywel hosted plenary sessions of the Senedd whilst the debating chamber in the Senedd building was undergoing refurbishment to increase its capacity to accommodate the 96 members that were due to be elected in May 2026.

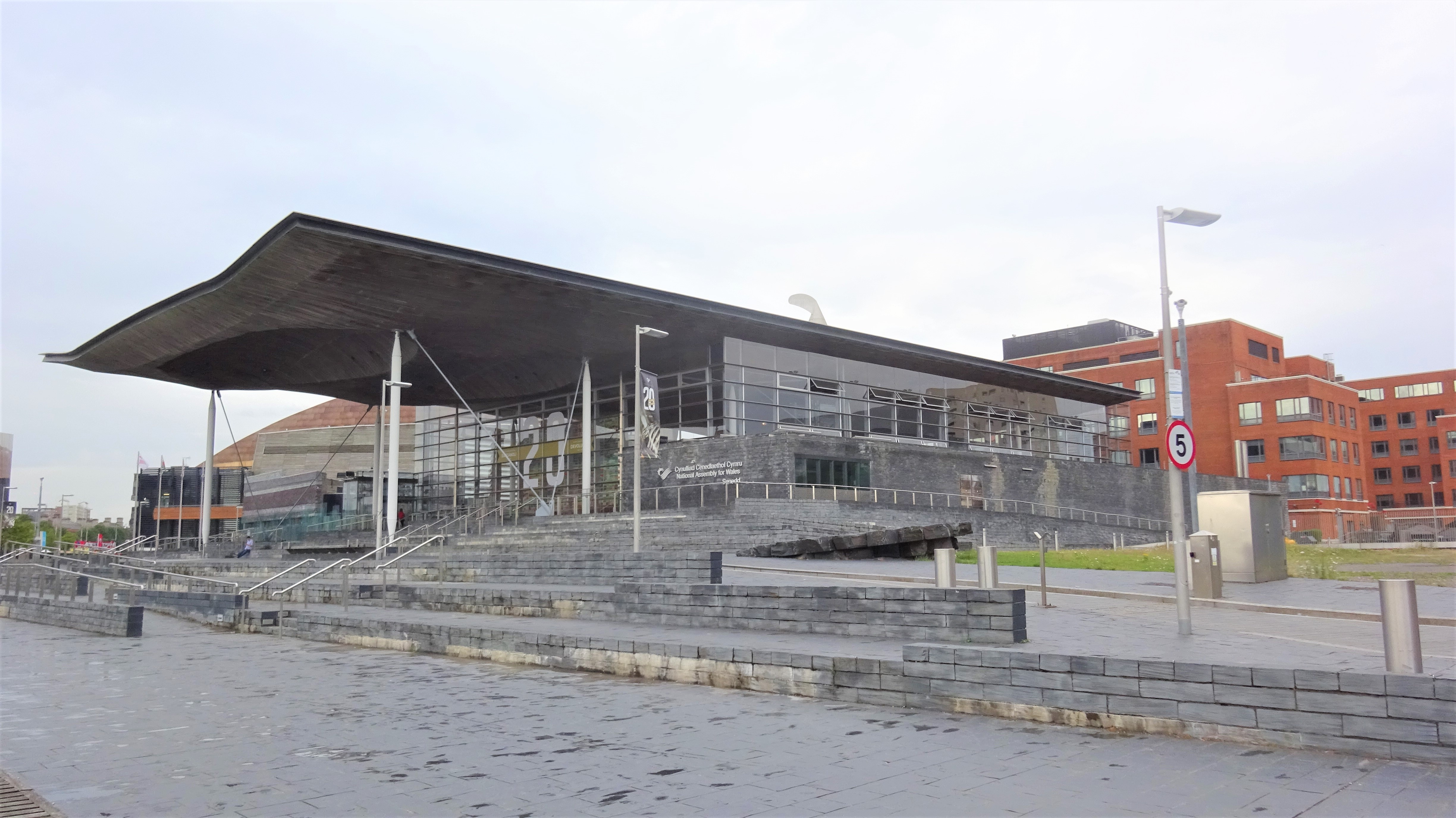
The Senedd building and Tŷ Hywel (right)

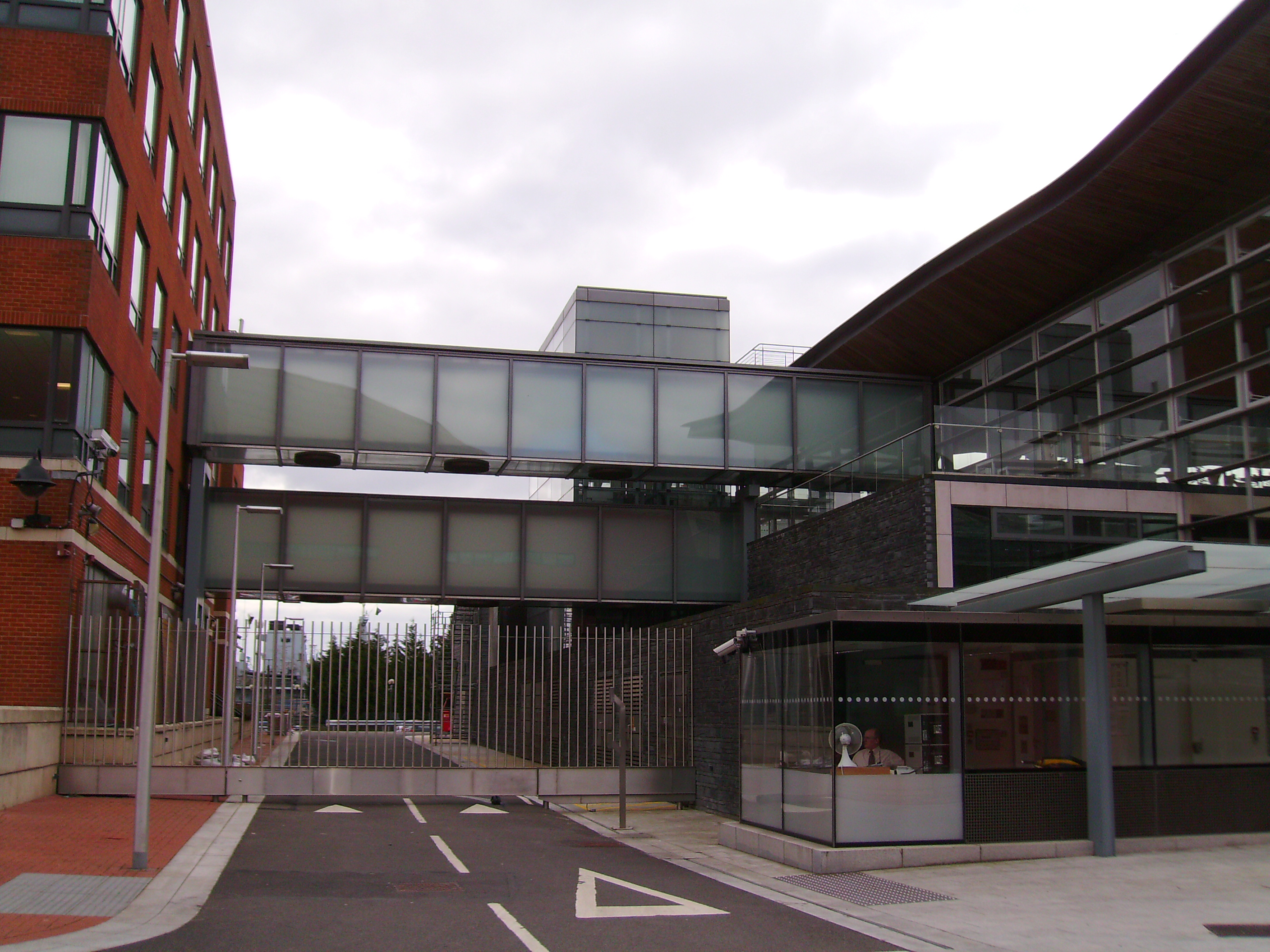
The skyways connecting Tŷ Hywel (left) and the Senedd building (right)

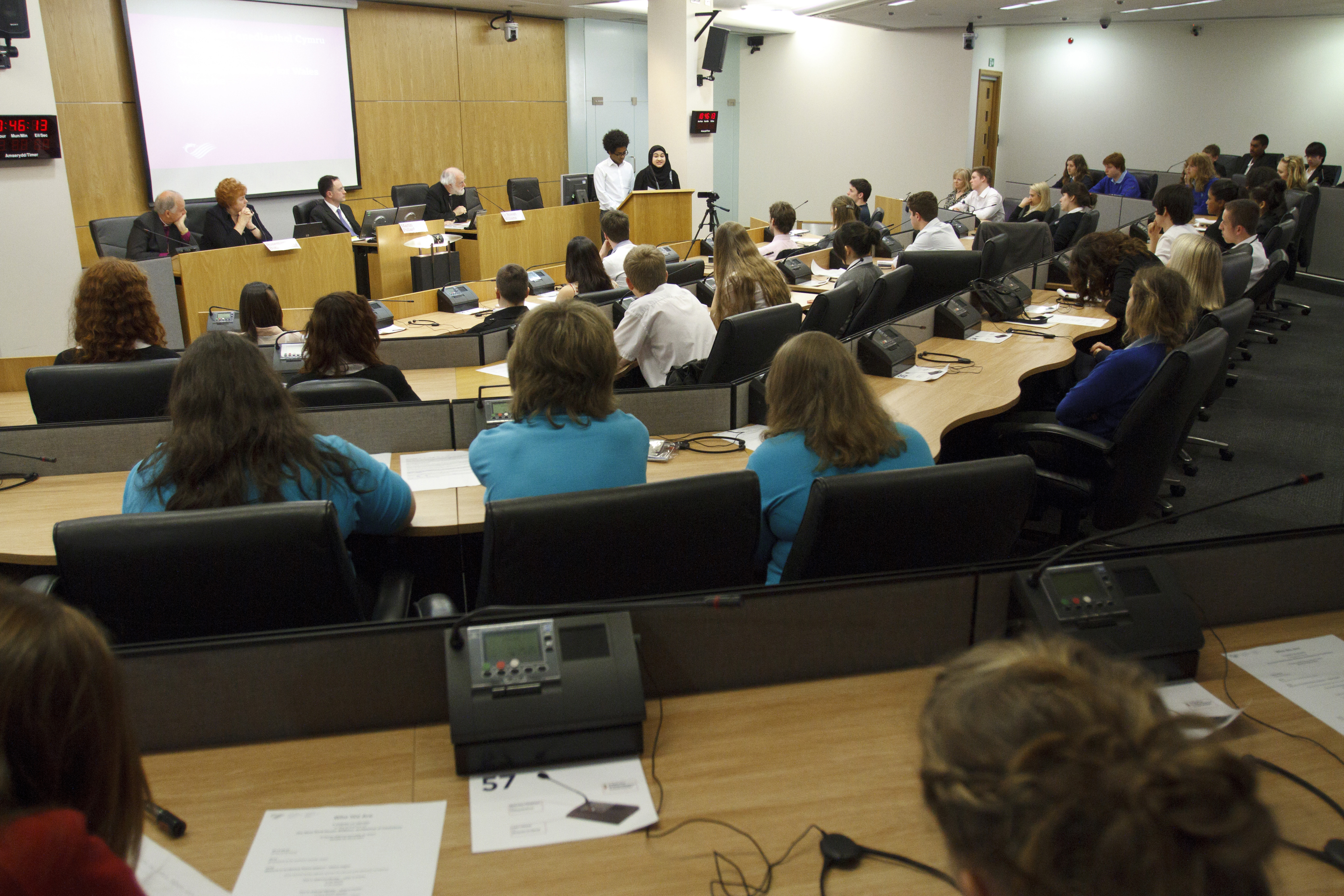
Siambr Hywel debating chamber (2012)
