= Senedd building =

Building housing the Senedd, the Welsh Parliament

- Adeilad y Senedd (Welsh)
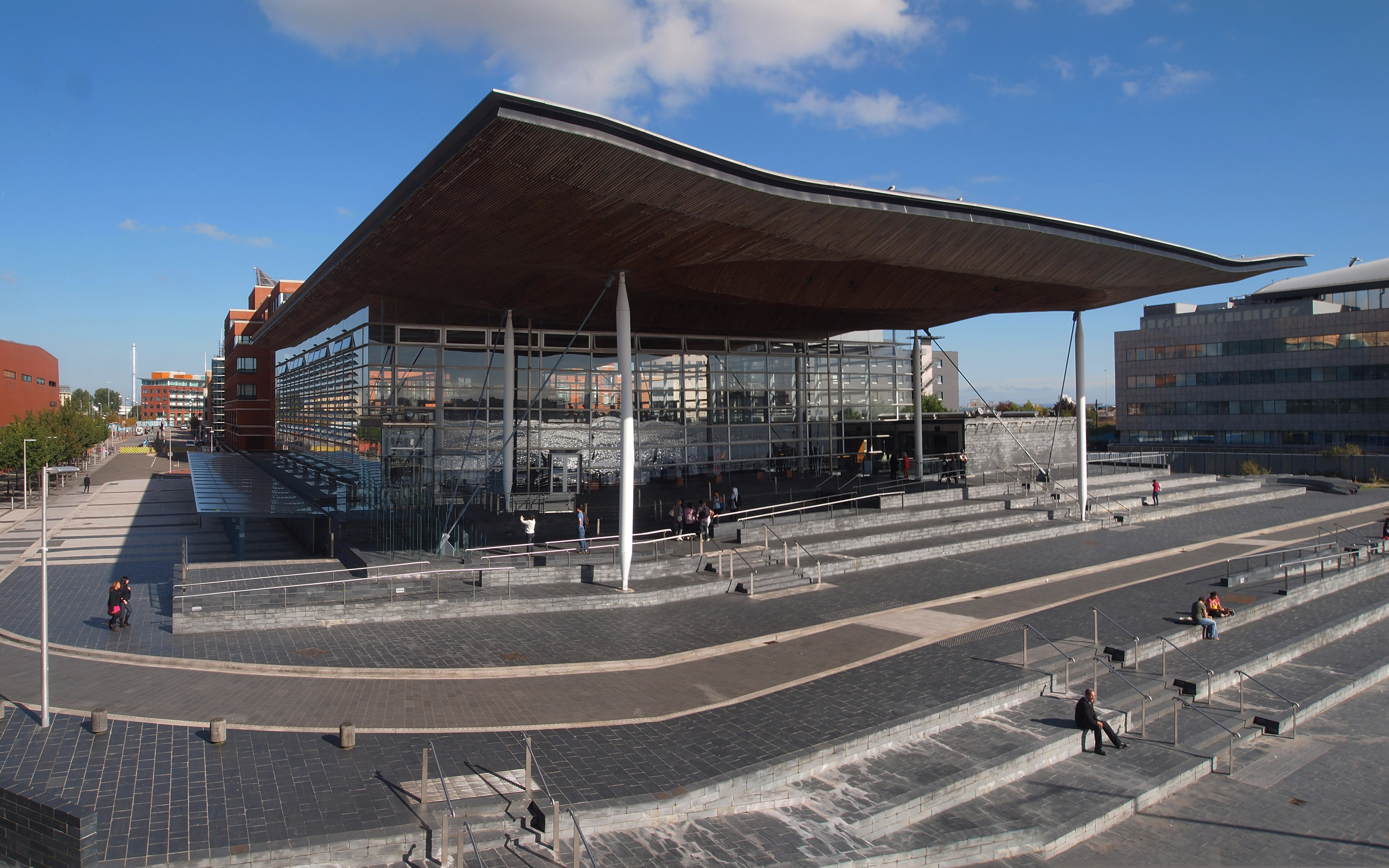
- The Senedd building pictured in 2011
- Alternative names: Welsh Parliament building

General information
- Architectural style: Sustainable architecture, High-tech architecture
- Location: Cardiff, Wales, United Kingdom, Welsh Parliament, Cardiff Bay, CARDIFF CF99 1SN
- Coordinates: 51.4637°N 3.1625°W
- Construction started: 1 March 2001; 25 years ago
- Completed: 7 February 2006
- Inaugurated: 1 March 2006; 20 years ago
- Cost: £69.6 million
- Owner: Senedd

Technical details
- Floor count: 3
- Floor area: 5,308 square metres (57,000 sq ft)

Design and construction
- Architecture firm: Richard Rogers Partnership
- Structural engineer: Arup
- Services engineer: BDSP Partnership and MJN Colston
- Main contractor: Skanska (phase 1); Taylor Woodrow (phase 2)

The Senedd building (Welsh pronunciation: [ˈsɛnɛð]), in Cardiff, houses the debating chamber and three committee rooms of the Senedd (Welsh Parliament; Welsh: Senedd Cymru; formerly the National Assembly for Wales). The 5,308-square-metre (57,100 sq ft) Senedd building was opened by Queen Elizabeth II on 1 March 2006, Saint David's Day, and the total cost was £69.6 million, which included £49.7 million in construction costs. The Senedd building is part of the Senedd estate that includes Tŷ Hywel and the Pierhead Building.

After two selection processes, it was decided that the debating chamber would be on a new site, called Site 1E, at Capital Waterside in Cardiff Bay. The Pritzker Prize-winning architect Richard Rogers won an international architectural design competition, managed by RIBA Competitions, to design the building. It was designed to be sustainable with the use of renewable technologies and energy efficiency integrated into its design. The building was awarded an "Excellent" certification by the Building Research Establishment Environmental Assessment Method (BREEAM), and was nominated for the 2006 Stirling Prize.

The Senedd building was constructed in two phases, the first in 2001 and the second from August 2003 until it was handed over to the then National Assembly for Wales in February 2006. Between phases, the National Assembly changed contractors and the project's management structure, but retained Lord Rogers of Riverside as the scheme architect. The building was nearly six times over budget and four years and 10 months late, compared to the original estimates of the project in 1997. Total costs rose due to unforeseen security measures after the 11 September attacks, and because the National Assembly did not have an independent cost appraisal of the project until December 2000, three years after the original estimate. Phase 2 costs rose by less than 6% over budget, and that phase was six months late.

== Architecture ==
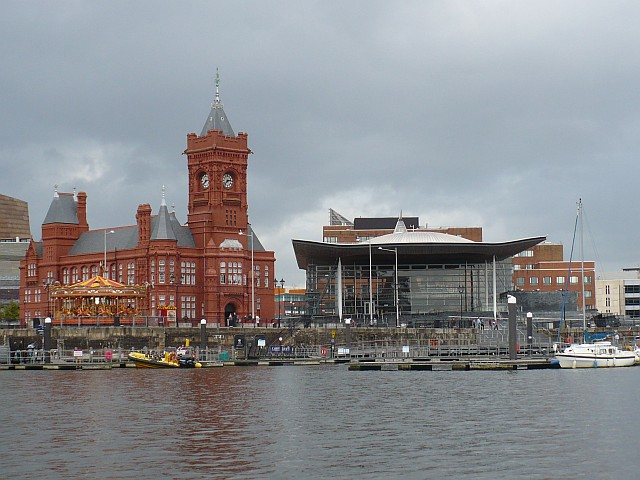
The Pierhead Building (left) and the Senedd building (right) facing Cardiff Bay

The Senedd building is in the former Cardiff Docks, about 3 kilometres (1.9 mi) south of Cardiff Castle. Cardiff Docks had been the largest coal-exporting port in the world, but by the 1980s with the decline of the south Wales coalfield, the area had gradually become derelict. By the 1990s the area was being transformed with the construction of the Cardiff Bay Barrage and was renamed Cardiff Bay.

The building faces southwest over Cardiff Bay, it has a glass façade around the entire building and is dominated by a steel roof and wood ceiling. It has three floors; the ground and first floors are accessible to the public and the underground floor is a private area for officials. The building was designed to be as open and accessible as possible, the architects, the Richard Rogers Partnership (RRP) said "The building was not to be an insular, closed edifice. Rather it would be a transparent envelope, looking outwards to Cardiff Bay and beyond, making visible the inner workings of the Assembly and encouraging public participation in the democratic process." The main area in the building is the debating chamber, called the Siambr, including a public viewing gallery. Other areas of the building are the Neuadd, which is the main reception area on the first floor and the Oriel on the second floor. The three committee rooms and the Cwrt are on the ground floor.

=== Environmental features ===
The design criteria required sustainability, including a design life of 100 years, the use of local Welsh materials, minimal energy consumption and waste, the use of renewable technologies and for it to be an exemplar in terms of sustainability.

In total, 36% of all materials and labour costs were spent in Wales, with about 1,000 tonnes of Welsh slate used. The environmental features of the building have allowed energy savings of between 30% and 50% compared to buildings without these features. The features include 27 pipes that were drilled 100m below ground, so that during cold spells, water is pumped through the pipes and heated to 14 °C by geothermal energy. The hot water is then pumped back up to the slate floor to warm the building to a constant temperature. In warm spells, the same system helps to keep the building cool. A biomass boiler was installed to use wood chips from recycled waste wood to heat the building, and rainwater is collected from the roof to flush the toilets in the building.

=== Interior and contents ===
Y Siambr

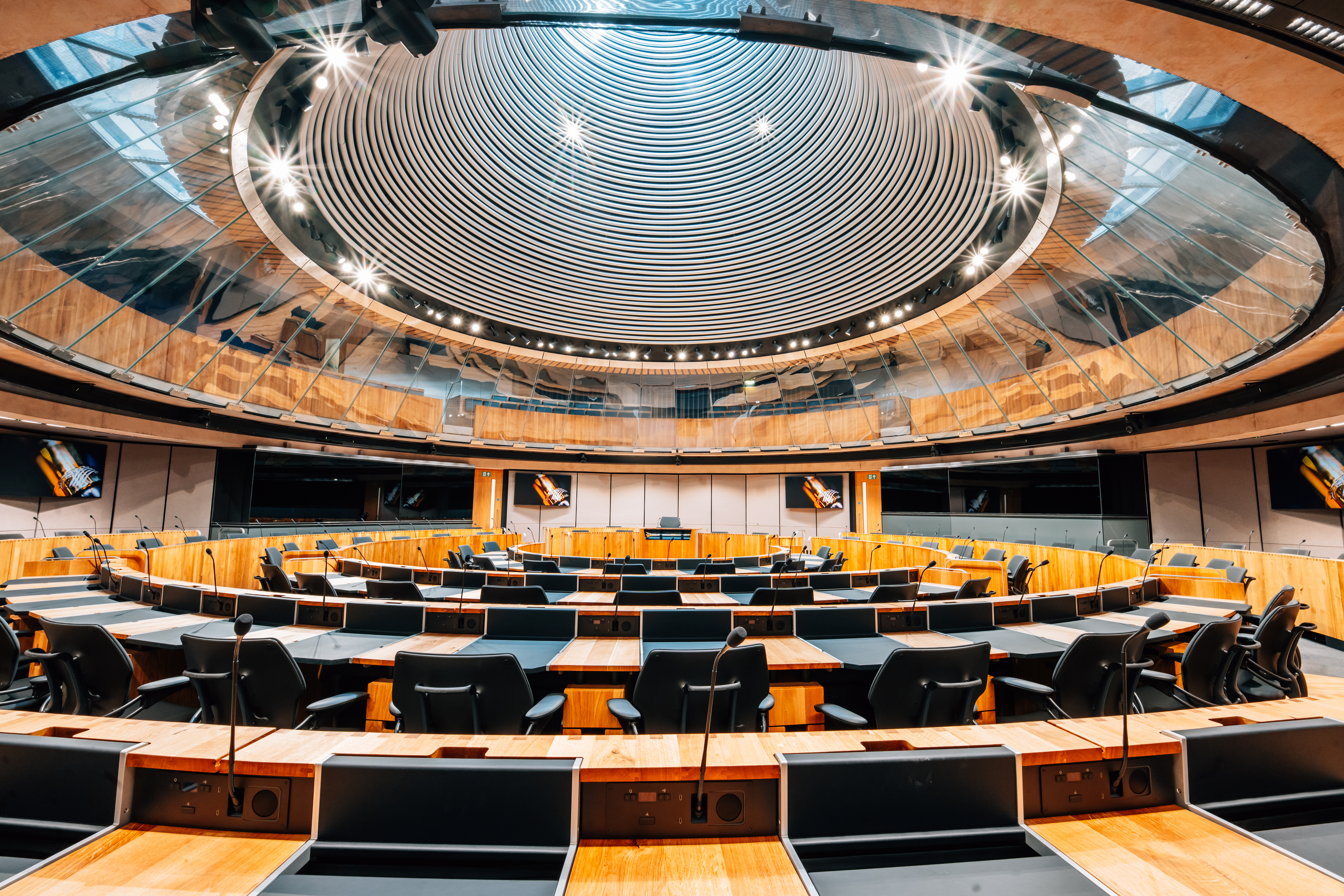
Debating chamber

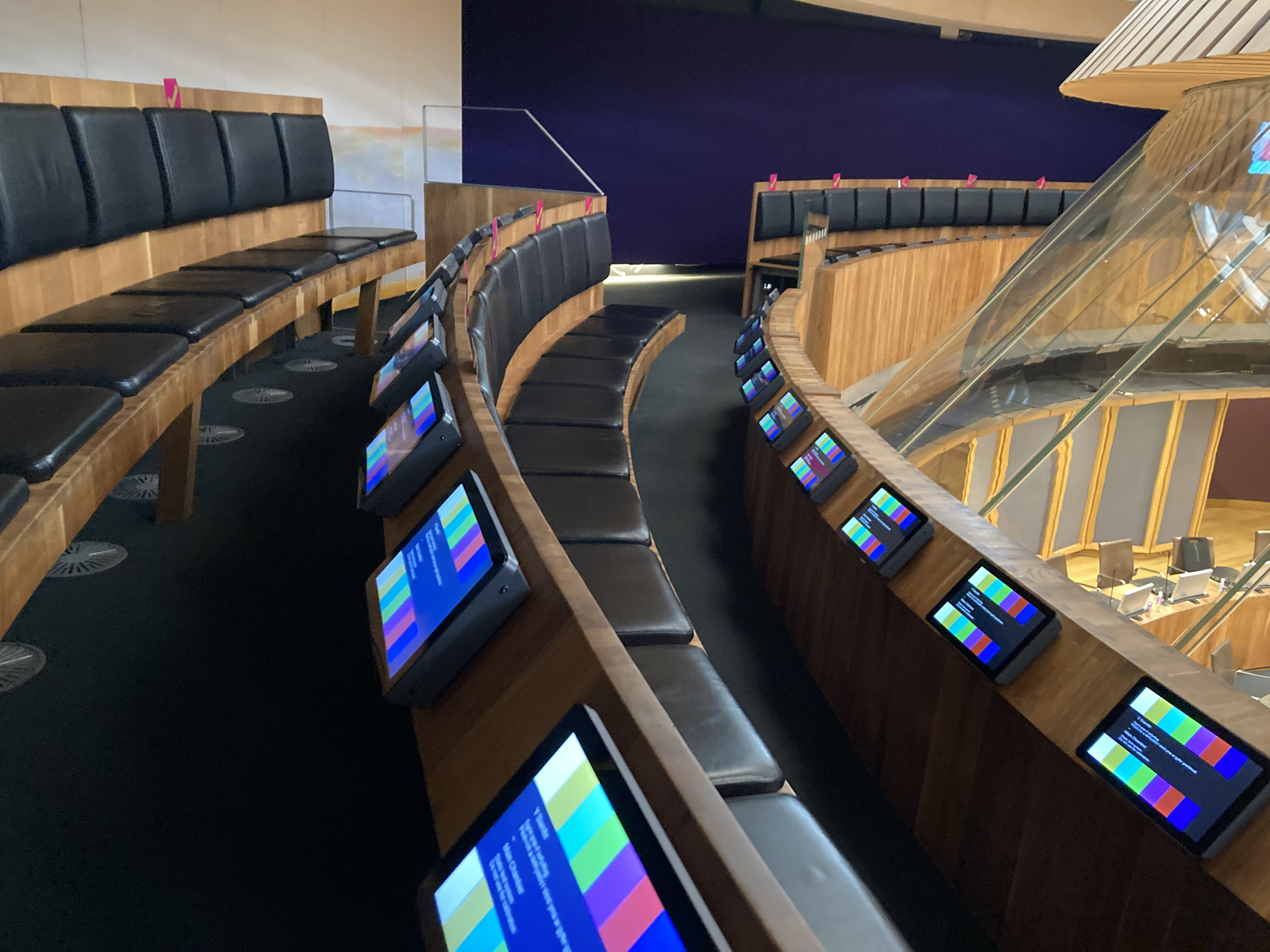
Public gallery overlooking the debating chamber

Y Siambr (The Chamber; Welsh pronunciation: [/ə ʃambr/]) is a 610 m^{2} (6,600 sq ft) debating chamber, which holds the Members of the Senedd (MSs) in a circular configuration under the cowl. On the level above is the public viewing gallery, which looks down on the debating chamber and is separated by security glass. The public gallery holds 128 people on two rows of seats. The MSs' desks and public gallery seating are made of Welsh oak in a circular configuration so that all MSs can see each other, which, it is claimed, makes debating less confrontational. Between April 2025 and February 2026, Y Siambr underwent refurbishment to increase its capacity to 96 in order to accommodate the larger number of members that would be returned in the 2026 Senedd election. During this time, plenary sessions of the Senedd are held in Siambr Hywel within Tŷ Hywel adjacent to the Senedd building.

Ceremonial mace (Byrllysg) at the Senedd
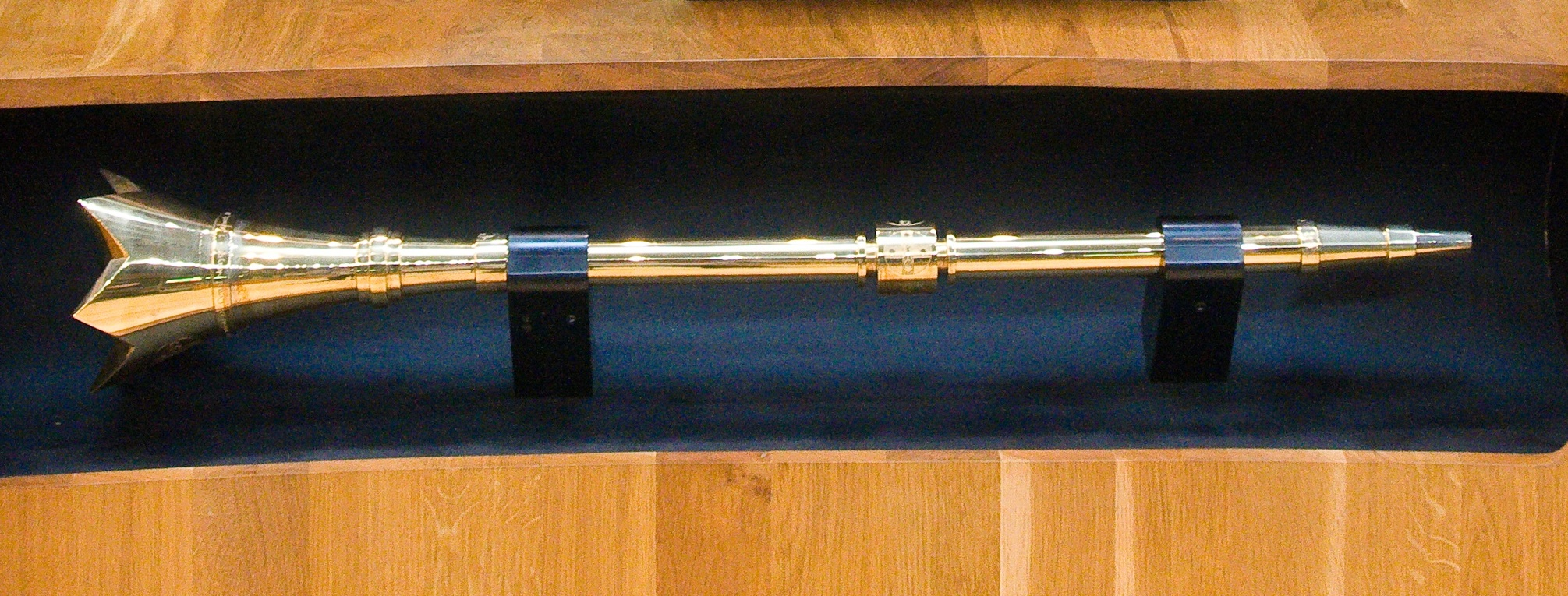
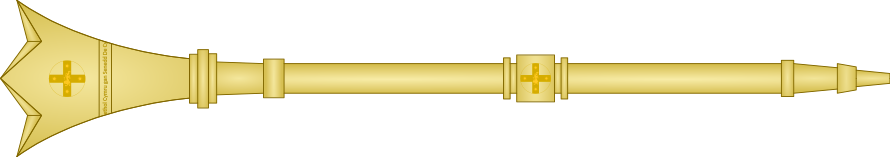

In front of the Llywydd's desk is the 1.3 metres (4.3 ft) ceremonial mace. Melbourne goldsmith Fortunato Rocca was commissioned by the Parliament of New South Wales in 2002 to design it. The mace took 300 hours to craft and is made from gold, silver and brass. In 2006, it was worth around £10,500 (A$25,000) and was handed over to the National Assembly during the opening ceremony.

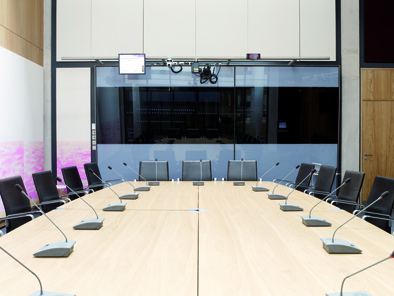
Committee room with pink fabric-covered acoustic absorption panels (left) designed by Martin Richman

All committee meetings are held in three committee rooms. Each can accommodate 24 people, although committee rooms 1 and 2 can both hold 34 when fully opened. Members of the public can access the committee room viewing galleries from the Neuadd, which holds 31 people.

Members of the public enter the building through Y Neuadd ("The Hall" Welsh pronunciation: [/ˈnəiað/]). This first floor level houses the public reception and information area. The reception desk features a large slate and glass desk and a canopy. Stairs to the left of the desk lead to the Oriel on the second floor.

Neuadd and Oriel

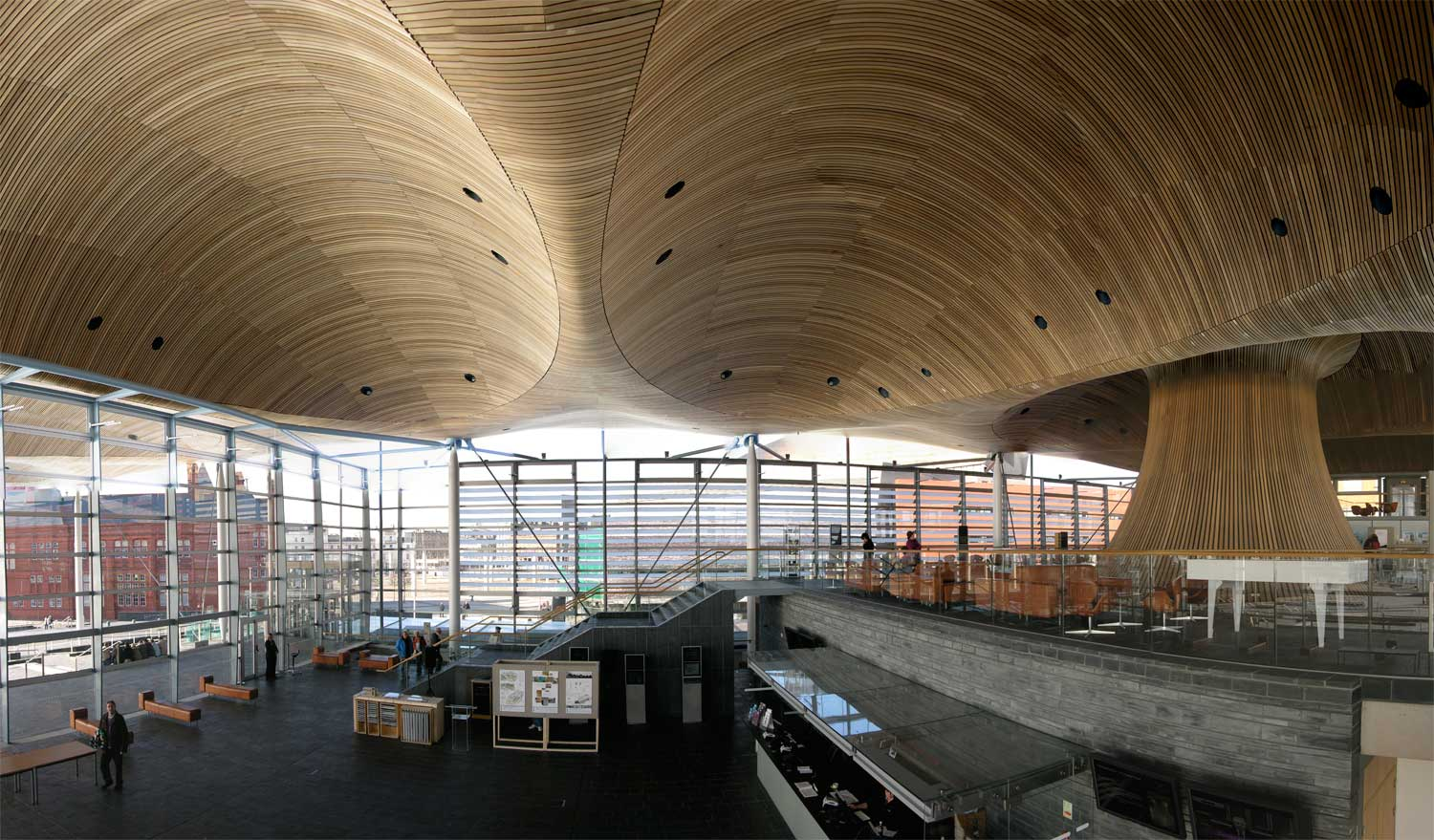
The Neuadd (left) and the Oriel (right) on the upper floor

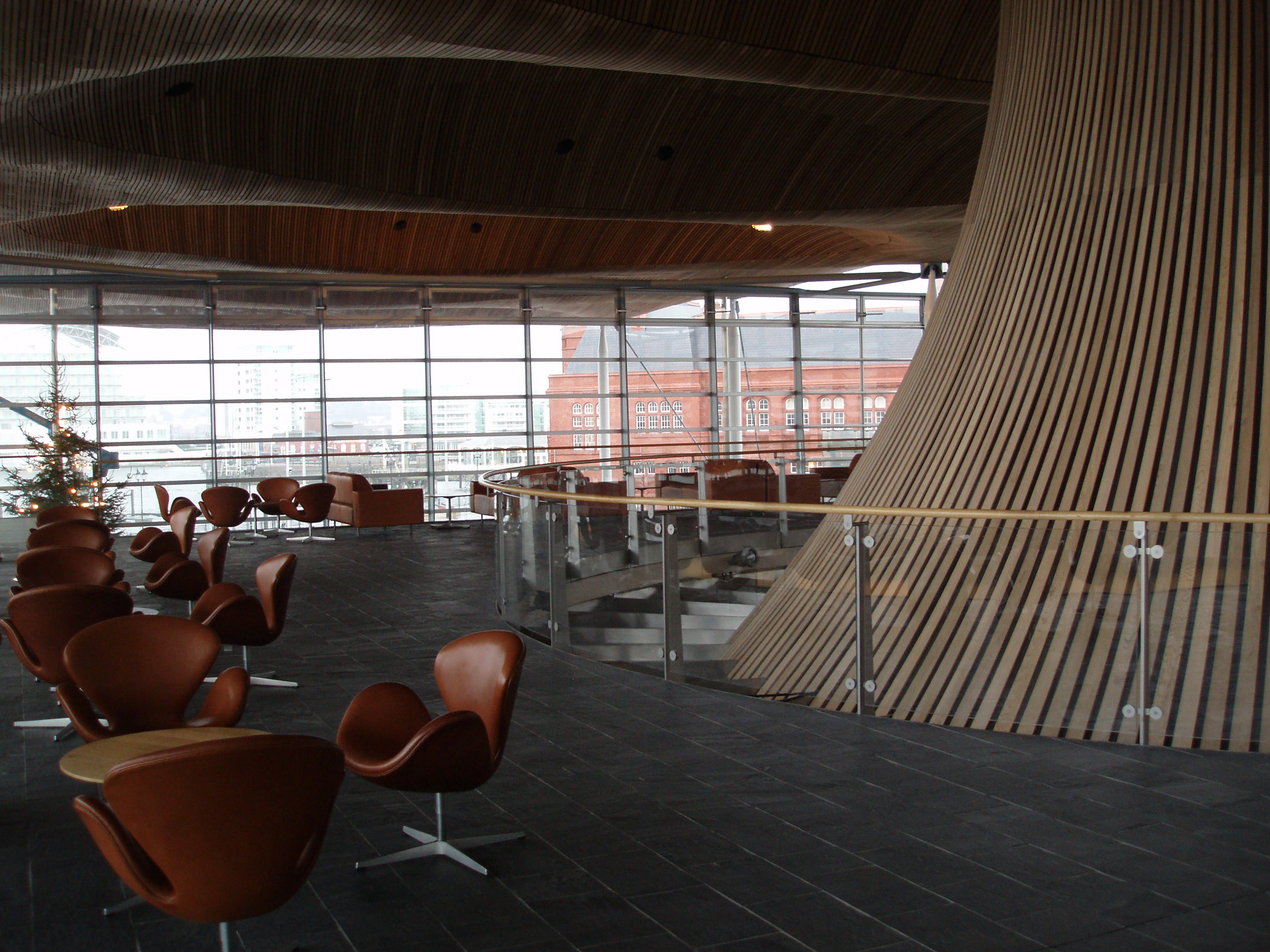
The Swan chairs in the Oriel

Yr Oriel ("The Gallery", from Old French: Oriol; Welsh pronunciation: [/ɔrjɛl/]) is a public sitting and exhibition area with views down to Y Siambr and committee rooms. The glass flooring, which surrounds a large funnel feature, enables visitors to look down into the Siambr two floors below. The Swan chairs selected for the Neuadd and Oriel areas were from Fritz Hansen, a Danish company, and originally designed by Arne Jacobsen in 1958. Y Cwrt ("The Courtyard"; Welsh pronunciation: [/ˈkʊrt/]) is an area on the ground floor with a members' tea room, a media briefing room, and access to the Siambr and committee rooms. It is accessible only to MSs, officials of the Senedd and members of the press.

An undulating ceiling made of Canadian-sourced Western Redcedar timber spans across the various sections of the building. It was manufactured and installed by BCL Timber Projects (sub-contracted by Taylor Woodrow).

=== Artwork ===
Commissioned artwork

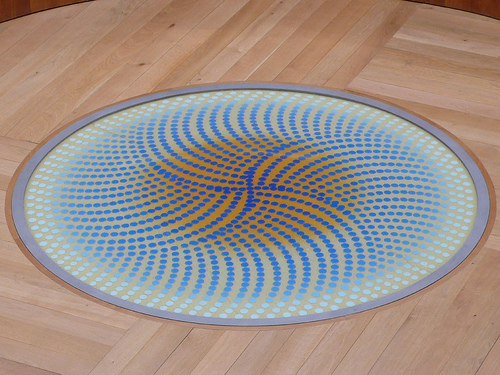
Heart of Wales
in the centre of the Siambr

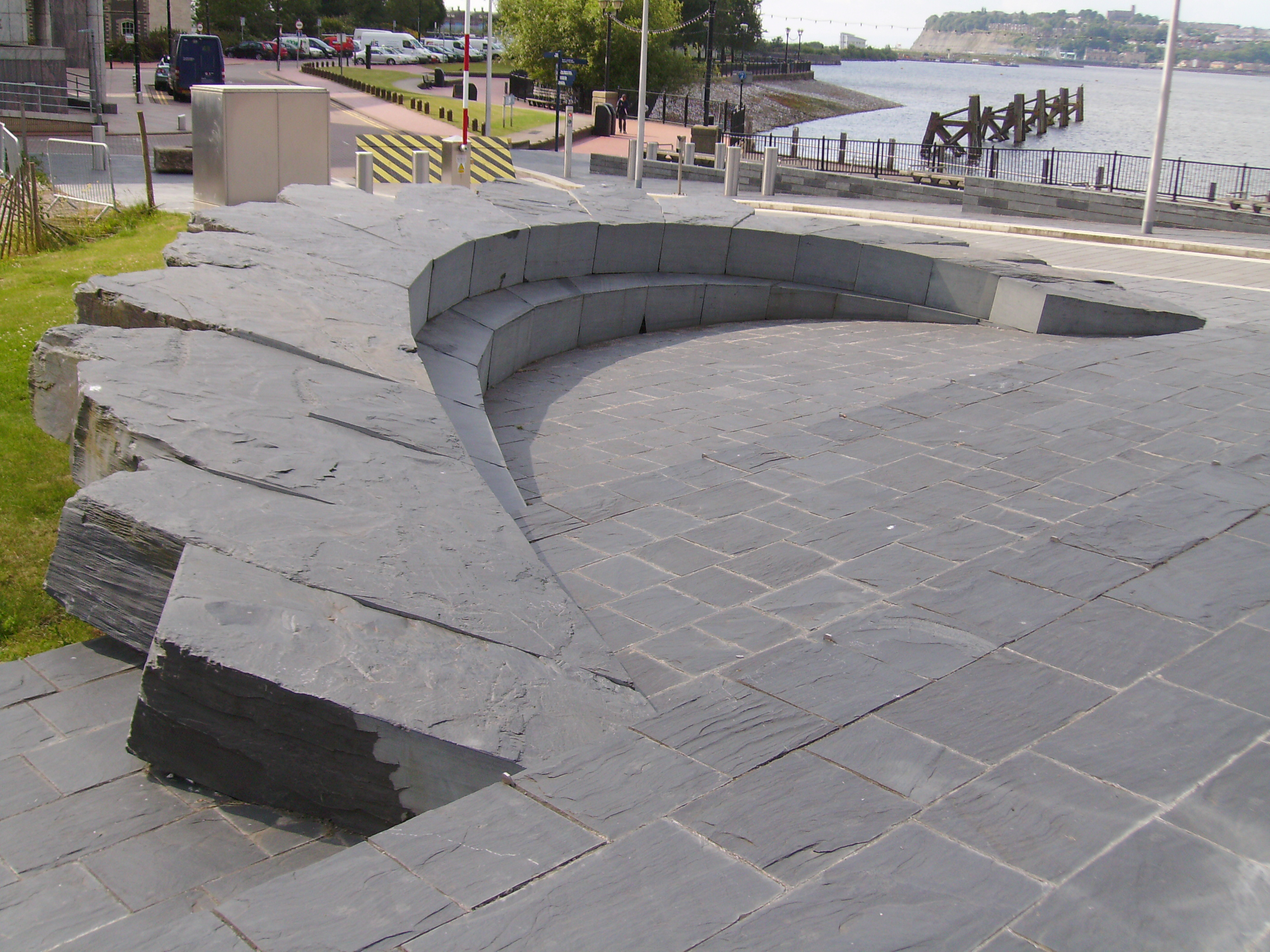
Meeting Place on the Plinth
in the southern corner of the Senedd building

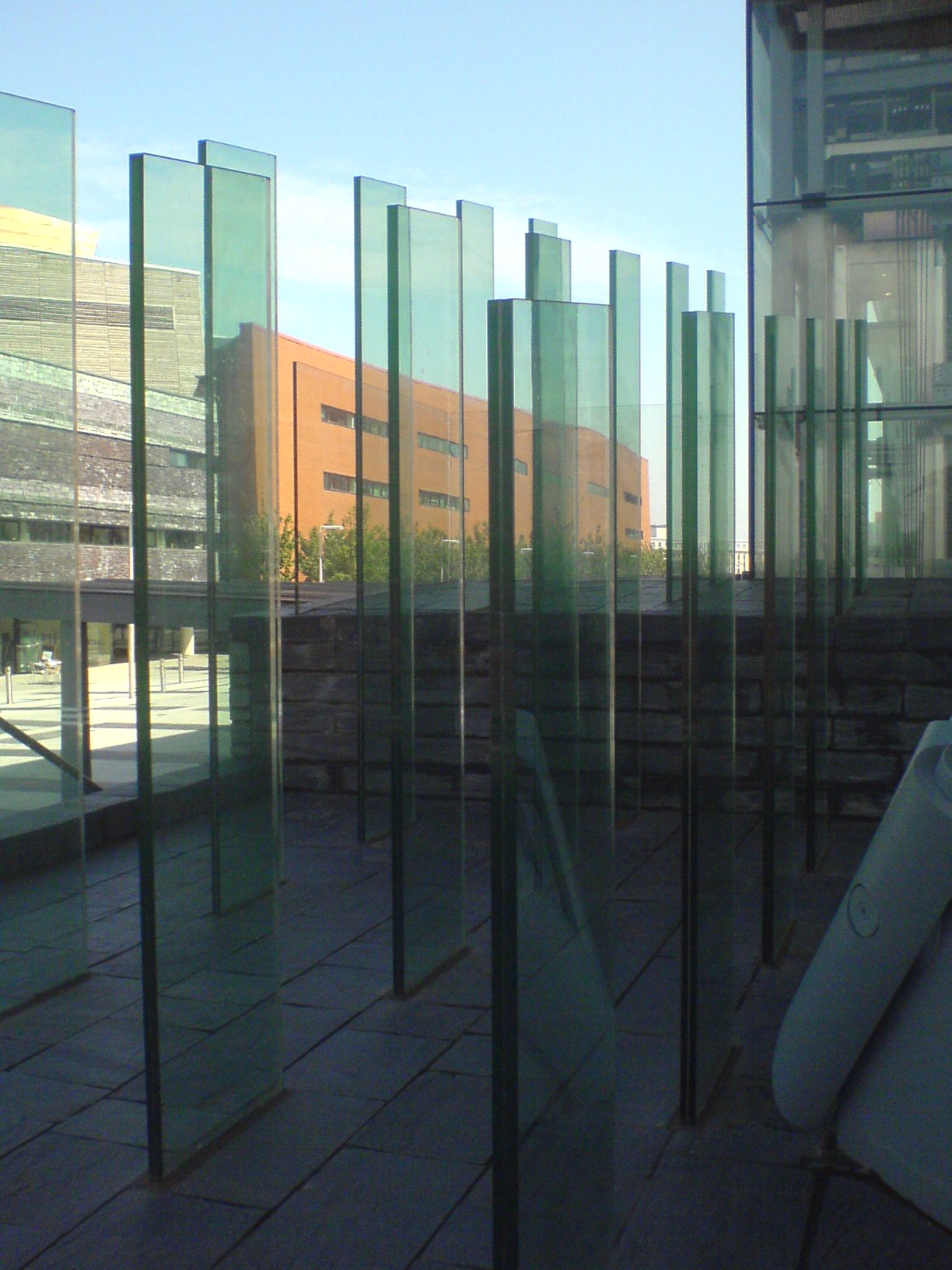
Assembly Field

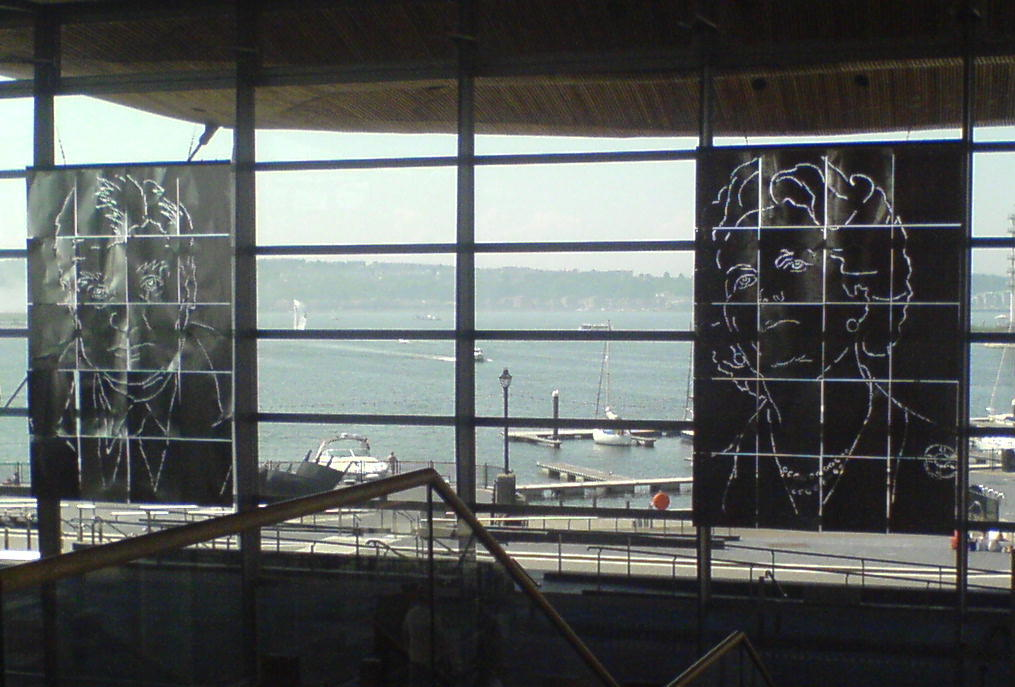
Temporary tinplate portraits of Aneurin Bevan (left) and Margaret Thatcher (right)

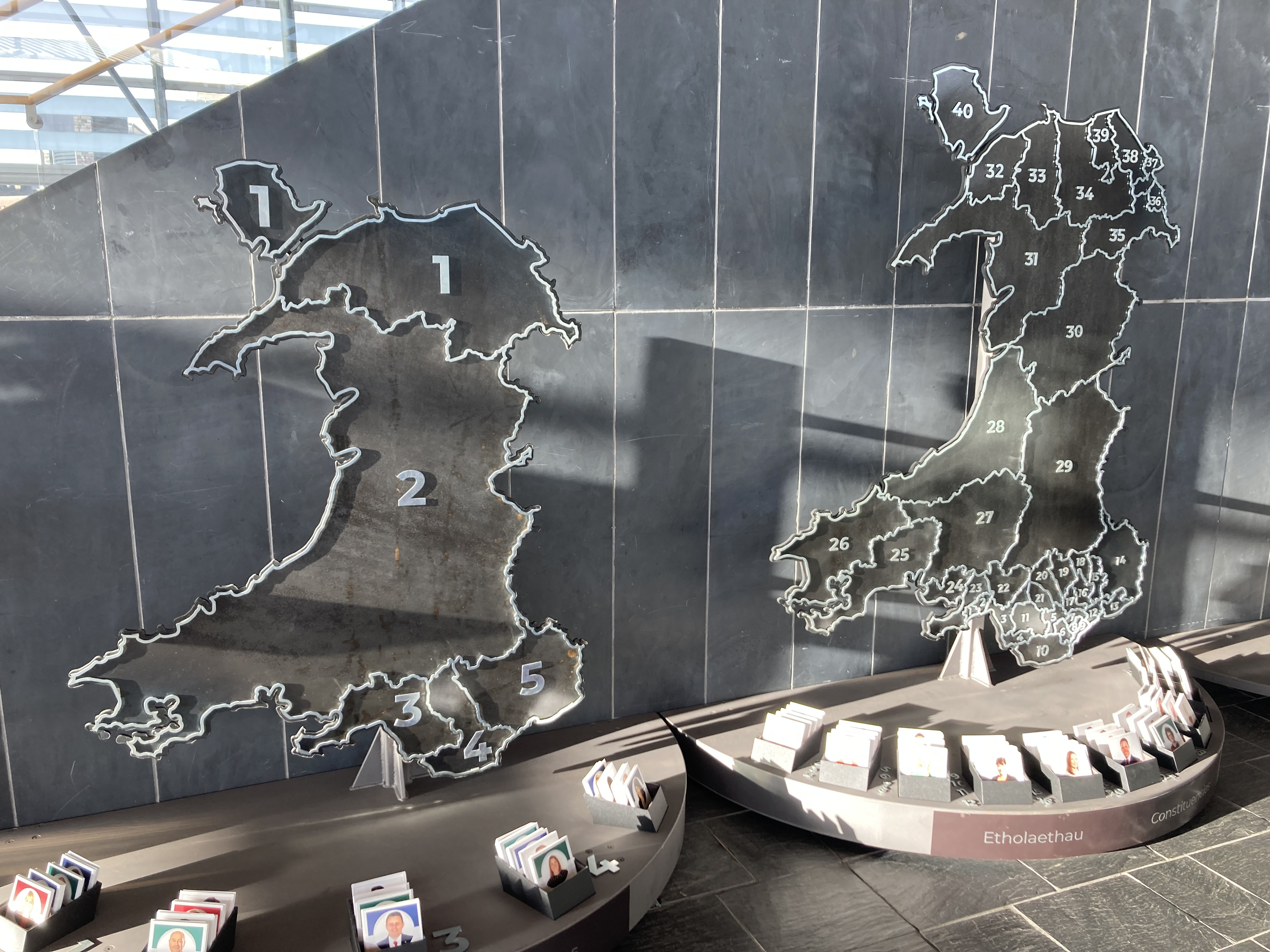
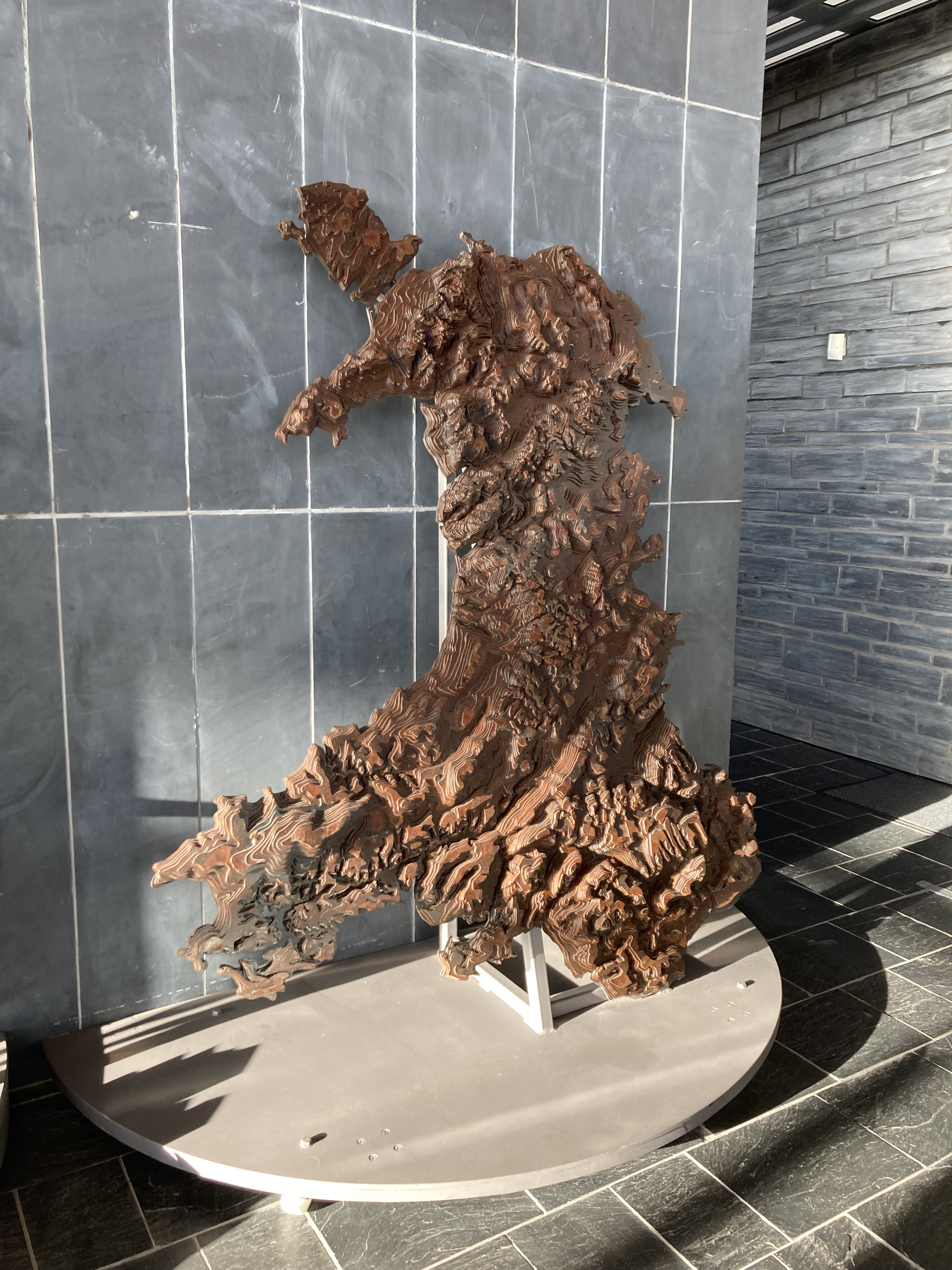
Three Maps of Wales in the foyer,
with the 5 electoral regions (left), the 40 constituencies (middle), and the Welsh landscape of mountains, hills and valleys (right)

Four pieces of art were originally commissioned by the National Assembly to be both decorative and functional; they cost £300,000 in total. The Swansea-based artist Alexander Beleschenko designed and created the circular and domed Heart of Wales for the centre of the Siambr. It is 2 metres (6.6 ft) wide, made out of blue and gold glass, and lit from beneath. Martin Richman designed and created 270 fabric-covered acoustic absorption panels, which were dyed and painted. American sculptor Danny Lane designed and created the wind hedge, Assembly Field. It has five parallel rows of 32 glass plates and was designed to have the practical use of protecting the public from high winds coming off Cardiff Bay. Devon-born sculptor Richard Harris created The Meeting Place on the Plinth, which is 45 tonnes of slate machine-cut into 39 slate slabs; the slate was from Cwt y Bugail Quarry in north Wales. It is an informal seating area south of the building. Harris said of the work, "I wanted to create a space that was to the side of the building, that related closely to the building but was very inviting for people to use – somewhere quieter that people could sit and spend some time."

In 2008, two temporary tinplate portraits were commissioned by the National Assembly for Wales. The artist was Dylan Hammond, and each portrait, one of Aneurin Bevan and the other of Margaret Thatcher measured 4.3 metres (14 ft) x 3 metres (9.8 ft). They were on display for 3 months.

The Welsh sculptor and blacksmith Angharad Pearce Jones designed and created the Three Maps of Wales (Welsh: Tri Map o Gymru) that were unveiled in 2021. They were made from Port Talbot steel at her workshop near Brynamman and are on permanent display. They consist of three large steel maps of Wales, the smallest shows the boundaries of the 5 electoral regions of the Senedd, the other the 40 constituencies of the Senedd and the largest being the landscape of Wales and weights 0.25 tonnes (250 kg) and is 2 m (6.6 ft) wide and just over 2 metres high. The largest map of the Welsh landscape is on wheels so it can be displayed in other parts of the building if needed.

== Etymology ==
The Welsh word senedd means 'senate', 'parliament' or 'synod', and is derived from the Latin: synodus, and ultimately the Ancient Greek: σῠ́νοδος. It is therefore related to the word synod, and not in fact senate, which has a different Latin root.

== Background and construction ==
=== First site selection process ===
Under the Laws in Wales Act 1536 Wales was fully incorporated into England and administered as a single sovereign state (the Kingdom of England) with a single legal system (English law). It was in 1964 that the Secretary of State for Wales was created as a Cabinet post, which gave some powers to Wales. A referendum was held in 1979 to decide whether there was support for a Welsh Assembly among the Welsh electorate. This was defeated with a majority of 20.2% for and 79.7% against.

After the 1997 United Kingdom general election, the Labour Government published a white paper in July 1997, called A Voice for Wales; in it, the UK Government proposed that "(the Welsh Assembly) headquarters will be in Cardiff ... (the) setting up (of) the Assembly is likely to cost between £12M and £17M. Additional running costs should be between £15M and £20M a year." On 18 September 1997, Wales voted in favour of a National Assembly for Wales in the Welsh devolution referendum, with 50.30% for and 49.70% against. The Government of Wales Act 1998 was passed by the Parliament of the United Kingdom, and was granted Royal Assent on 31 July 1998.

Shortlisted sites in the first selection process

Cathays Park Building

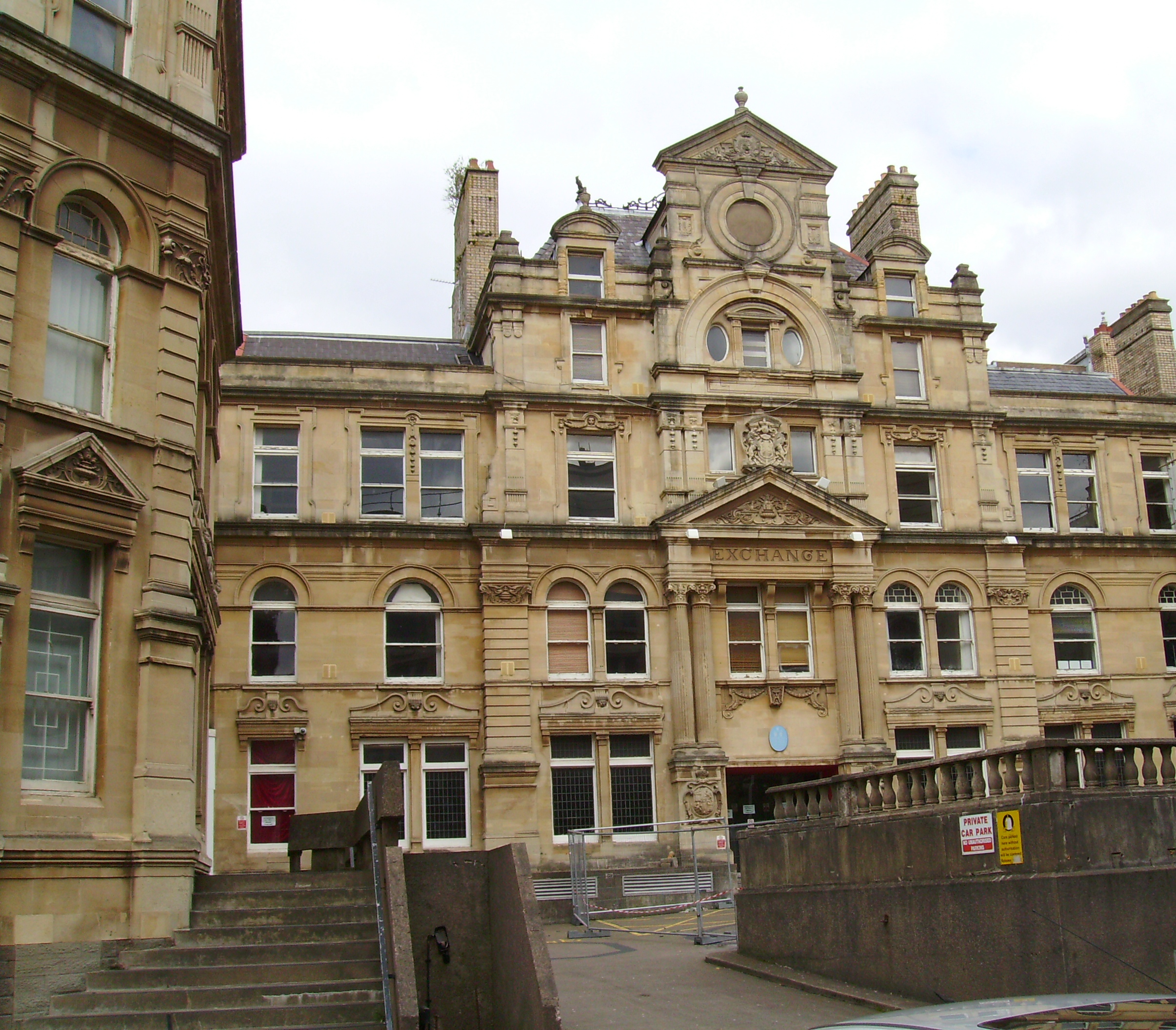
Coal Exchange

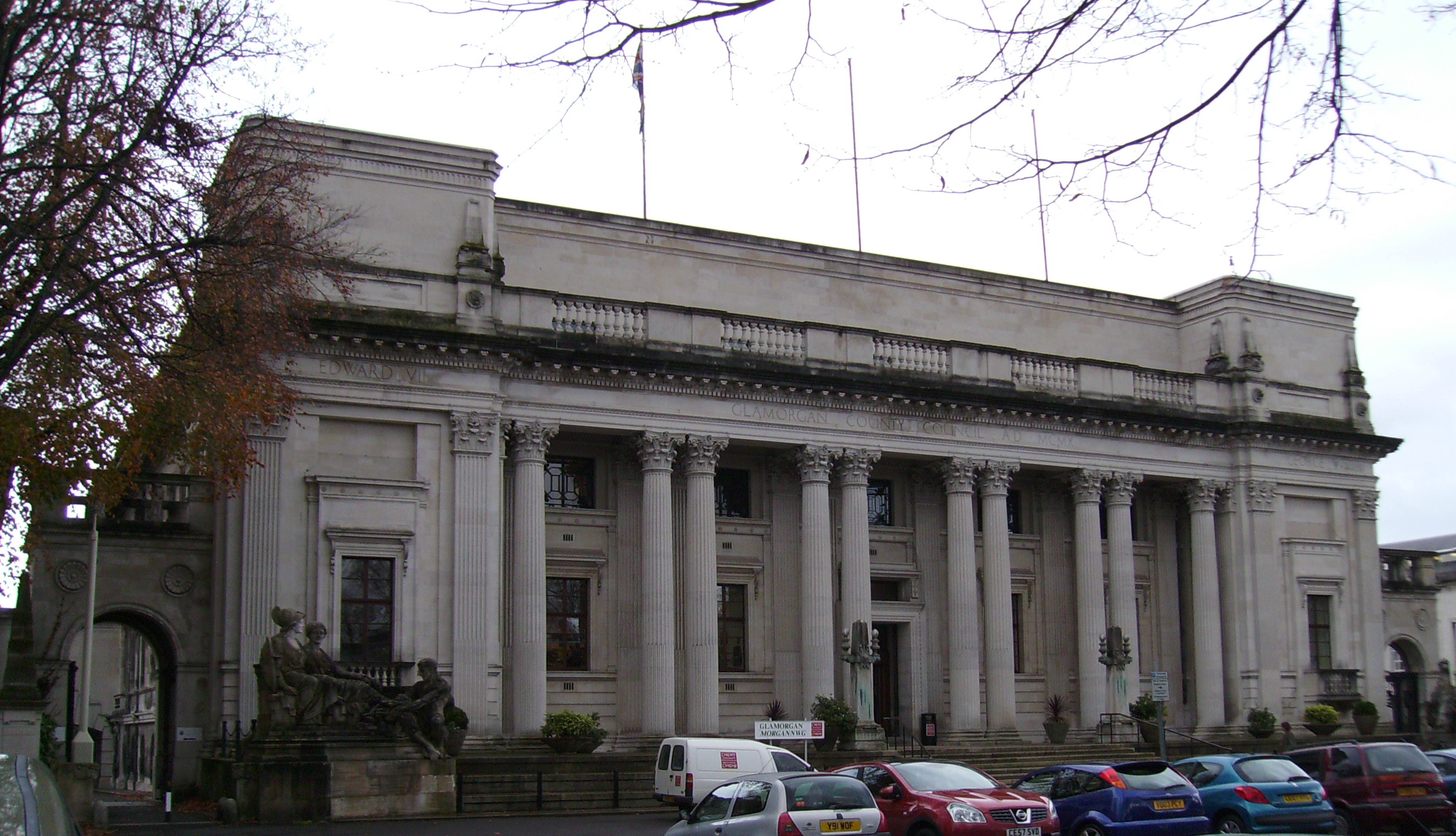
The former Glamorgan County Hall

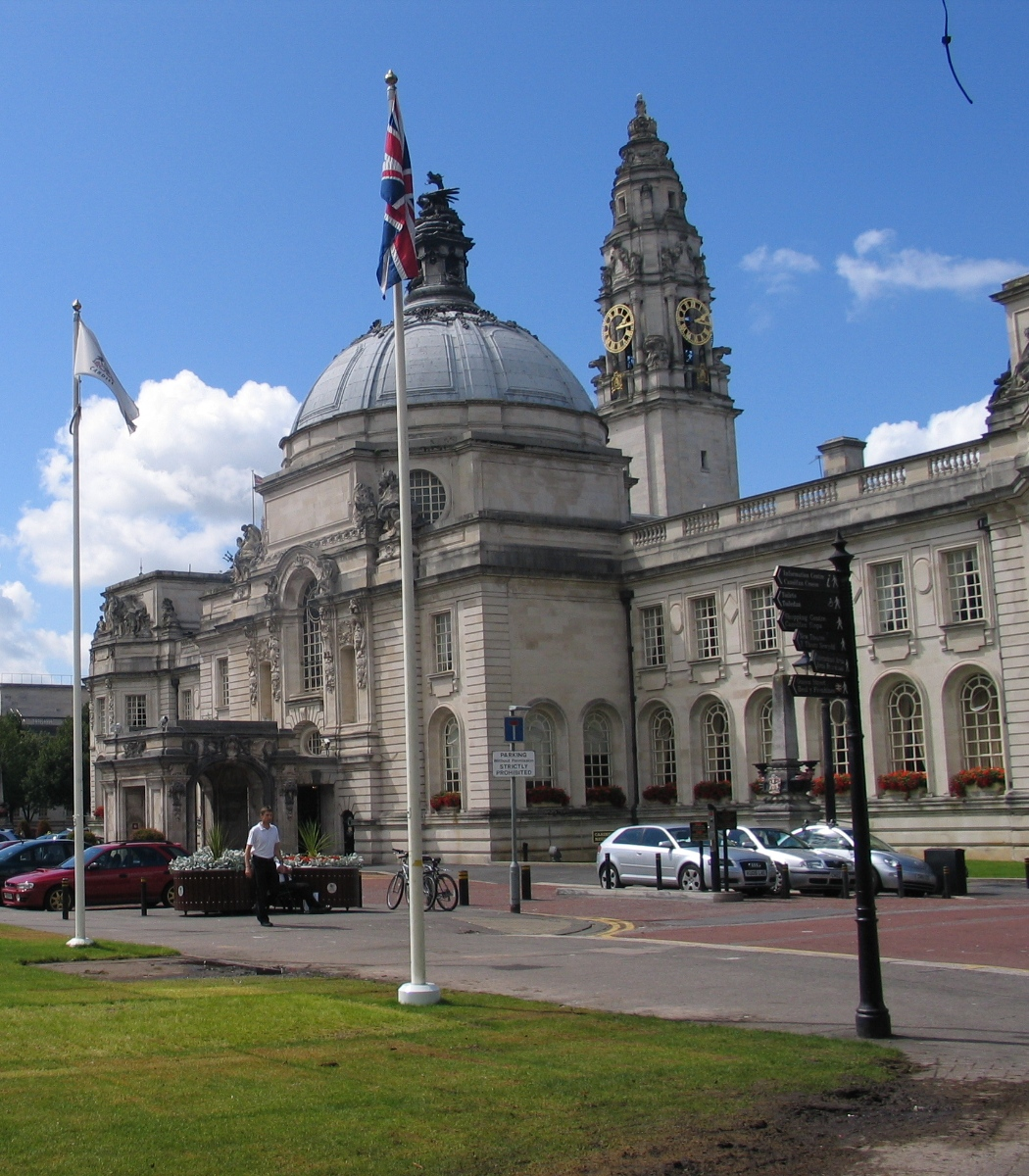
Cardiff City Hall

Before the referendum took place, the Welsh Office asked Symonds Facilities Management (later known as Capita Symonds) to investigate possible sites for a new Welsh Assembly. The study was carried out in June 1997, and it considered 20 sites. By August 1997, the Welsh Office and the Property Advisors to the Civil Estate (now part of the Office of Government Commerce) produced a shortlist of five sites for selection: the Cathays Park Building (the existing Welsh Office buildings); the Coal Exchange in Cardiff Bay; a site next to County Hall in Cardiff Bay; the former Glamorgan County Hall, Cathays Park; and Cardiff City Hall, Cathays Park, owned by Cardiff Council. In making their decision they considered the need for a space of 80,000 square feet (7,400 m^{2}) that would be ready to use by May 1999. The building was to be of appropriate stature, location and quality, and provide good access for the disabled and good staff accommodation that would avoid disruption to existing staff.

From the five on the shortlist, two sites were selected for further consideration: the Cathays Park Building and Cardiff City Hall. Cardiff City Hall was favoured because the executive and legislative functions would be separated; Cardiff City Hall was more widely recognised by the Welsh public and was a more prestigious building compared with the Cathays Park Building. The move to Cardiff City Hall would have also avoided a disruptive move for Welsh Office staff at the Cathays Park Building. The Welsh Office concluded that Cardiff City Hall would only remain an option if the initial costs were £17M or less, which was the top end of the estimate figure given in the White Paper. This would only be possible if essential works were carried out immediately and the remainder of the work carried out later. Cardiff Council would need to agree a selling price of £5M or less for this to be possible.

There were discussions between the leader of Cardiff Council, Russell Goodway, and the Secretary of State for Wales, Ron Davies MP. The two disagreed on the valuation of the site: Davies offered what was believed to be the market price of £3.5 million; Goodway demanded £14 million for the relocation of Council staff. In October 1997, both the Welsh Office and Cardiff Council agreed to the District Valuer providing an independent assessment of the market value of Cardiff City Hall and the cost of staff relocating to an equivalent standard of accommodation. The District Valuer advised that the open market value of Cardiff City Hall was £3.5 million. There was not enough information available for the District Valuer to make a decision. A bid of £2.5 million was made by the Welsh Office on 14 November 1997, which was rejected on 21 November 1997. A final offer of £3.5 million was made on 24 November and this too was rejected by Cardiff County Council. Davies later announced his decision not to go ahead with the Cardiff City Hall site for the National Assembly.

=== Second site selection process ===
Proposed sites in the second selection process

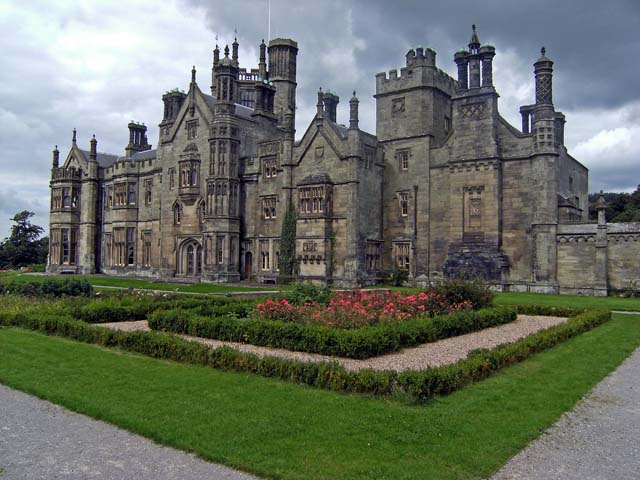
Margam Castle

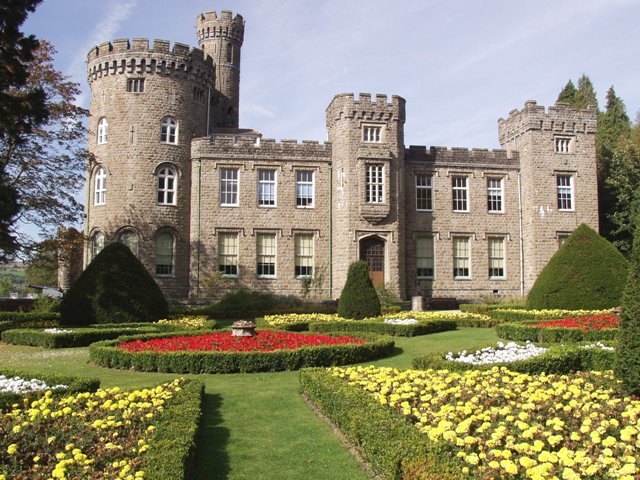
Cyfarthfa Castle

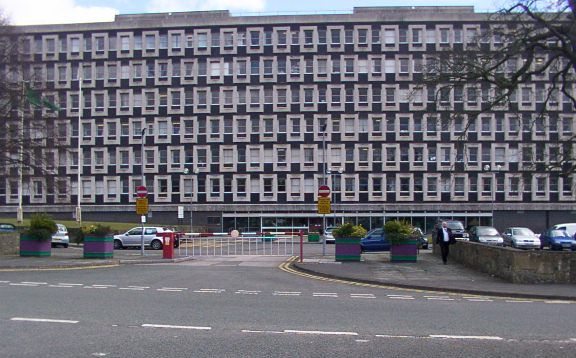
County Hall, Mold

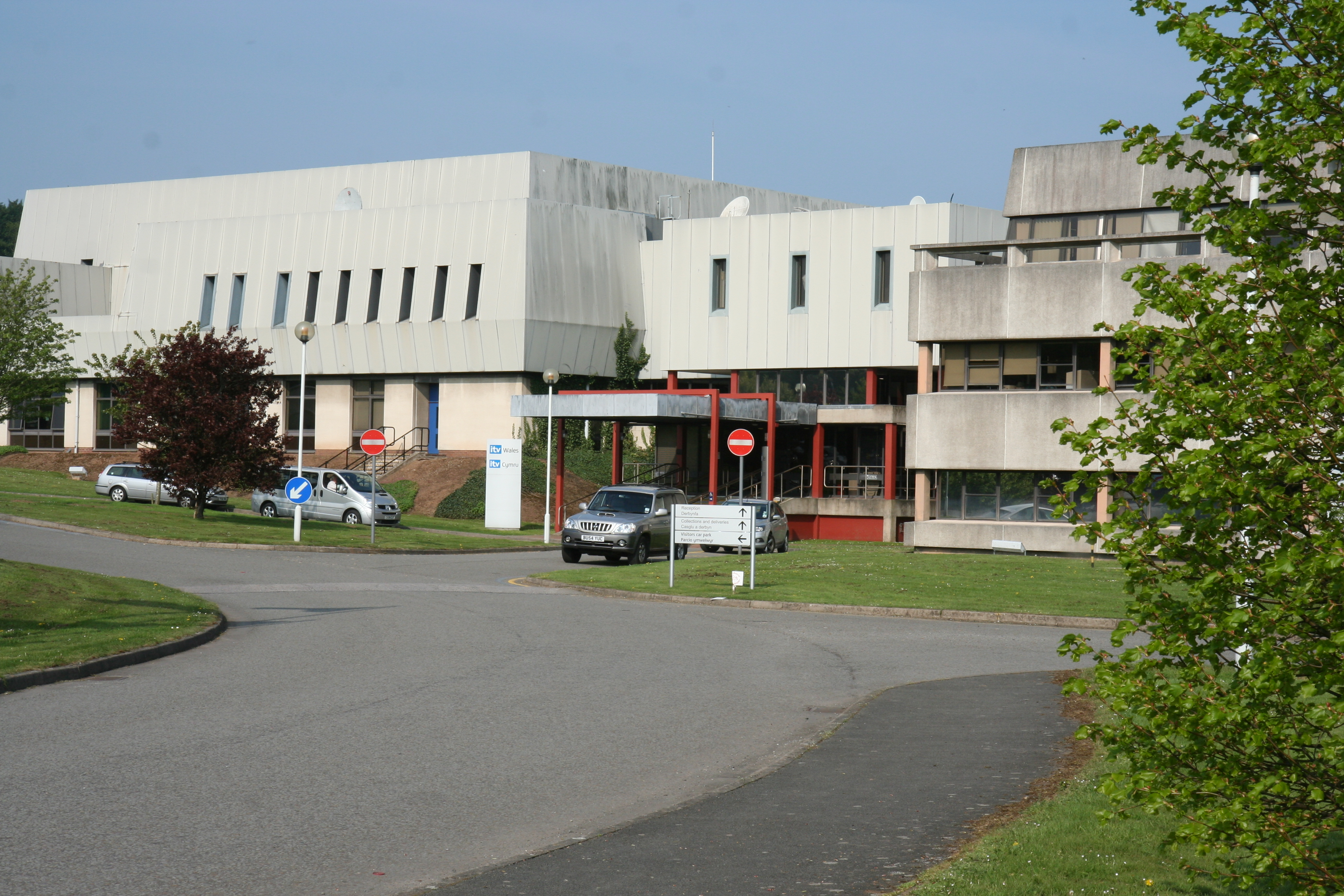
The former HTV studios in Culverhouse Cross, Cardiff

In December 1997, the Welsh Office invited proposals from Wales for the National Assembly building. 24 proposals were received; 14 came from the private sector and government-owned corporations including HTV Group, Grosvenor Waterside (owned by Associated British Ports), Tarmac Developments, Cardiff Bay Development Corporation and Cardiff Airport. Nine local authorities in Wales made proposals including the Guildhall proposed by Swansea Council, Cardiff City Hall by Cardiff Council, Margam Castle by Neath Port Talbot Council, Cyfarthfa Castle by Merthyr Tydfil Council; proposals also came from Wrexham Council, Flintshire County Council who proposed two sites at Ewloe and Mold, Rhondda Cynon Taf Council, Powys County Council and five sites from Bridgend Council. The Grosvenor Waterside proposal, known as Capital Waterside, included the Pierhead Building, Crickhowell House and Site 1E, which would become the site of the new debating chamber.

Shortlisted sites in the second selection process

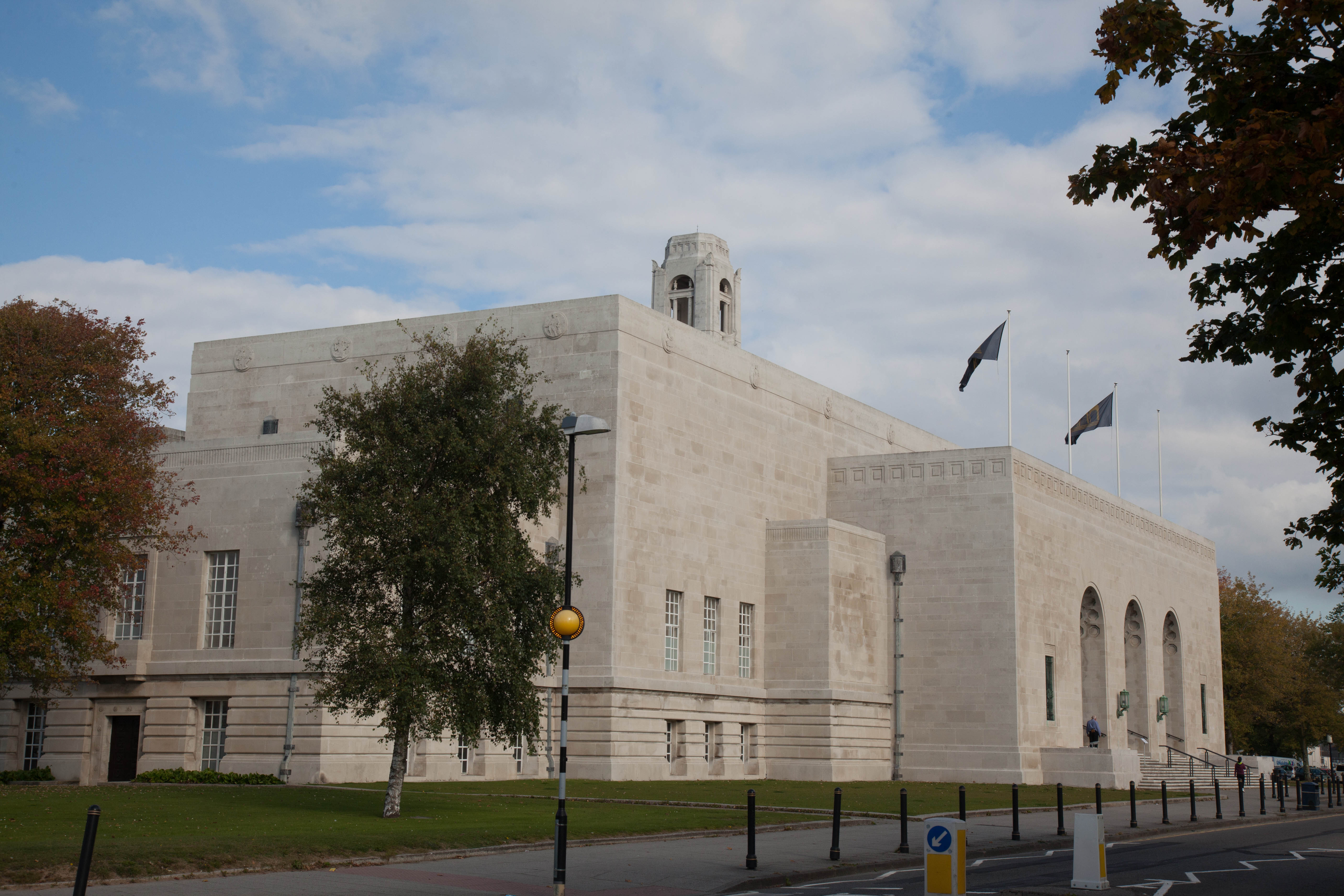
The Guildhall

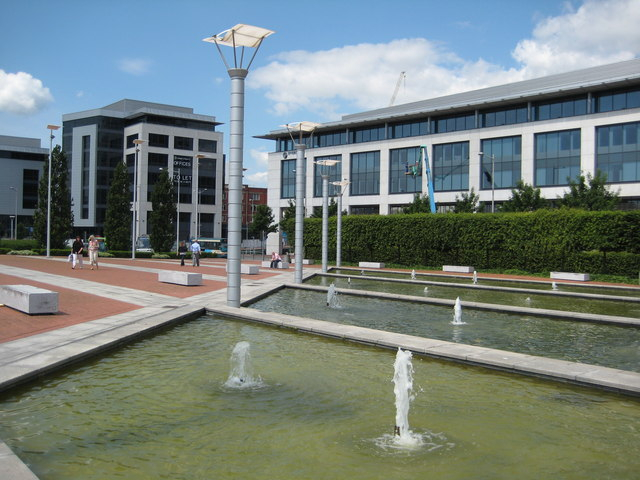
Callaghan Square

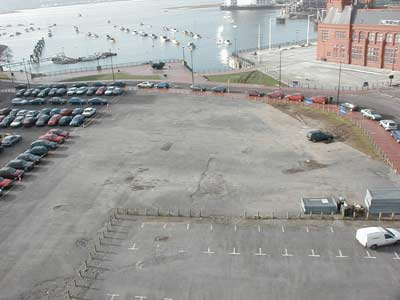
Site 1E

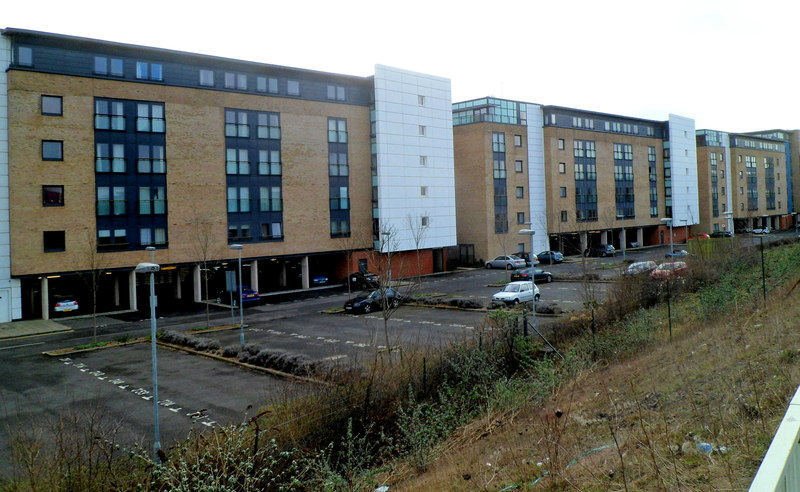
Prospect Place

All the proposals were reviewed by the Welsh Office, who rejected sites due to poor location, accommodation or cost. A shortlist of ten sites were further reviewed. These were: Capital Waterside (now known as Cardiff Waterside); Cardiff City Hall; a site next to County Hall; Bute Square (now known as Callaghan Square); Prospect Place; Cardiff Gate Business Park; Kingsway and the Coal Exchange all in Cardiff, with the HTV site at Culverhouse Cross, and the Guildhall in Swansea.

Davies announced on 13 March 1998 that the new National Assembly building would be in Cardiff. He said that the Cardiff proposals were "too compelling to resist", because "in making this decision, I am mindful that Wales has invested 40 years in promoting Cardiff as our capital city." The National Assembly building would be either in Bute Square or Capital Waterside. The Welsh Office decided that the Capital Waterside proposal carried less risk and would cost less than the Bute Square proposal. Capital Waterside would cost £43.9M, while Bute Square would cost £52.5M. On 28 April 1998, Davies announced that the site of the National Assembly building would be Capital Waterside. The site was acquired by the National Assembly from Grosvenor Waterside Investments Limited, which was owned by Associated British Ports. The agreement covered extending the lease of Crickhowell House, later known as Tŷ Hywel, until 2023, renting the Pierhead Building for 15 years and purchasing Site 1E for £1, which would be where the Senedd building was built.

=== Design selection process ===
Before deciding on Capital Waterside as the site of the National Assembly, Davies announced on 13 March 1998 that an international competition would be held to select the design of the building for the debating chamber. Royal Institute of British Architects (RIBA) Competitions would oversee the competition and a design panel would recommend a design to the Secretary of State for Wales. The Design Competition Advisory Panel was made up of seven members and was chaired by Lord Callaghan of Cardiff, the former MP for Cardiff South and Penarth and Prime Minister of the United Kingdom. The chair and four other members were appointed by Davies and the remaining two members were appointed by the RIBA. The competition was advertised in the Official Journal of the European Communities on 13 June 1998.

Davies wanted a building "to capture the imagination of the Welsh people". The criteria of the competition were that the building should have a functional specification and a price tag of no more than £12 million including fees. In total, 55 architects had shown interest in the project: nine came from Wales, 38 from the rest of the UK and the remaining eight from the rest of the world. The Design Competition Advisory Panel selected 12 architects for interview in August 1998; from those a shortlist of six architects were chosen to submit concept designs; they were: Benson & Forsyth; Eric Parry Associates; Niels Torp and Stride Treglown Davies; Richard Rogers Partnership (now known as Rogers Stirk Harbour + Partners); Itsuko Hasegawa Atelier and Kajima Design Europe; and MacCormac Jamieson Prichard.

Steps leading to the Senedd

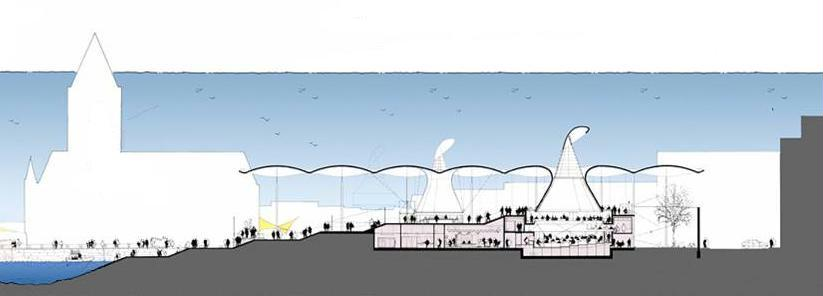
The initial concept design by Richard Rogers Partnership. Richard Rogers said the idea "was that steps (would) rise out of the water...where people...(would) look down on the Assembly Members".

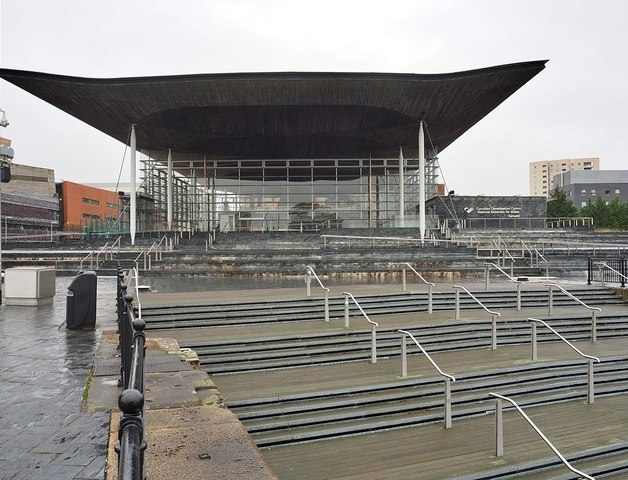
After construction, steps leading to the Senedd building (2020)

Each architect submitted designs by 5 October 1998; 10 days later the Design Competition Advisory Panel met and unanimously recommended that the Richard Rogers Partnership (RRP) design should be selected. Davies announced RRP as the scheme architects on 16 October 1998. Richard Rogers said, "The idea was that steps rise out of the water and there is a whole public domain where people meet each other and look down on the Assembly Members." Richard Rogers had previously designed the Lloyd's building in London and the Pompidou Centre in Paris with Renzo Piano. 11 days later, Davies resigned as Secretary of State for Wales.

It was planned that the outline design would be completed by June 1999, and the detailed design completed by February 2000. Construction of the building was due to begin in November 2000 and be completed in April 2001. On 1 July 1999, The National Assembly for Wales (Transfer of Functions) Order 1999 came into effect: this transferred all powers from the Secretary of State for Wales to the National Assembly for Wales; responsibility for the construction of the debating chamber transferred at the same time. Cardiff Council granted planning permission for the building on 8 November 1999, and by 26 January 2000 the National Assembly voted to progress the project to the next stage.

=== First phase of construction ===
Rhodri Morgan AM replaced Alun Michael AM as the First Secretary (now known as the First Minister) of the National Assembly on 15 February 2000. On 22 March, Morgan stopped all work on the project to carry out a complete review. The decision to stop the project was supported by a vote in the National Assembly on 6 April 2000. The review included the costs and construction risks of the new building, the timetable for the completion of the project and consideration of possible alternatives to the new building.

The review was carried out by the Assembly's Management Services Division, the Property Advisors to the Civil Estate and Symonds Group Ltd. They considered the following options: cancel the project; continue with the existing design; design a building on Site 1E; improve the existing debating chamber; construct a small chamber in the courtyard of Crickhowell House; and relocate to Cardiff City Hall. On 21 June 2000 it was agreed that the original proposal using the RRP design should proceed.

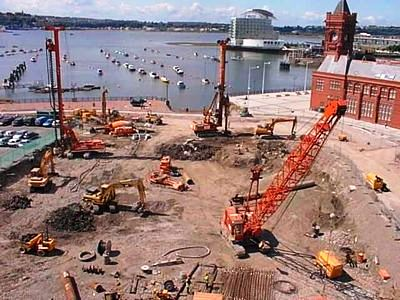
June 2001, during the first phase of construction

An international competition was held to select the main contractor. It was advertised in the Official Journal of the European Community, and in December 2000 Skanska Ltd was selected as the main contractor. Edwina Hart AM, the Minister for Finance, Local Government and Communities, approved the final project design on 18 January 2001 and by 1 March 2001, the groundbreaking ceremony took place to mark the beginning of construction.

Six months after construction had begun and with only the piling and a temporary road around the site having been completed, Hart announced on 17 July 2001 that the National Assembly had terminated the contract of RRP. She said that despite the termination of the contract, the debating chamber should still be built to RRP's design. RRP said of the project that "From the outset, RRP has advised that the project could not be built within a construction budget of £13.1M due to client changes, the political requirement to use indigenous materials at any cost and exceptional contractor changes. RRP's advice was consistently ignored. It is plainly untrue for the Finance Minister to assert that RRP underestimated the costs." Hart said she stopped the project because of the "significant underestimates in the cost plan prepared by RRP", and that RRP "had hidden costs from the Assembly".

A legal dispute then arose between RRP claiming £529,000 in fees, and the National Assembly claiming £6.85M in damages. On 10 December 2001 RRP requested an appointment of an adjudicator from the Construction Industry Council to resolve the issue. The adjudication took place in February 2002, and ruled that RRP was entitled to £448,000 of its claim, while the National Assembly was not entitled to any of the damages they had claimed.

=== Second phase of construction ===
Progress during the second phase of construction

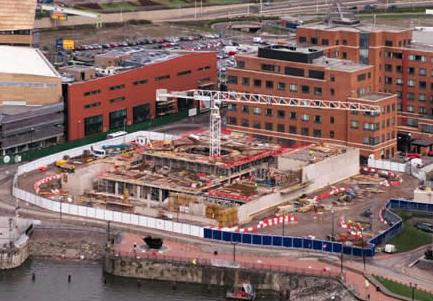
April 2004

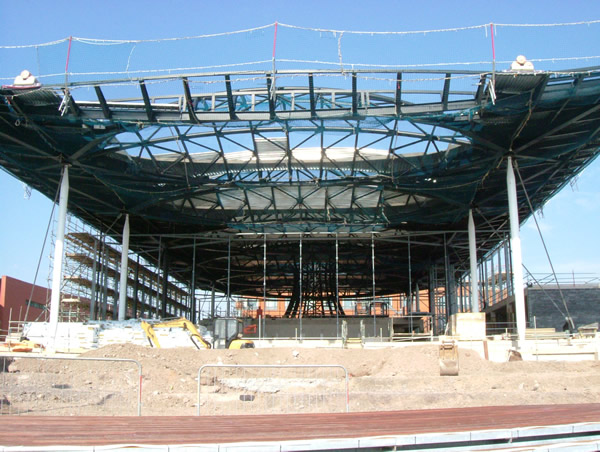
September 2004

In August 2001, the National Assembly appointed Francis Graves Ltd as the project managers, to review the whole project up until the termination of the RRP contract and to propose how the project should progress in the future. They reported that the "lines of accountability were complex and insufficiently clear", that no project costs were obtained by the National Assembly, independent of RRP, until December 2000, and that the project "was highly susceptible to cost over runs". The report recommended that the National Assembly appoint project managers, which they did when they appointed Schal International Management Ltd (part of Carillion) in May 2002. Northcroft Group Ltd were appointed as a subcontractor, responsible for cost management and they reported directly to Schal. Schal had full responsibility to manage the main contractor and subcontractors. Schal reported to a Project Board, who reported to the Minister for Finance, Local Government and Communities. The Project Board was made up of National Assembly and Welsh Government officials and a representative from Schal.

The Welsh Government decided that a design and build fixed-price contract would be used for the second phase of construction, while phase one of construction made time the important factor over cost certainty. The overall aim was to "deliver a landmark building…to time, to an appropriate quality and within budget". On 23 October 2002 an invitation to tender was issued through the Official Journal of the European Community. Eight companies submitted an interest in the tender process, including Taylor Woodrow, David McLean, Laing and Skanska, of these only David McLean and the Taylor Woodrow Strategic Alliance Partnership with RRP as a subcontractor, submitted tenders. David McLean's tender did not comply with the tender requirements, so the Assembly Government negotiated a fixed-price contract with Taylor Woodrow for £48.2M. The contract was signed between Taylor Woodrow and the First Minister on 1 July 2003 and construction began for a second time on 4 August 2003.

The cowl and funnel

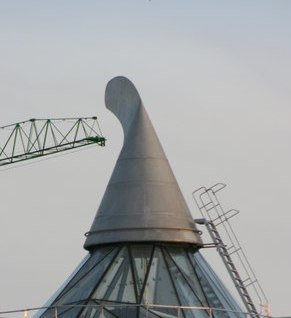
Exterior view of the cowl

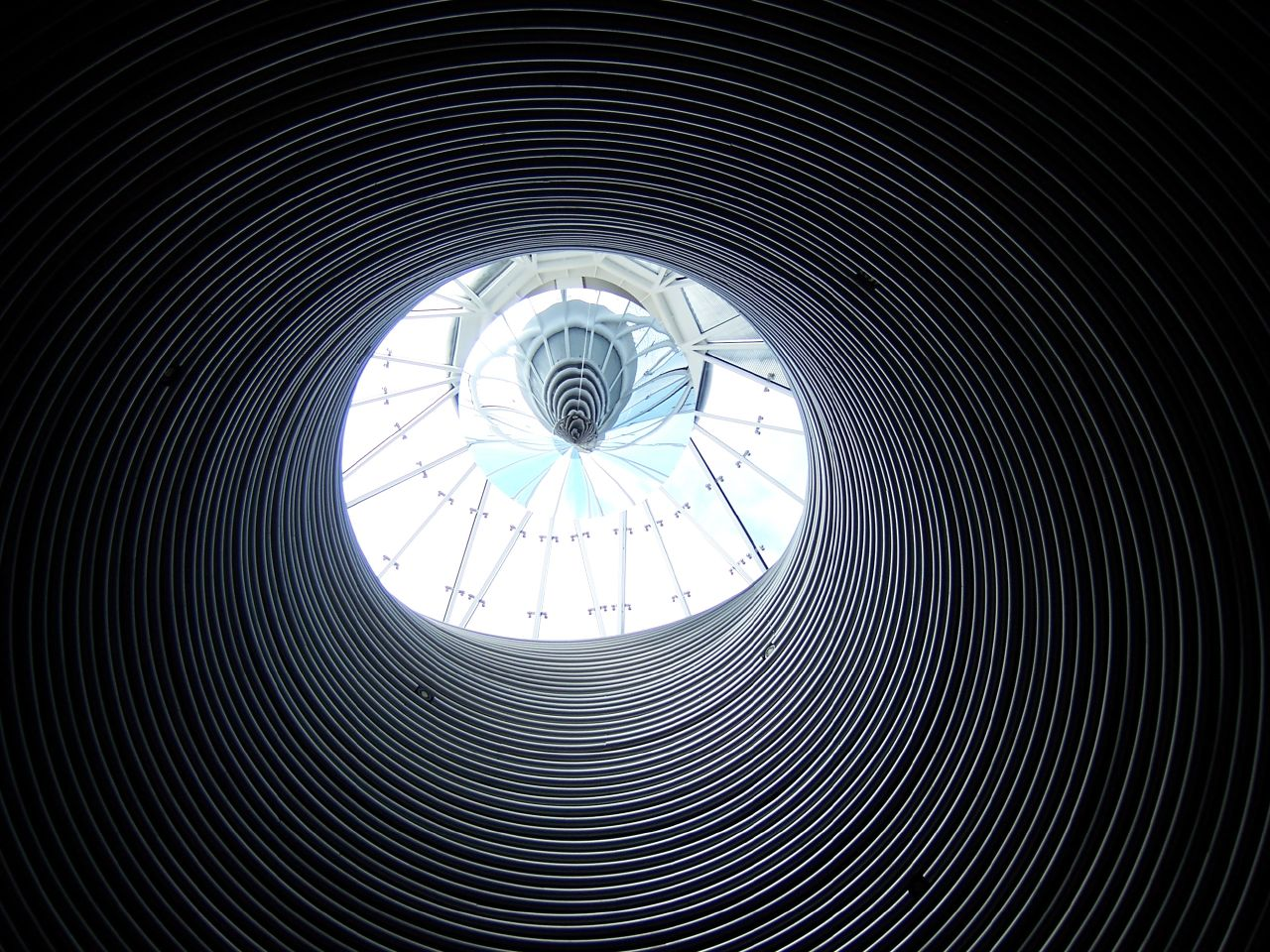
Inside the funnel and cowl viewed from the Siambr

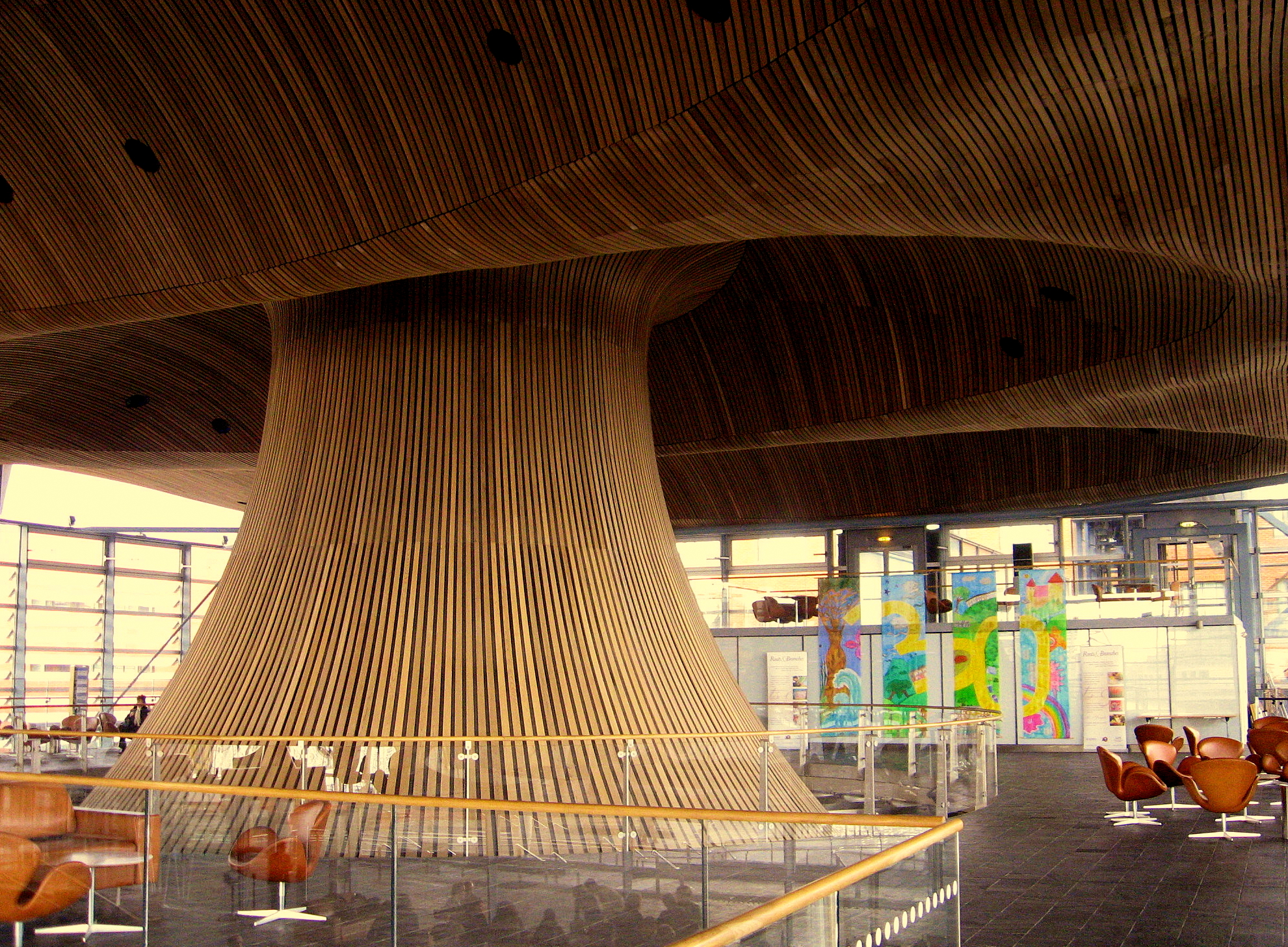
The funnel viewed from the Oriel

The topping out ceremony took place on 25 November 2004 by the Presiding Officer, Dafydd Elis-Thomas, Privy Counsellor (PC), AM, which included the lifting into place of the world's largest free rotating wind driven cowl, which was the tallest point of the building. The cowl sits 6 metres (20 ft) above the roof line and rotates when the wind changes direction to ventilate the debating chamber. Construction of the Senedd building ended on 7 February 2006 when the National Assembly took control of the building. The project was six months late, due to the National Assembly not producing a detailed specification on time. The 10-year ICT contract, known as Merlin, was between the National Assembly and Siemens Business Services Ltd, now known as Siemens IT Solutions and Services. Other subcontractors on the project included Arup (structural engineers), BDSP Partnership and MJN Colston (services engineers), and BCL Timber Projects (timber ceiling).

Official Opening of the Senedd building

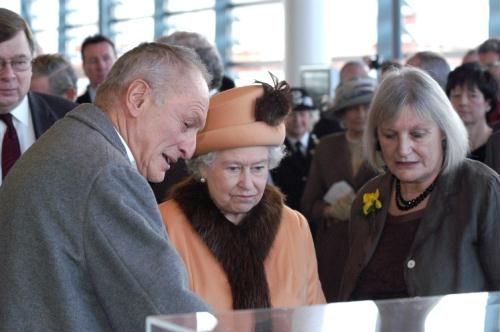
Queen Elizabeth II opening the Senedd building with Richard Rogers and Sue Essex AM

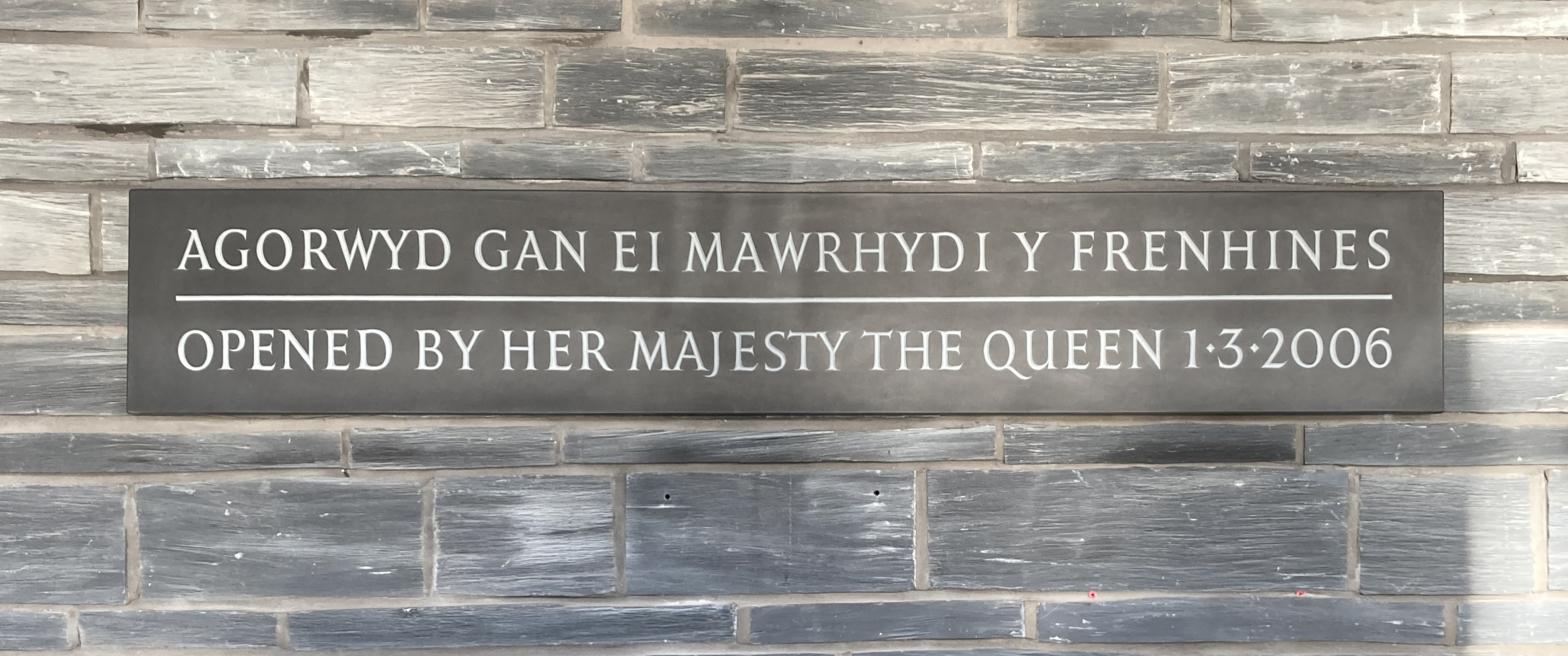
The Opening Plaque at the Senedd

The 5,308 m^{2} (57,130 sq ft) Senedd building was opened by Queen Elizabeth II, the Duke of Edinburgh, the Prince of Wales and the Duchess of Cornwall on 1 March 2006 (St. David's Day). After an address by the Queen, the Parliament of New South Wales presented a ceremonial mace to the National Assembly to recognise the links between Wales and New South Wales. Addresses were later given by John Price MP, the Deputy Speaker of the New South Wales Legislative Assembly, Morgan and Elis-Thomas. A set of commemorative envelopes and postmarks were issued by the Royal Mail to mark the opening of the Senedd building, in the form of a souvenir sheet.

Two years after the opening ceremony in 2008, Taylor Woodrow Construction were fined £200,000 and ordered to pay costs of £71,400, after being prosecuted by the Health and Safety Executive for breaching the Health and Safety at Work etc. Act 1974 at Cardiff Crown Court. The breach contributed to the death of John Walsh, a foreman working for Ferson Construction Services Ltd, a subcontractor of Taylor Woodrow. The accident occurred on 14 March 2004 and was due to a cavity wall that Mr Walsh was filling, collapsing on him, even though Taylor Woodrow Construction had recognised the risks before the contract had begun. Judge Neil Bidder QC said "No-one seriously disputes it was an unsafe construction and Ferson (Construction Services) must share blame for that construction."

=== Timeline of cost increases and time delays ===
The cost of the Senedd building increased from £12 million in 1997 to £69.6 million in 2006, an increase of 580%. In a report published in March 2008 by the Wales Audit Office, the reason for the increase was that the original estimate of £12 million was not based on any detailed design of the final requirements of the building. In addition, there were unforeseen security measures after the September 11 attacks in the United States.

After the project was stopped in 2001, the contract for the construction of the second phase of the building used a fixed-price design and build contract, which meant a much tighter control of costs than in the first phase.

Construction period	Date	Estimated and final cost (£ millions)	Estimated completion date	Notes
Phase 1 including selection processes	July 1997	c. £12 m	April 2001	The first estimate by the Welsh Office in the A Voice for Wales white paper.
Phase 1 including selection processes	16 October 1998	£11.6 m (total) £8.4 m (construction)		RRP estimated cost at time of the design selection process.
Phase 1 including selection processes	January 2000	£22.8 m		Revised estimate by RRP after changes to the design of the building by the National Assembly.
Phase 1 including selection processes	March 2000	£26.7 m	January 2003	Estimate produced by Turner and Townsend for the National Assembly.
Phase 1 including selection processes	May 2001	£37 – £47 m (total) £28 m (construction)		Estimate from a 3-day workshop by the National Assembly and all contractors involved in the project.
Phase 2	September 2001		July 2004	
Phase 2	January 2003	£29.3 m (construction)		Estimate from Taylor Woodrow, Schal and Northcroft, which was based on an incomplete design.
Phase 2	30 May 2003	£41 m (construction)	August 2005	Tender submission by the Taylor Woodrow Strategic Alliance Partnership after value engineering.
Phase 2	July 2003	£66.1 m (total) £48.2 m (construction)		The final construction lump sum offer made by the Taylor Woodrow Strategic Alliance Partnership.
Phase 2	7 February 2006	£69.6 m (final total cost) £49.7 m (final construction cost)	Completion date	The total project cost, including £7.5 m from phase 1.
1 March 2006 (Royal opening ceremony)		The project was 580% over budget compared with the original budget forecast in April 1997 (phase 1) and was four years and 10 months late. The project was 5.5% over budget from the lump sum offer made by Taylor Woodrow in July 2003 (phase 2) and was six months late due to ICT problems.		
Sources: National Audit Office Wales, Accommodation Arrangements for the National Assembly for Wales and Wales Audit Office, The Senedd

=== Repairs and reconstruction ===
In 2008, two years after the Senedd building had opened, the cost of repairs to the building had reached £97,709. Repairs have been for windows, doors, plumbing and electrics. A spokesman for the National Assembly said, "The repair figures are not excessive for a public building that has hundreds of thousands of visitors each year. The costs are within estimated levels and covered by existing budgets." In 2011, the official figures show that more than £157,000 had been spent on repairing the building since it had opened, with £29,000 having been spent on electrical repairs, £25,000 on fixing doors and almost £19,000 on plumbing. In addition, other repairs were also paid for by Vinci Construction under the terms of the contract. In was reported that rain water had leaked into a steel and glass staircase reserved for members and staff and in September 2008, a committee meeting was halted after water started dripping through the ceiling.

Following the passing of the Senedd Cymru (Members and Elections) Act 2024, more works to increase the size of the newly enlarged 96 seat chamber needed to take place in order to ensure proper space for new members. In March 2025, the siambr (debate chamber) of the Senedd was closed, with debates being temporarily moved to a smaller chamber inside the Tŷ Hywel government office building. The works include the expansion of members' offices, and an expanded siambr which will be able to properly accommodate 96 MSs. The works are expected to continue until at least March 2026, but are expected to be completed before the new 96 Senedd members sit following the 2026 Senedd election.

== Senedd estate in Cardiff Bay ==
The Senedd estate in Cardiff Bay

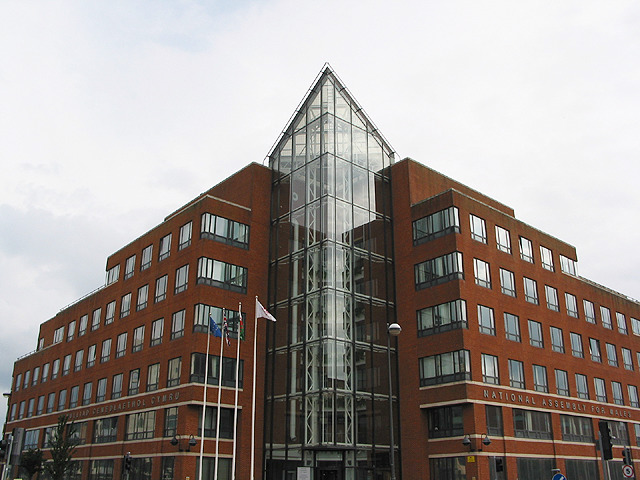
Tŷ Hywel

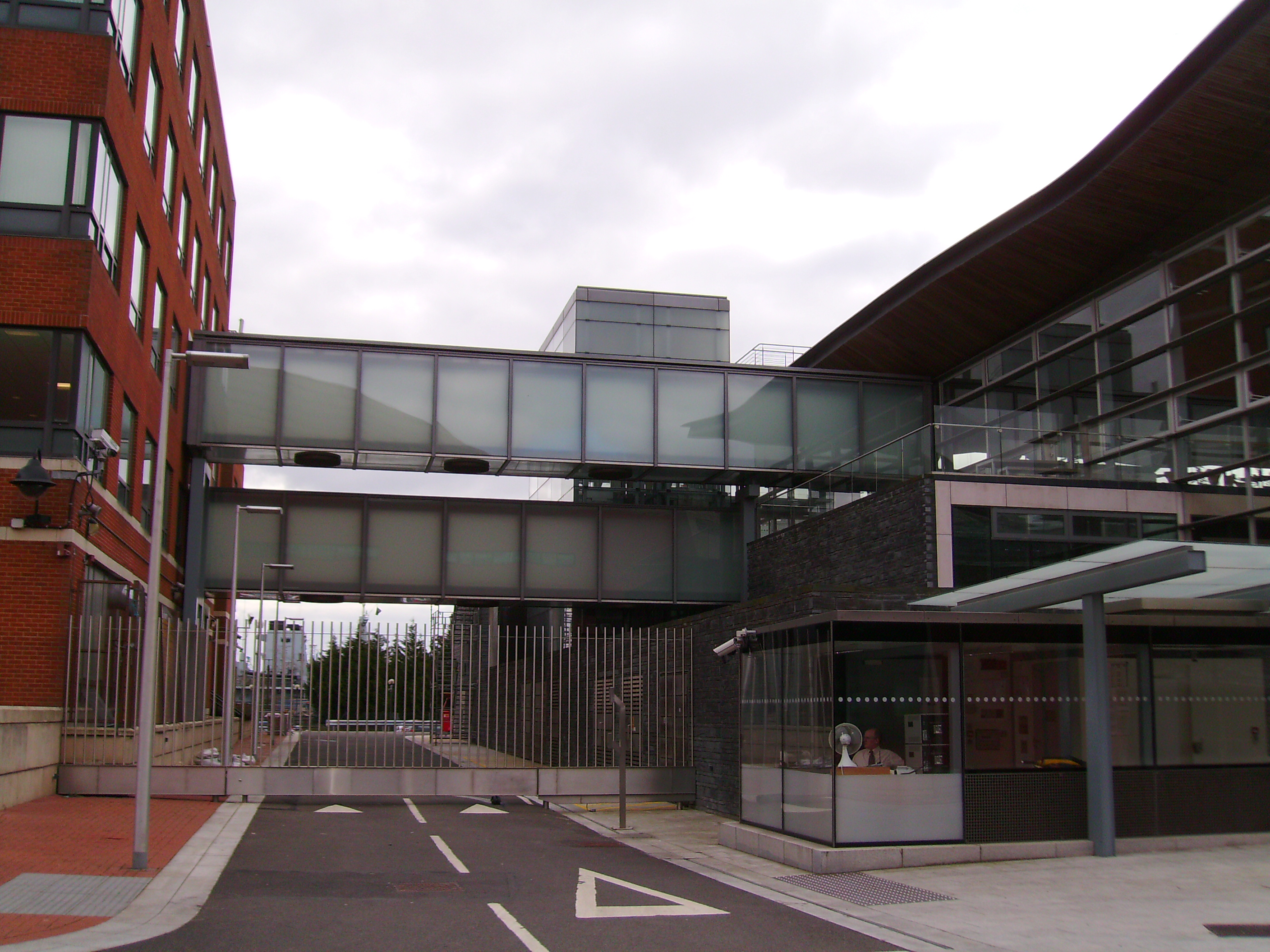
Link bridges connecting Tŷ Hywel (left) with the Senedd building (right)

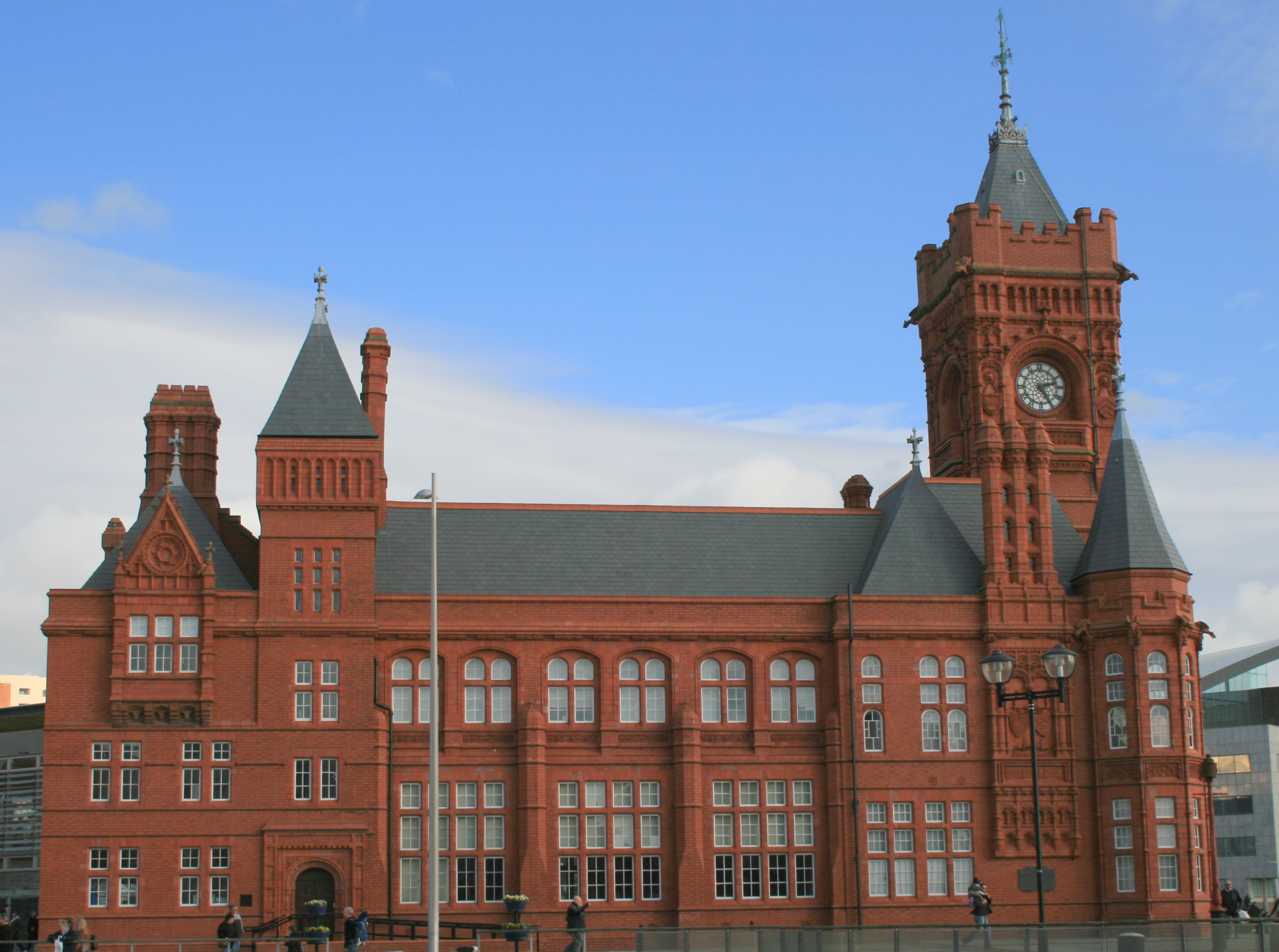
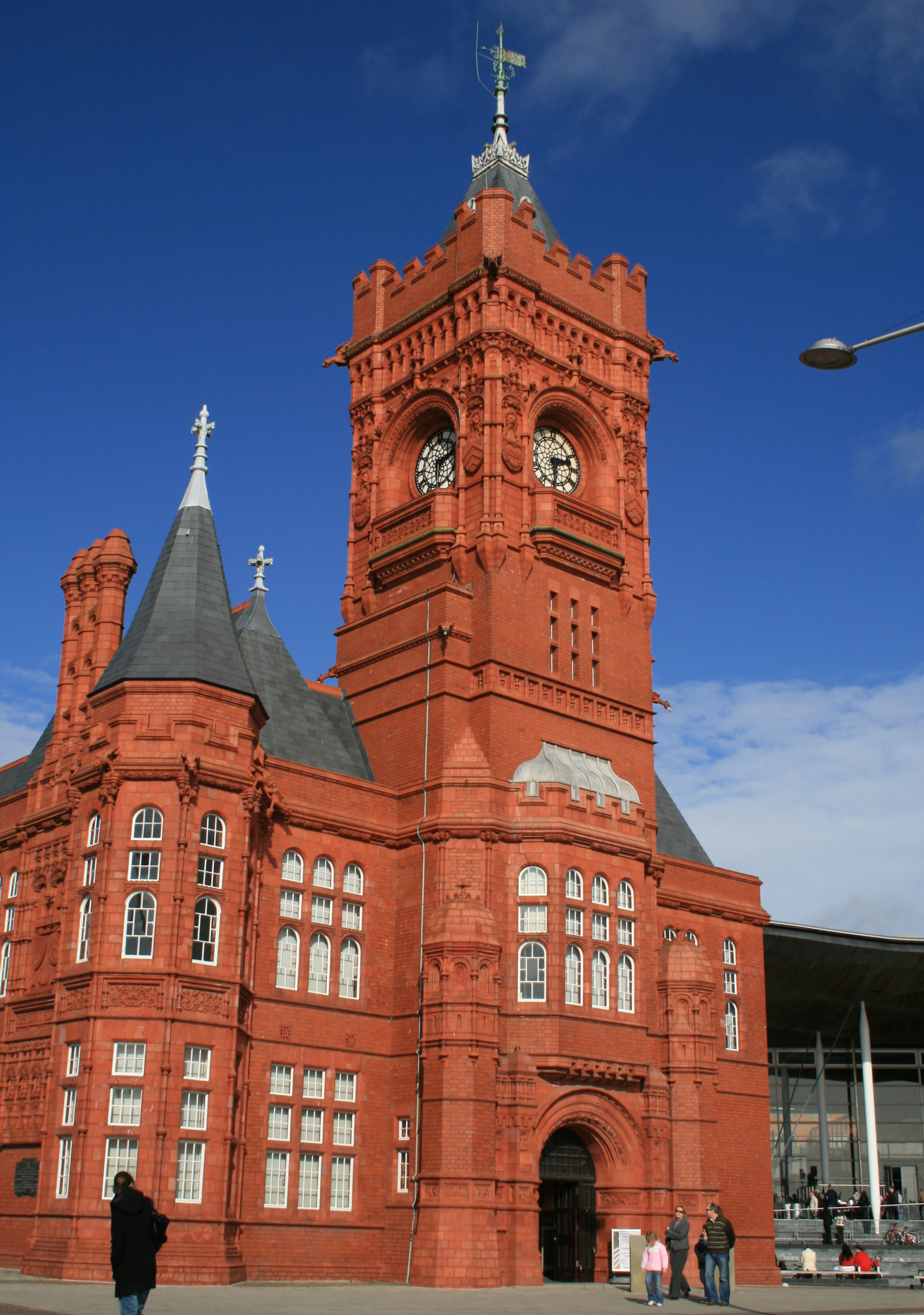
The Pierhead Building

The Senedd building is part of the Senedd estate in Cardiff Bay, along with Tŷ Hywel (Howell House) and the Grade I listed Pierhead Building. Tŷ Hywel houses staff of the Senedd Commission, MSs, the First Minister and other ministers. Tŷ Hywel is named after Hywel Dda (Howell the Good), King of Deheubarth in South West Wales. On 26 June 2008, the Prince of Wales officially opened Siambr Hywel, the then National Assembly's youth debating chamber and education centre. It is based in the debating chamber that was used by the National Assembly between 1999 and 2006, while the Senedd building was being constructed. Two covered link bridges connect the Senedd building to Tŷ Hywel. Construction of the link bridges began in September 2004 and they were completed by December 2005.

The Pierhead Building was opened in 1897 and designed by William Frame. It was originally the headquarters of the Bute Dock Company and by 1947 it was the administrative office for the Port of Cardiff. The building was reopened in May 2001 as 'The Assembly at the Pierhead', which was a visitor and education centre for the National Assembly. The exhibition provided visitors with information on the National Assembly. On 1 March 2010, the building was again reopened to the public as a Welsh history museum and exhibition. In 2008, Elis-Thomas announced that the Pierhead Building would display the history of the Black community in Butetown, Cardiff Docks, and Welsh devolution.

== In popular culture ==
The Senedd building was involved in what is called the "Sex and the Senedd" controversy. An episode of Caerdydd, the S4C Welsh language television programme set in Cardiff, which started when the broadcast of the episode shot a sex scene was filmed in a toilet room of the Senedd, and not in a television studio. The National Assembly for Wales Commission, who approved filming in the Neuadd area, the corridors of the Senedd building and for one scene in the baby-changing room, were not made aware of the nature of the scene.

The Doctor Who episode "The Lazarus Experiment" was filmed in the Senedd building, along with the ending of "The Almost People" as was the Doctor Who spin-off programme Torchwood, which used the Senedd building in the episode "Meat", where Gwen Cooper and Rhys Williams sit on the steps of the Senedd building.

In March 2015 it emerged that the makers of Spectre, the 24th James Bond film, had requested use of the Senedd building's debating chamber for the filming of some scenes, but that this had been declined by Senedd officials, who said the debating chamber was "not a drama studio". Several Welsh politicians, including First Minister Carwyn Jones and Welsh Conservatives leader Andrew RT Davies, cited the decision as a missed opportunity that would have boosted tourism for Wales.

== Nominations and awards ==
=== Building ===
- Nominated for the 2006 Stirling Prize awarded by the Royal Institute of British Architects. The award was won by Terminal 4, Barajas Airport, Madrid, also an RRP design.
- Nominated for the 2006 Prime Minister's Better Public Building Award.
- Listed as Architects' Journal's top 50 favourite buildings.
- Awarded "Excellent" certification by BREEAM, with the highest assessment score achieved at the time by a building in Wales.
- Awarded Major Project of the Year in the 2006 Building Services Awards, organised by Building Sustainable Design and Electrical and Mechanical Contractor magazines.
- Awarded the 2006 Gold Medal winner from the National Eisteddfod of Wales.
- Awarded the Slate Award in the 2006 Natural Stone Awards.
- Awarded the British Constructional Steelwork Association's 2006 Structural Steel Design Award.
- Awarded the 2006 Excellence on the Waterfront from the Waterfront Center, in the category Commercial and Mixed Use.
- Civic Trust Award winner in 2008.
- Awarded a Chicago Athenaeum 2007 International Architecture Awards.

=== Individual award ===
- Jeremy Williams (of Taylor Woodrow Construction) won the Construction Manager of the Year Award in 2006 for his work on the Senedd building by the Society of Professional Engineers. He also won a gold medal in the New Build/Refurbishment Projects Over £25 million category.

== See also ==
- Politics of Wales
- Senedd on television
- Owain Glyndŵr's Parliament House (Senedd-dy Owain Glyndŵr)
- Parliament Buildings (Northern Ireland)
- Scottish Parliament Building
- Palace of Westminster
- City Hall, London
