= List of public art in Cardiff =

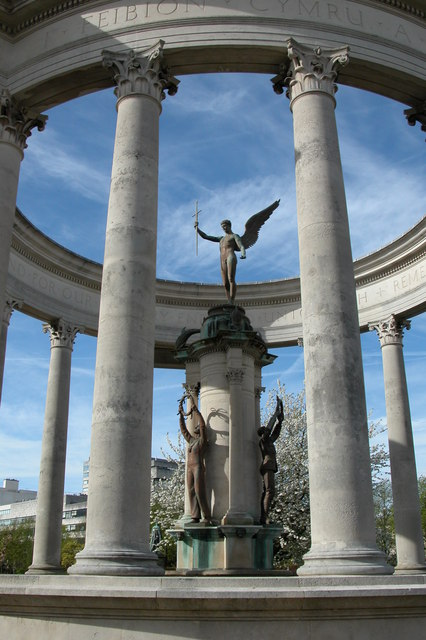
The Welsh National War Memorial (Sir Ninian Comper, 1924–8) in Cathays Park, showing sculptures by Bertram Pegram

This is a list of public art in Cardiff, Wales, within the city and county boundary, including statues, sculptures, murals and other significant artworks located outside in public view.

== Adamsdown ==
Image	Title / individual commemorated	Type	Location	Date	Sculptor	Architect / Designer	Source
	Crucifixion with Mary and John	Sculpture	St German's Church, Star Street	1965	Frank Roper	—N/a	

== Bute Park ==
Image	Title / subject	Location and coordinates	Date	Artist / designer	Type	Material	Dimensions	Designation	Owner / administrator	Notes
More images	Animal Wall	Bute Park	1887–8; 1930–1	Thomas Nicholls and Alexander Carrick (Architect: William Burges)	Sculptures			Grade I		
	Awen	Outside the Royal Welsh College of Music and Drama	1975	Charles l'Anson	Sculpture					
	Fox and Owl	Bute Park	2004	Nansi Hemming	Tree carving					

== Canton ==
Image	Title / individual commemorated	Type	Location	Date	Sculptor	Architect / Designer	Notes	Source
	Joyance	Sculpture	Thompson's Park	1899	William Goscombe John	—N/a		
	Billy The Seal	Sculpture	Victoria Park	1997	David Petersen	—N/a	Commissioned by CBAT the Arts & Regeneration Agency on behalf of Cardiff Council.	

== Cardiff Bay and Butetown ==
Image	Title / subject	Location and coordinates	Date	Artist / designer	Architect / other	Type	Designation	Notes
More images	3 Ellipses for 3 Locks	Cardiff Bay Barrage	2007	Felice Varini	—N/a			The first work by Varini in the UK, this sculpture was a year in planning and cost £25,000. Commissioned on behalf of the Harbour Authority by CBAT the Arts & Regeneration Agency.
	A Meeting Place on the Plinth	Senedd	2006	Richard Harris	—N/a			Harris created the 45-tonne sculpture from 39 slate slabs. The slate was from Cwt y Bugail Quarry in north Wales.
	Animal Wall	Century Wharf	2009	—N/a	Gitta Gschwendtner			Commissioned by CBAT the Arts & Regeneration Agency on behalf of the developer of the site.
More images	Antarctic 100 Captain Scott Memorial	Waterfront Park	2003	Jonathon Williams	—N/a	Mosaic sculpture		
	Beastie Benches	Britannia Quay and Waterfront Park	1994	Gwen Heeney	—N/a	Sculptures		The nine brick sculptures are based on creatures mentioned in Dylan Thomas's "Ballad of the Long-Legged Bait". The bricks were made by Dennis of Ruabon, the same firm which a century earlier had produced the exterior terracotta decoration of the Pierhead Building. Commissioned by Cardiff Bay Arts Trust on behalf of Grosvenor Waterside.
More images	Cader Idris	Cardiff Bay Wetlands Reserve	1999	William Pye	—N/a	Sculpture		Previously located in Central Square outside Cardiff Central Station. Pye drew his inspiration for the work from the mountains, lakes and valleys of Wales and in particular Cader Idris in Snowdonia.
More images	Cardiff Bay Rugby Codebreakers	Landsea Gardens	2023	Steve Winterburn	—N/a	Sculptural group		The statue depicts rugby league players Gus Risman, Billy Boston and Clive Sullivan.
	Cargoes	Bute Street and Stuart Street	2000	Brian Fell	—N/a	Architectural sculptures		
More images	Celtic Ring	Roald Dahl Plass	1993	Harvey Hood	—N/a	Sculpture		Commissioned by Cardiff Bay Arts Trust on behalf of Cardiff Bay Development Corporation.
	Equity	Portland House, West Bute Street	c. 1926–1927	J. A. Stevenson	F. C. R. Palmer and W. F. C. Holden	Architectural sculpture		
	Statue of Mahatma Gandhi	The Flourish	2017	Ram V. Sutar and Anil Sutar	—N/a	Sculpture		6 ft (1.83 m) bronze statue near the Wales Millennium Centre at the end of Lloyd George Avenue cost £65,000 and was funded by the Hindu Council of Wales.
More images	From Pit to Port	Roath Basin	2005	John Clinch and John Buck	—N/a	Sculpture		
	Landsea Square Water Feature		2000		Jo Johnson Landscape Architects	Sculpture		
	Lighthouse (Blue Beacon)	Cardiff Bay Police Station	2009	Mark Renn	—N/a	Sculpture		60 feet tall steel sculpture of a lighthouse (with blue flashing light) commissioned by Safle on behalf of South Wales Police at a cost of £75,000.
More images	Looking Both Ways	Lloyd George Avenue	2001	David Kemp	—N/a	Sculpture		The silhouette sculpture is approximately 10 feet tall by 10 feet wide. It is made from painted mild sheet steel, with pink on one side and blue on the other.
More images	Merchant Seafarers' War Memorial	Near the Senedd	1994–1996	Brian Fell	—N/a	Sculpture		Commissioned by Cardiff Bay Arts Trust on behalf of the Merchants Seafarers Association, funded through various private donations supplemented by Cardiff Bay Development Corporation.
	Statue of Rhodri Morgan	Outside the Pierhead Building	2026	Andy Edwards	—N/a	Statue		
More images	Statue of Ivor Novello	Roald Dahl Plass	2009	Peter Nicholas	—N/a	Statue		
More images	Pobl Fel Ni / People Like Us	Boardwalk	1993	John Clinch	—N/a	Statues		
	Portrait Bench	Pont y Werin	2010	—N/a	—N/a	Statues		Two-dimensional figures of Sybil Williams, founder of the Cardiff-based cycling charity Pedal Power, Jason Stone, an ice hockey player for Cardiff Devils and Lydia Harris, a 10-year-old pupil of Mount Stuart Primary School, laser cut in Corten steel. Three people from the Vale of Glamorgan are commemorated on the Penarth side of the bridge.
	Sails	Cardiff Bay Retail Park	1996	Richard Thornton	—N/a	Sculpture		
	Ship in a Bottle	Cardiff Bay wetlands	2004	Melissa Gibbs	—N/a	Sculpture		Commissioned by CBAT the Arts & Regeneration Agency on behalf of the Cardiff Bay Development Corporation.
More images	Water Tower	Roald Dahl Plass	2000	William Pye	—N/a	Sculpture/Fountain		
More images	Wife on the Ocean Wave	Graving Docks	1993	Graham Ibbeson	—N/a	Sculpture		
	Lampstandards	Along the waterfront at Roath Basin, Britannia Park and Britannia Quay	1994	Tess Jaray, Tom Lomax	—N/a	Sculpture		Commissioned by Cardiff Bay Arts Trust on behalf of Grosvenor Waterside.
More images	Yellow Bench	Longueil Close	1999	Andrew Rowe	—N/a	Sculpture		Commissioned by CBAT the Arts & Regeneration Agency on behalf of the developer of the Premier Inn Hotel. This work has recently been relocated to the opposite corner of the Premier Inn, to make way for an extension of the hotel. The work is dedicated to the brother of the original commissioner, who had died in a car accident.
	Balcony Grills	Amity Court	2001	Andrew Rowe	—N/a	Sculpture		Commissioned by CBAT the Arts & Regeneration Agency on behalf of the developer of the site.
	Tree in the Bay	Cardiff Bay Trail	2005	Angharad Pearce Jones (with children from Ysgol Gymraeg Melin Gruffydd)	—N/a	Sculpture		Commissioned by Cardiff Bay Arts Trust on behalf of Grosvenor Waterside.
More images	Assembly Field	Left-hand the side of the Senedd main entrance	2005	Danny Lane	—N/a	Sculpture and wind break		
More images	World Harmony Peace Statue Statue of Sri Chinmoy	Waterfront Park	2012	Kaivalya Torpy	—N/a	Statue		Unveiled 11 March 2012 to mark the 25th anniversary of the World Harmony Run.
	Funnel and Smoke	Hemingway Road	2004	Andrew Hazell	—N/a	Sculpture		
	Palisade	Waterfront Park	1991	Denys Short	—N/a	Sculpture		Commissioned by Cardiff Bay Arts Trust on behalf of Grosvenor Waterside.
	Triple Spout	Roald Dahl Plass	2000	William Pye	—N/a	Sculpture		
	Water Quarter	Galleon Way	2006	Howard Bowcott	—N/a	Sculpture		Commissioned by CBAT the Arts & Regeneration Agency on behalf of the developer of the site.
	West Close Square	West Close Square	1993	Nina Edge and David Makie	—N/a	Sculpture		Commissioned by Cardiff Bay Arts Trust on behalf of Cardiff Bay Development Corporation.
	Angelina Street	Angelina Street	2004	Ray Smith	—N/a	Sculpture		Commissioned by CBAT the Arts & Regeneration Agency on behalf of Cardiff Council.
	Atlantic	Tyndall Street	1991	Doug Cocker	—N/a	Sculpture		Commissioned by CBAT the Arts & Regeneration Agency on behalf of the developer of the site.
	Atlantic Echo	Ocean Way	2000	Dan Archer	—N/a	Sculpture		Commissioned by CBAT the Arts & Regeneration Agency on behalf of the developer of the site.
	Monorail	Railway Embankment	1995	Sokari Douglas Camp	—N/a	Sculpture		Commissioned by CBAT the Arts & Regeneration Agency on behalf of the developer of the site.
	Bute Street Works	Bute Street	2000	Parnell, Mackie and Rowe		Bespoke bollards and paving inserts		Commissioned by CBAT the Arts & Regeneration Agency on behalf of the Cardiff Bay Development Corporation.
	Deep Navigation	Roald Dahl Plass	2000	Stephan Gec		Sculpture		Consists of two cast iron pillars, modelled on those from a nearby bank building. The first pillar is cast from metal retrieved from the former Oval Basin and includes the names of all of the South Wales coal mines that were operational in 1964. The second pillar is cast from metal retrieved from Tower Colliery and identifies all of the ports to which Cardiff exported coal. Commissioned by CBAT the Arts & Regeneration Agency on behalf of the Cardiff Bay Development Corporation.
	The Big Egg	Henke Court, Schooner Way	2000	Rachel Joynt		Sculpture		Commissioned by CBAT the Arts & Regeneration Agency on behalf of the developer of the site.

== Cathays ==
Image	Title / individual commemorated	Type	Location	Date	Sculptor	Architect / Designer	Source
	Saint Michael triumphant over the Devil	Architectural sculpture	St Michael and All Angels church, Whitchurch Road	c. 1995	Theo Grunwald	—N/a	

== Cathays Park ==
Image	Title / individual commemorated	Type	Location	Date	Sculptor	Architect / Designer	Notes
	Henry Bruce, 1st Baron Aberdare	Statue	Alexandra Gardens	1895–1898	Herbert Hampton	—N/a	
	Gorsedd circle	Stone circle	Gorsedd Gardens	1899	—N/a	—N/a	Previously erected elsewhere in the park for the 1899 National Eisteddfod; relocated here in 1905.
	Science and Education	Architectural sculpture	Cardiff Crown Court	1901–1904	Donald McGill	Lanchester, Stewart and Rickards	
	Commerce and Industry	Architectural sculpture	Cardiff Crown Court	1901–1904	Paul Raphael Montford	Lanchester, Stewart and Rickards	
	Poetry and Music	Architectural sculpture	Cardiff City Hall	1901–1904	Paul Raphael Montford	Lanchester, Stewart and Rickards	
	Unity and Patriotism	Architectural sculpture	Cardiff City Hall	1901–1904	Henry Poole	Lanchester, Stewart and Rickards	
	The Sea Receiving the Severn	Architectural sculpture	Cardiff City Hall	1901–1904	Paul Raphael Montford	Lanchester, Stewart and Rickards	
	The Taff, the Rhymney and the Ely	Architectural sculpture	Cardiff City Hall	1901–1904	Henry Poole	Lanchester, Stewart and Rickards	
	George V	Statue in niche	Cardiff University Main Building, Museum Avenue elevation	c. 1903	?	W. D. Caröe	
	Edward VIII as Prince of Wales	Statue in niche	Cardiff University Main Building, Museum Avenue elevation	c. 1903	?	W. D. Caröe	
	Welsh Dragon	Architectural sculpture	Cardiff City Hall (roof)	1904	Henry Charles Fehr	Lanchester, Stewart and Rickards	
	John Cory	Statue	Gorsedd Gardens	1904–1906	Sir William Goscombe John	—N/a	
	South African War Memorial	Memorial	King Edward VII Avenue	1905–1909	Albert Toft	—N/a	
	Gwilym Williams	Statue	Outside Cardiff Crown Court	1906–1910	Sir William Goscombe John	—N/a	
	Mining	Sculptural group	Glamorgan Building	1908–1912	Albert Hodge	—N/a	
	Navigation	Sculptural group	Glamorgan Building	1908–1912	Albert Hodge	—N/a	
	Godfrey Morgan, 1st Viscount Tredegar	Equestrian statue	City Hall lawn	1909	Sir William Goscombe John	—N/a	
	Mining	Architectural sculpture	National Museum Cardiff	1914–1915	Thomas J. Clapperton	Smith and Brewer	
	Shipping	Architectural sculpture	National Museum Cardiff	1914–1915	Thomas J. Clapperton	Smith and Brewer	
	Prehistoric Period	Architectural sculpture	National Museum Cardiff	1914–1915	Gilbert Bayes	Smith and Brewer	
	Classic Period	Architectural sculpture	National Museum Cardiff	1914–1915	Gilbert Bayes	Smith and Brewer	
	Medieval Period	Architectural sculpture	National Museum Cardiff	1914–1915	Richard Garbe	Smith and Brewer	
	Modern Period	Architectural sculpture	National Museum Cardiff	1914–1915	Richard Garbe	Smith and Brewer	
	Learning	Architectural sculpture	National Museum Cardiff	1914–1915	Thomas J. Clapperton	Smith and Brewer	
	Art	Architectural sculpture	National Museum Cardiff	1914–1915	Bertram Pegram	Smith and Brewer	
	Music	Architectural sculpture	National Museum Cardiff	1914–1915	David Evans	Smith and Brewer	
	Dragons and Lions	Architectural sculpture	National Museum Cardiff	1914–1915	Bertram Pegram	Smith and Brewer	
	Lord Ninian Crichton-Stuart	Statue	Gorsedd Gardens	1915–1919	Sir William Goscombe John	—N/a	
	Welsh National War Memorial	Memorial	Alexandra Gardens	1924–1928	Bertram Pegram	Sir Ninian Comper	
	John Crichton-Stuart, 3rd Marquess of Bute	Statue	Friary Gardens	1930	James Pittendrigh Macgillivray	—N/a	
		Relief sculpture	Redwood Building	1960–1961	Edward Bainbridge Copnall	Percy Thomas and Son	
	David Lloyd George	Statue	Gorsedd Gardens	1955–1960	Michael Rizzello	—N/a	
	Agriculture	Architectural sculpture	National Museum Cardiff	1962–1965		T. Alwyn Lloyd and Gordon	
	Slate Quarrying	Architectural sculpture	National Museum Cardiff	1962–1965		T. Alwyn Lloyd and Gordon	
	Three Obliques (Walk In)	Sculpture	Outside Cardiff University School of Music	1968	Dame Barbara Hepworth	Sir Alex Gordon	
	Falklands War Memorial (Cardiff)	Commemorative stone	Alexandra Gardens	1982			
	Red Dragon	Sculpture	Bute Building	1984	David Petersen	Ivor Jones and Percy Thomas	
	Reguarding Guardians of Art	Architectural sculpture	National Museum Cardiff	1988–1990	Dhruva Mistry	—N/a	
	Memorial to Welsh Volunteers in the Spanish Civil War	Commemorative stone	Alexandra Gardens	1992			
	Girl	Sculpture	Gorsedd Gardens	2005	Robert Thomas	—N/a	
	Mind's Eye	Ceramic relief sculpture	Tower Lecture Theatre, Cardiff University, Park Place	2006–2007	Peter Randall-Page	—N/a	
	The Gift of Life Stone	Commemorative stone	Alexandra Gardens	2007			
	Welsh National Falklands War Memorial	Commemorative stone	Alexandra Gardens	2007			
	Thalidomide Memorial	Commemorative stone	Alexandra Gardens	2016			
	Parasitoid Attacking An Aphid Mark Jervis	Sculpture	Sir Martin Evans Building (faculty of Biosciences), Cardiff University	2016	Darren Greenhow		
	Memorial to Black and Ethnic Minority Service Personnel	Commemorative stone	Alexandra Gardens	2019			

== City centre ==
The area is bounded by the River Taff to the west, the Civic centre to the north and railway lines and two railway stations – Central and Queen Street – to the south and east respectively.

Image	Title / individual commemorated	Type	Location	Date	Sculptor	Architect / Designer	Notes	Source
	Alight	Sculpture	Mary Anne Street, outside Tŷ Admiral	2014	S. Mark Gubb	—N/a	Unveiled 17 December 2014. A 10-metre-tall, illuminated steel and glass lightning bolt.	
	Allegories of the drapery business	Relief sculpture	Howells department store	1930	—	Percy Thomas		
	All Hands	Sculpture	Custom House Street	2001	Brian Fell	—N/a	Sculpture runs on the path of the Glamorganshire Canal depicting canal workers pulling boats with ropes. Commissioned by CBAT the Arts & Regeneration Agency on behalf of Cardiff Bay Development Corporation.	
	Alliance	Sculpture	Hayes Place	2009	Jean-Bernard Métais	—N/a	Includes glowing liquid, projected light and text (written by Peter Finch). Commissioned by CBAT the Arts & Regeneration Agency on behalf of Land Securities.	
	An Eye for People	Mosaic	Thomson House, Havelock Street	1959	Ray Howard-Jones	—N/a	In 1958 Howard-Jones won a national competition held by the Western Mail for a mosaic outside their new headquarters. The mosaic (and building) was destroyed in 2008.	
	Aneurin Bevan	Statue	Queen Street	1987	Robert Thomas	—N/a		
	Betty Campbell	Bust with sculpture group	Central Square	2021	Eve Shepherd	—N/a		
	Boots, 36 to 38 Queen Street	Painting	Queen Street			Stephen Bonutto	Original design is mosaic which would be behind the painting.	
	Cardiff Central Station Mosaics	Mosaic	Cardiff Central railway station	2003	Rob Turner	—N/a		
	Chess Sets	Street furniture	The Hayes	2009	Bedwyr Williams	—N/a	Commissioned by CBAT the Arts & Regeneration Agency on behalf of Land Securities.	
	Connect 4 or 5	Light sculpture	Wood Street Railway Bridge	2009	Adrian Stuart	DO-Architecture Ltd	Illuminated LED installations beneath the arches of the bridge.	
	Christ and the Samaritan Woman at the Well	Drinking fountain	Dock Feeder	1862	W. and T. Wills	—N/a	Donated by William Alexander, Mayor of Cardiff from 1859 to 1860.	
	Jim Driscoll	Statue	Bute Terrace	1997	Philip Blacker	—N/a	Commissioned by CBAT the Arts & Regeneration Agency on behalf of Cardiff Bay Development Corporation.	
	Family Group	Sculptural group	Queen Street	2009	Robert Thomas	—N/a		
	Giant Daffodils	Mural	Cardiff Central Water Tower	1984	Dennis Bridge (team leader)	—N/a	Work was carried out in June 2012 to repaint the tower in beige and brown.	
	Grecian Woman	Statue in niche	The Prince of Wales public House (formerly a theatre), St Mary Street	c. 1920	—N/a	—N/a	Installed when the building was a theatre	
	John Batchelor	Statue	The Hayes	1883–6	James Milo Griffith	—N/a	The statue of this Liberal politician John Batchelor roused opposition from his opponents when it was first erected. The council was presented with a petition for its removal and, in 1887, the statue was daubed with coal tar and paint.	
	John Crichton-Stuart, 2nd Marquess of Bute	Statue	Callaghan Square	1848–53	John Evan Thomas	—N/a	Originally located in front of the old Town Hall in St Mary Street and moved to Callaghan Square in 2000.	
	Miner	Statue	Queen Street	2005	Robert Thomas	—N/a		
	Mother and Son	Sculptural group	Queen Street	2005	Robert Thomas	—N/a		
	Nereid	Sculpture	Kingsway	1995–6	David Nathan	—N/a		
	Pierhead Clock	Clock	St Mary Street	2011	Marianne Forrest	—N/a	The clock mechanism, dating to 1897, was formerly used by the clock of the Pierhead Building. It was replaced in 1973 and sold to an American collector, who decided to return it to Cardiff in 2005. The monkeys on swinging on the pendulums are a reference to the 3rd Marquess of Bute's opposition to Darwin's theory of evolution.	
	Sir Tasker Watkins	Statue	Outside the Millennium Stadium	2009	Roger Andrews	—N/a		
	Untitled	Sculpture	Formerly on The Hayes (now removed)	1972	Garth Evans	—N/a	40-metre long black steel sculpture commissioned by the Peter Stuyvesant Foundation in 1972 and exhibited for 6 months. Returned to The Hayes in September 2019 for another 6 months.	
	Without Place	Sculpture	Junction of Charles Street and Queen Street	2011	Denis O'Connor and Bernie Rutter	—N/a		

== Grangetown ==
Image	Title / individual commemorated	Type	Location	Date	Sculptor	Architect / Designer	Notes	Source
	Fountain Canopy - Grange Gardens’	Sculpture	Grange Gardens Park	1909	MacFarlanes of Glasgow	—N/a		
	A Private View	Stainless steel sphere	A4232 link road	1995	Kevin Atherton	—N/a	Commissioned by CBAT the Arts & Regeneration Agency on behalf of South Glamorgan County Council.	
	Grange Gardens War Memorial	Memorial with statue	Grange Gardens	1920	Henry Charles Fehr	—N/a		
	International Mother Language Monument	Sculpture	Grangemoor Park	2019	—N/a	—N/a		
	Sevenoaks Park Graffiti Wall	130m mural	Sevenoaks Park	2007	–	Various	Mural first created in July 2007 as part of the Roxe Jam festival and renewed each year thereafter by local and international graffiti artists.	
	Silent Links	Sculpture	Grangemoor Park	2000	Ian Randall	—N/a	Commissioned by CBAT the Arts & Regeneration Agency on behalf of Cardiff Bay Development Corporation.	
	The Marl Railings	Sculpture	The Marl			—N/a		
	Urban Open Spaces’	Sculpture	Grangemoor Park	1999	Jeremy Waygood	—N/a	Commissioned by CBAT the Arts & Regeneration Agency on behalf of Cardiff Bay Development Corporation.	

== Heath ==
Image	Title / individual commemorated	Type	Location	Date	Sculptor	Architect / Designer	Source
	War Memorial	Memorial	Maindy Barracks	1924	—N/a	Sir Edwin Lutyens	

== Leckwith ==
Image	Title / individual commemorated	Type	Location	Date	Sculptor	Architect / Designer	Source
	Fred Keenor	Statue	Cardiff City Stadium	2012	Roger Andrews	—N/a	

== Llandaff ==
Image	Title / individual commemorated	Type	Location	Date	Sculptor	Architect / Designer	Source
	The City Cross	Cross	The Cathedral Green	13th century; restored 1897	—N/a	—N/a	
	War memorial	Memorial	The Cathedral Green	1924	Sir William Goscombe John	J. P. Grant	
	James Rice Buckley	Statue	The Cathedral Green	1924–6	Sir William Goscombe John	—N/a	
	Map of Llandaff’	Sculpture	High Street	1981	Jeremy Waygood	—N/a	

== Radyr ==
Image	Title / individual commemorated	Type	Location	Date	Sculptor	Architect / Designer	Source
	Radyr War Memorial	Memorial with statue	Heol Isaf / Kings Road	—N/a	Alfred Turner	—N/a	

== Riverside ==
Image	Title / individual commemorated	Type	Location	Date	Sculptor	Architect / Designer	Source
	Seeds and Spices	Four sculptures	Fitzhamon Embankment	2007	David Mackie, Heather Parnell, Andrew Rowe	—N/a	

== Roath ==
Image	Title / subject	Location and coordinates	Date	Artist / designer	Architect / other	Type	Designation	Notes
	Christ the Pantocrator of Roath	St Martin's Church	2013	Aidan Hart	Paul Mitchell (stonemason for frame)	Mosaic	—N/a	The mosaic was blessed by Rowan Williams, the former Archbishop of Canterbury and of Wales. It was based on mosaics in Hagia Sophia, Istanbul (the Deësis) and the Sancta Sanctorum chapel of St John Lateran, Rome.

== Splott ==
Image	Title / individual commemorated	Type	Location	Date	Sculptor	Architect / Designer	Notes	Source
	Blue Flash, Power Box and Mesh Chips	Sculpture	Electricity sub-station, Tyndall Street	1994	John Gingell	—N/a	Commissioned by Cardiff Bay Arts Trust on behalf of SWALEC.	
	Landmark	Sculptures	Roundabout, Tyndall Street/Ocean Way	1992	Pierre Vivant	—N/a	Also known locally as the Magic Roundabout. Commissioned by Cardiff Bay Arts Trust on behalf of Cardiff Bay Development Corporation.	

== Tremorfa ==
Image	Title / subject	Location and coordinates	Date	Artist / designer	Architect / other	Type	Designation	Notes
	Secret Station	Rover Way, Ffordd Pengam (off the A4232 road)	1992	Eilis O'Connell	—N/a	Sculpture	—N/a	This was originally commissioned by Cardiff Bay Arts Trust on behalf of the Cardiff Bay Development Corporation. In 2019 several external bronze panels were stripped and stolen, leaving the work severely vandalised. As of May 2022 the work has not been repaired and is in a very poor state.

== Whitchurch ==
Image	Title / individual commemorated	Type	Location	Date	Sculptor	Architect / Designer	Source
	Whitchurch War Memorial	Memorial with statue	Outside Whitchurch Library	1920	—N/a	—N/a	

== Bibliography ==
- Newman, John (1995). Glamorgan. The Buildings of Wales. London: Penguin.
