= Ann Compton (art historian) =

Art historian born 1956

Ann Compton is an art historian and an Affiliate in the History of Art, School of Culture & Creative Arts at the University of Glasgow. She has worked on a major project, 'Mapping the Practice and Profession of Sculpture in Britain and Ireland, 1851-1951', as Originator, Director and Editor. She is a Research Consultant on this project and is a member of the Sculpture Steering Panel at Art UK. She is a widely published author of and contributor to publications in her field. She is a member of the Advisory Board of the journal 'Public Monuments and Sculpture Association' (PMSA).

== Education ==
Ann Compton attended the Courtauld Institute of Art for postgraduate study and was awarded Master of Arts.

== Personal life ==
Ann Compton was born in 1956 and is the second daughter of Michael Graeme Compton, OBE, (1927-2013) and Susan Paschal Compton, née Benn, (b.1930). Michael Graeme Compton was the Keeper of Museum Services at the Tate Gallery, where he made important contributions to the curating of contemporary art. Susan Pascal Compton studied art history at the Courtauld Institute of Art and was awarded a PhD for her thesis 'Kazimir Malevich: A Study of his Painting, 1912-1916'.

== Academic life ==
Given the working background and interest in art history of her parents it is not surprising that Ann Compton became an art historian. She has specialised in sculpture in which she has made major contributions to research and teaching. She is a leading figure in 'Mapping the Practice and Profession of Sculpture in Britain and Ireland 1851-1951'. This is a partnership of universities and art museums with aims of furthering research in the subject during the period.

Ann Compton has had involvement with the 'Sculptural Processes Group' set up in 2007 at the Courtauld Institute of Art and has contributed to its annual seminar 'Tools and Tooling' on Victorian Architectural Sculpture. Her paper ‘"An essentially different kind of rhythm": Rediscovering Henry Moore’s Sculpture in Wood', written in 2015, made an important contribution to Moore's oeuvre, in particular with its focus on the medium he used for some of his most important works.

Another link to the Courtauld Institute of Art is a collection of photographs attributed to Ann Compton and held in the photographic collection of the Conway Library. This large collection consists mainly of secular and religious architectural and sculptural images.

== Other published works ==
- The Sculpture of Charles Sargeant Jagger, British sculptors and sculpture series
- Garth Evans Sculpture: Beneath the Skin
- Painting in a Coloured Light: An Exhibition of Stained Glass and Related Works
- Edward Halliday Art for Life 1925-39
- Edward Carter Preston 1885-1965: Sculptor, Painter, Medallist
- Garth Evans: Sculpture from the Sixties
- The Chapter 'Building a better class of craft practitioner: ideals and realities in sculptural practice and the building industry c.1880-1910' in Art Versus Industry? New Perspectives on Visual and Industrial Cultures in Nineteenth Century.
- A chapter in Sculpting Art History: Essays in Memory of Benedict Read
