= Roald Dahl Plass =

Public plaza in Cardiff Bay in Cardiff, Wales

Coordinates: 51°27′50.14″N 3°9′51.11″W

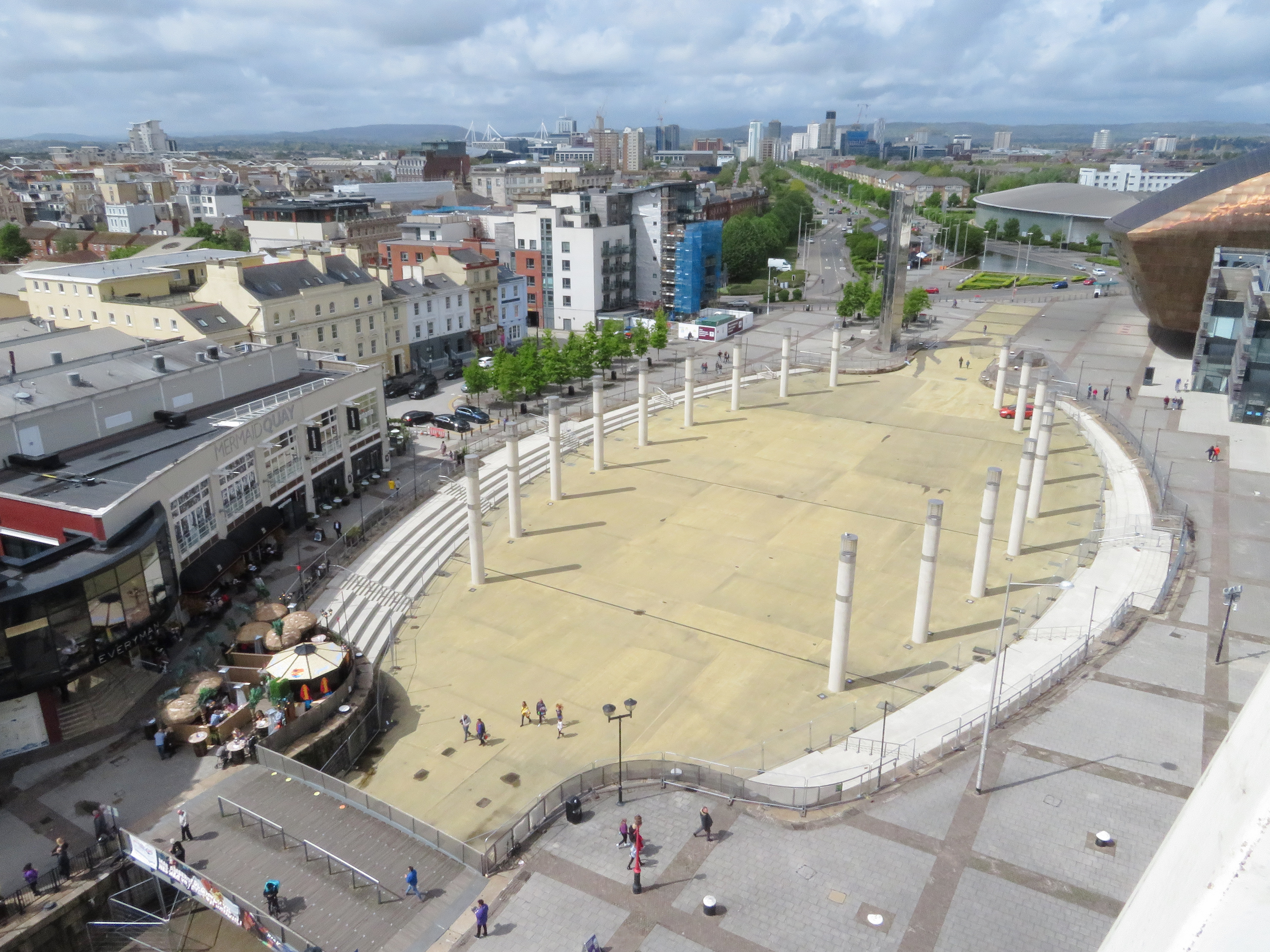
Roald Dahl Plass. The Mermaid Quay shopping complex is to the left.

Roald Dahl Plass is a public space in Cardiff Bay, Cardiff, Wales. It is named after Cardiff-born author Roald Dahl, and is located on the coast along the south of the city centre. The square is home to the Senedd building housing the Senedd, the Welsh parliament, and the Wales Millennium Centre, a performing arts centre. The bowl-like shape of the space has made it a popular amphitheatre for hosting open-air concerts.

Formerly named the Oval Basin and known as the Bowl, the area was one of the docks for a thriving coal port during the latter half the 19th century and much of the 20th century. Following World War II, the space entered a period of decay and dereliction until the 1980s, when the Cardiff Bay area was regenerated.

The name acknowledges the writer's roots (both of Dahl's parents were from Norway) and the Norwegian seafarers' church which stands nearby. "Plass" is the Norwegian cognate of the English word "place"; in this context the word means square.

== History ==
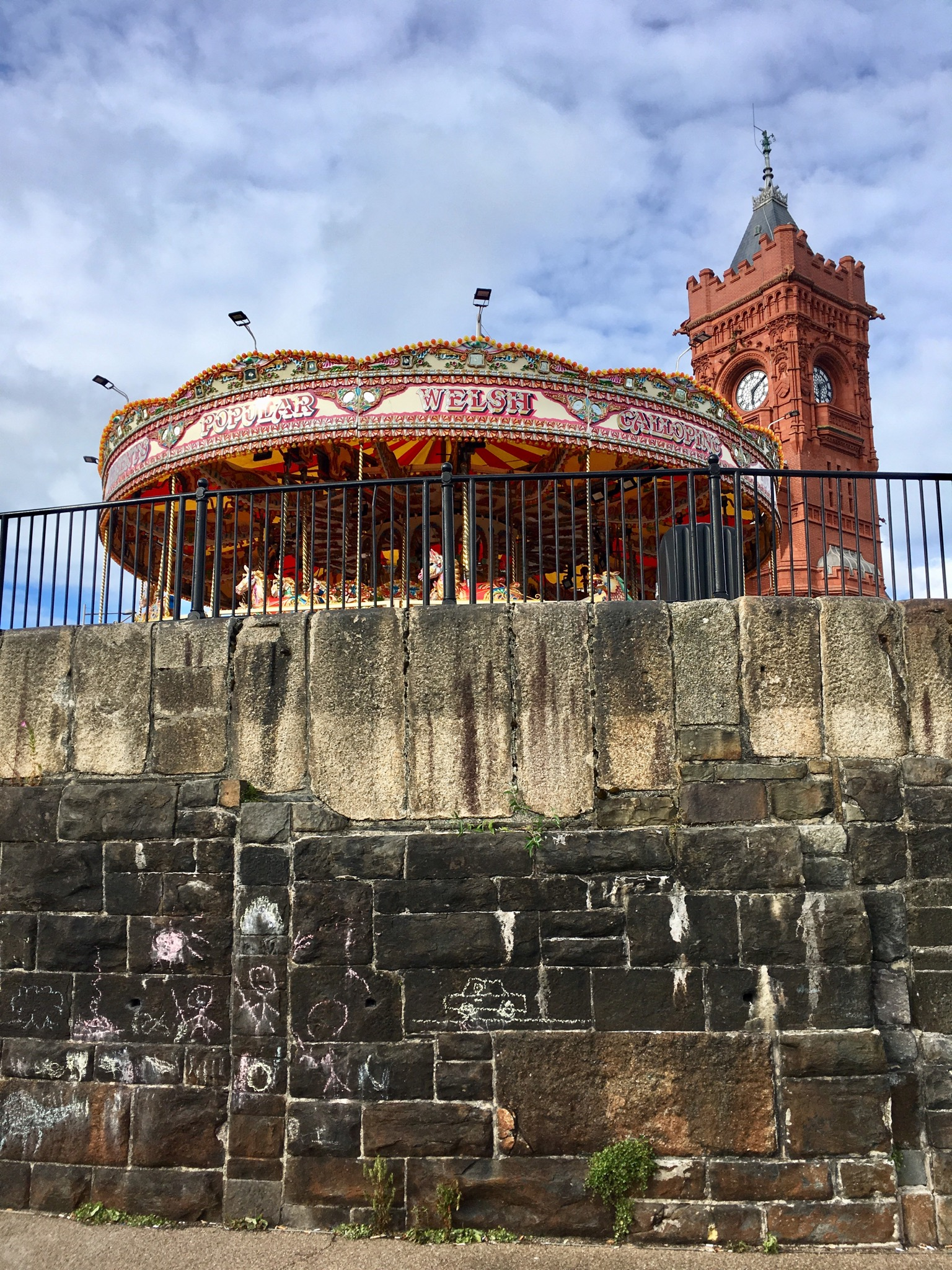
The sea walls of Bute Dock basin in July 2020

The area originally comprised wetlands owned by John Crichton-Stuart, 2nd Marquess of Bute. He was persuaded to finance construction of the dock on his land at a cost of over £ 350,000. The dock opened under the name "West Bute Dock" on 8 October 1839, and was over 1400 yards (1280 m) long and 200 feet (60 m) wide, allowing 300 vessels to berth at any time.

The dock was joined by four others: East Bute Dock, Roath Basin, Roath Dock and Queen Alexandra Dock. Cardiff became the largest exporter of coal in the world; in 1913, the city exported 10,700,000 tonnes of coal. However, the Great Depression, Second World War and cheap foreign competition all caused great damage to the Welsh coal mining industry, with the last coal export through the dock taking place in 1964. The dock was filled in to prevent collapse of the surrounding walls.

== Design features ==
=== Oval Basin ===
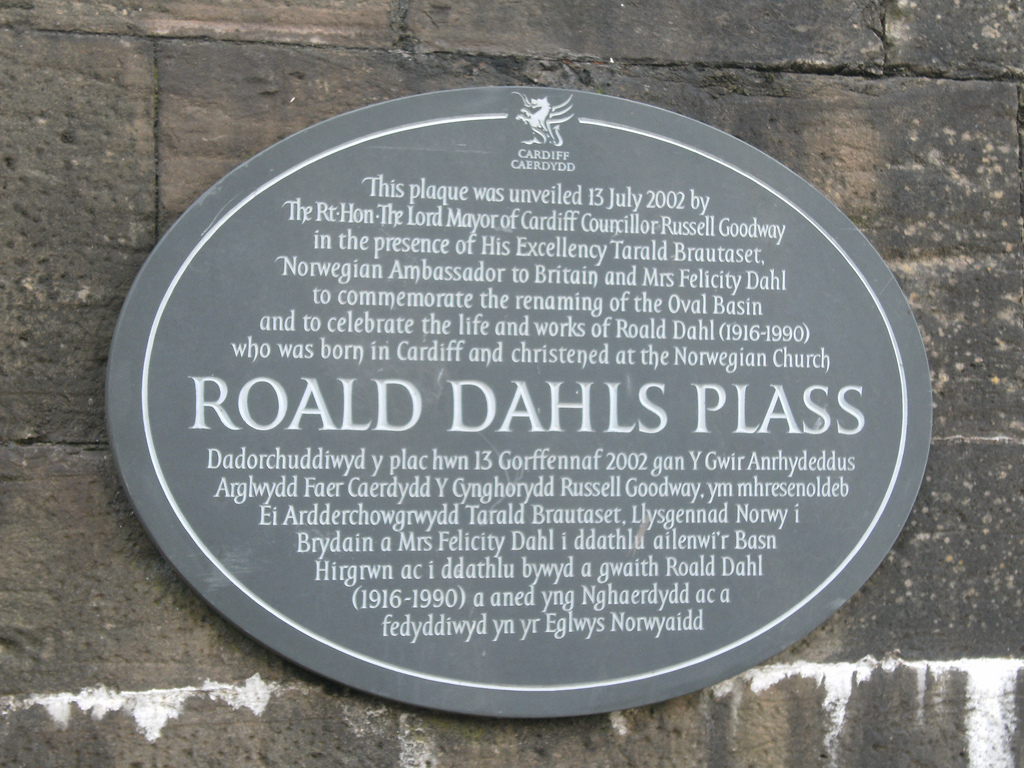
Plaque to commemorate Roald Dahl (incorrectly displays Roald Dahls Plass, instead of Roald Dahl Plass)

The Oval Basin was designed by the artist William Pye in conjunction with Nicholas Hare Architects, and opened in April 2000. A plaque was unveiled on 13 July 2002 to commemorate its renaming to Roald Dahl Plass.

Roald Dahl Plass is today an oval-shaped open space surrounded by illuminated pillars and gravel covering over the original dock area. The Plass was a central part of Cardiff's bid for European Capital of Culture status for 2008, although it ultimately lost the bid to Liverpool.

=== Water Tower ===
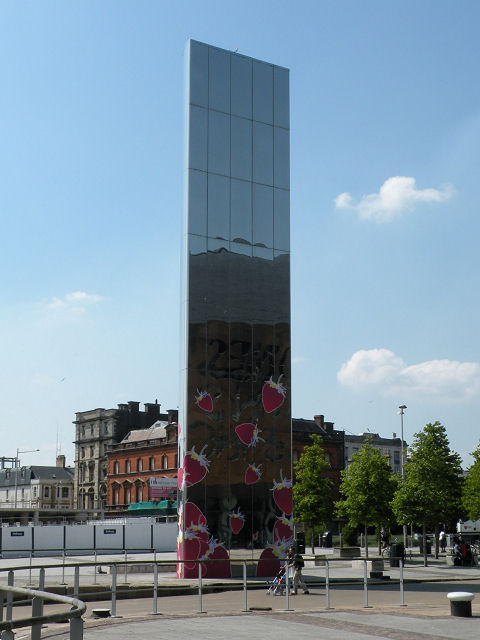
The Water Tower

At the north end of the plass is the Water Tower, which is approximately 70 feet (21 m) high with an intermittent stream of water running down the metallic fountain. The tower was also designed by Nicholas Hare Architects in conjunction with the sculptor, William Pye.

== Doctor Who and Torchwood ==
Roald Dahl Plass, especially the Water Tower, has featured prominently in the BBC television drama Doctor Who and its spin-off, Torchwood. Roald Dahl Plass' first appearance is in the episode "Boom Town". In the show's universe, a "spatial-temporal" rift runs through Cardiff, a feature that the Ninth Doctor uses as a fueling station for his TARDIS.

In Torchwood, the fictional Torchwood Institute has one of its headquarters, Torchwood Three, based under the square, to monitor alien activity through the rift. The base of the fountain can be seen passing through the building, and one of the paving tiles in the square is a decoy which hides an "invisible lift" leading down to the base. This base was effectively destroyed in Torchwood: Children of Earth but Roald Dahl Plass was seen briefly at the end of the first episode of Miracle Day.

Due to the Water Tower's prominence in the series, it is sometimes referred to as the "Torchwood Tower", with postcards having been published using that name.

== Festivals and events ==
Roald Dahl Plass is often used to host concerts and other cultural events, such as the Cardiff Food Festival. In August 2018 it was central to the 'no fence' National Eisteddfod, with stalls and an open-air music stage. The Gorsedd Ceremony took place in the square on the Monday and the Friday.

Views of Roald Dahl Plass
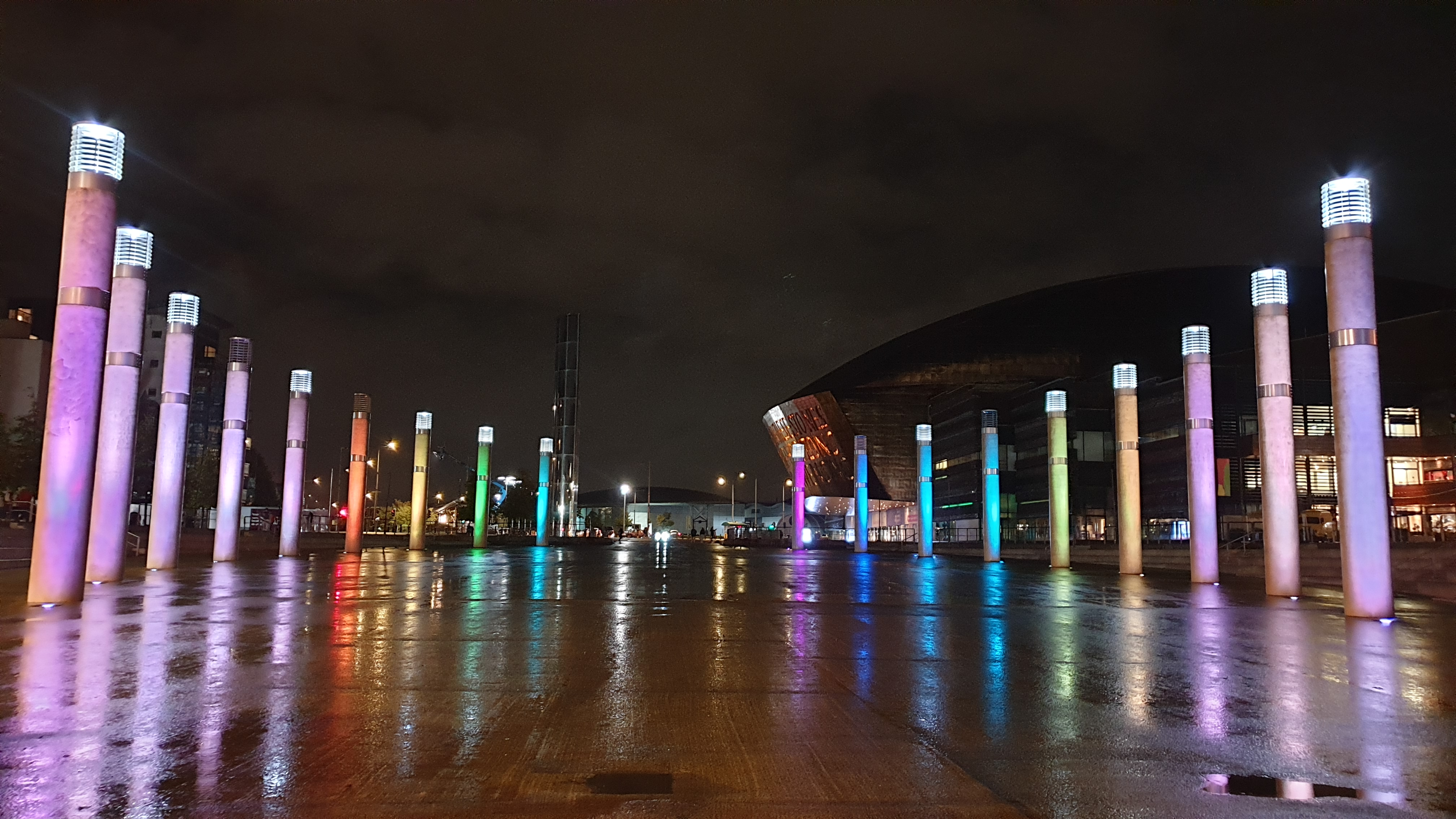
Roald Dahl Plass illuminated at night

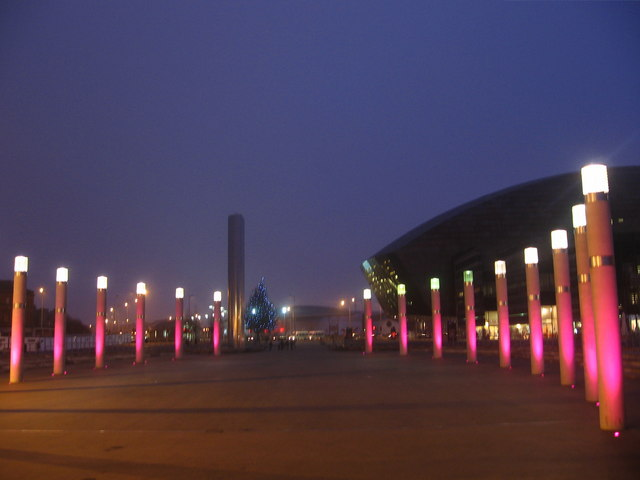
Roald Dahl Plass at night, Christmas 2008

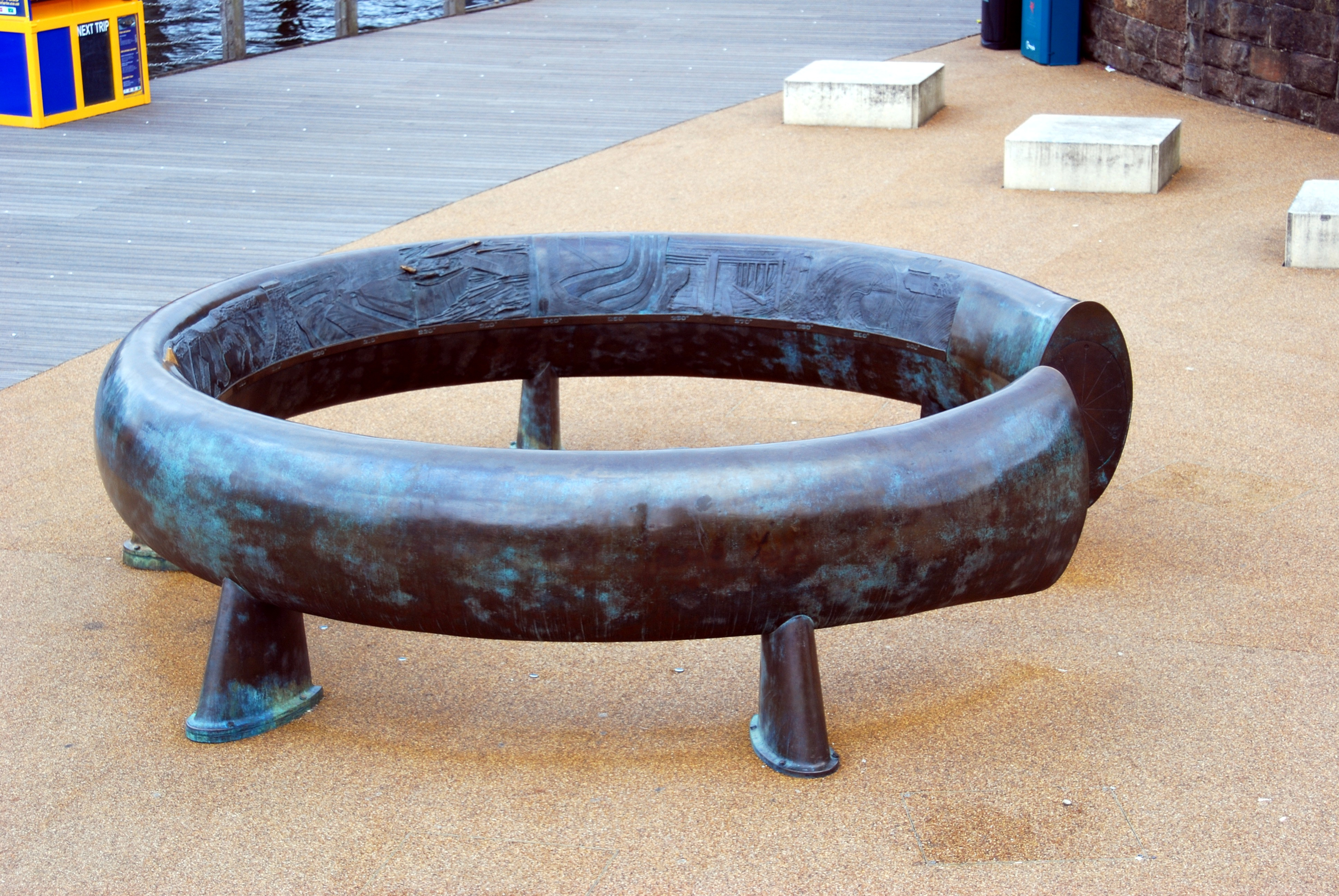
Celtic Ring sculpture

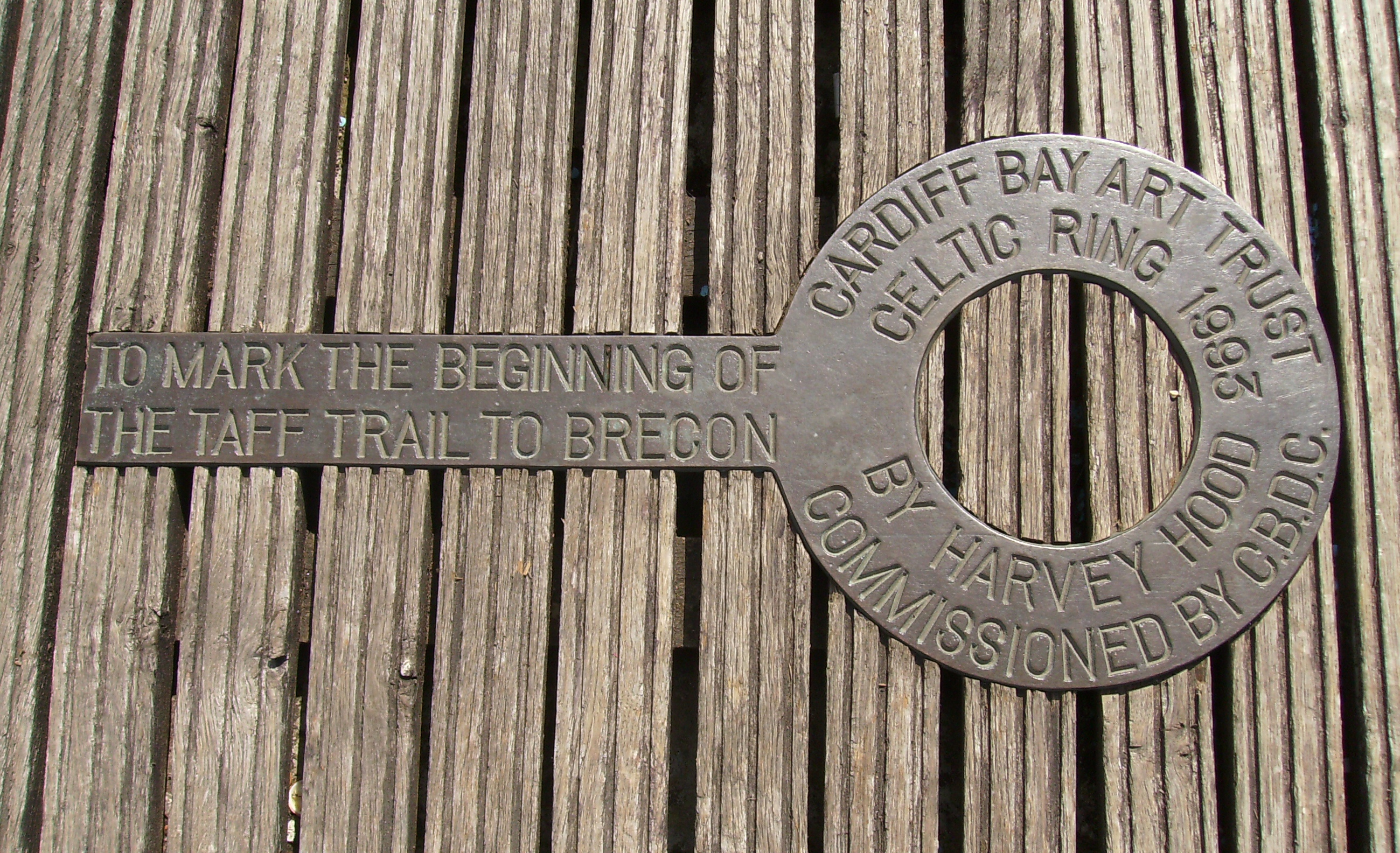
Plaque indicating the start of Taff Trail, commissioned by the Cardiff Bay Development Corporation

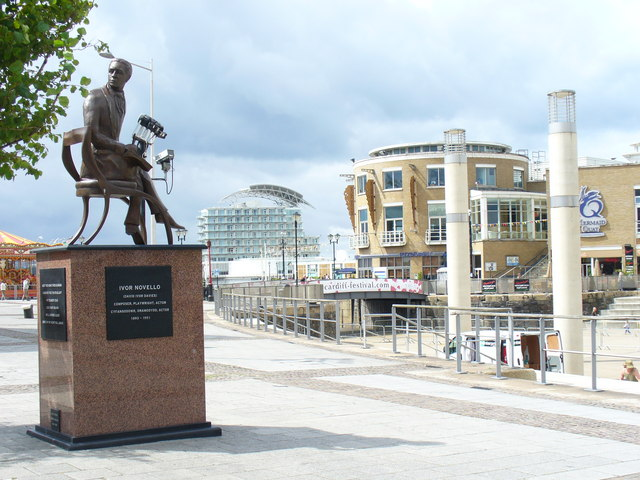
Statue of Ivor Novello

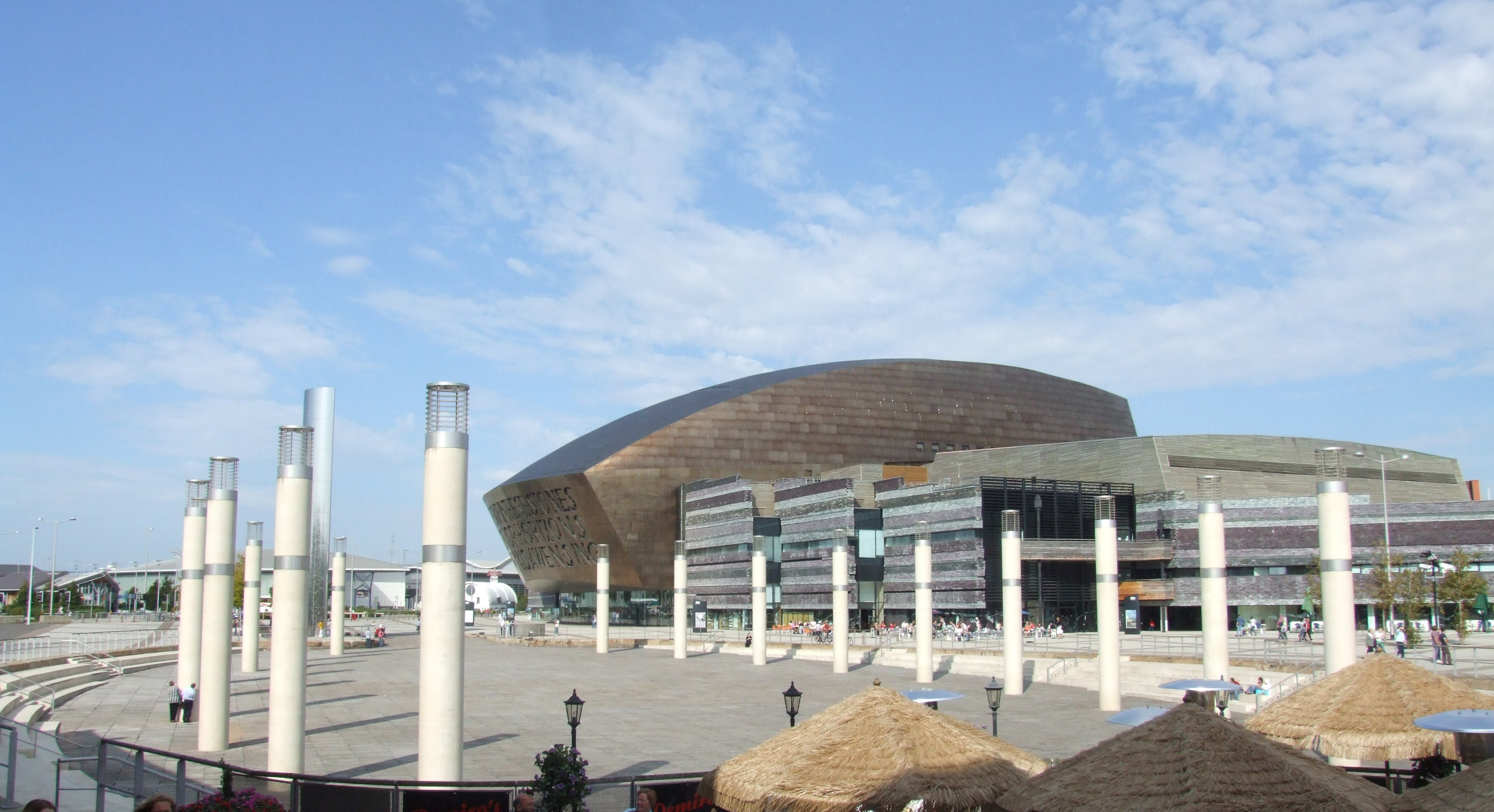
Roald Dahl Plass next to the Wales Millennium Centre

== See also ==
- List of public art in Cardiff
