= Statue of Aneurin Bevan =

Statue in Cardiff, Wales

Coordinates: 51.48161°N 3.17868°W

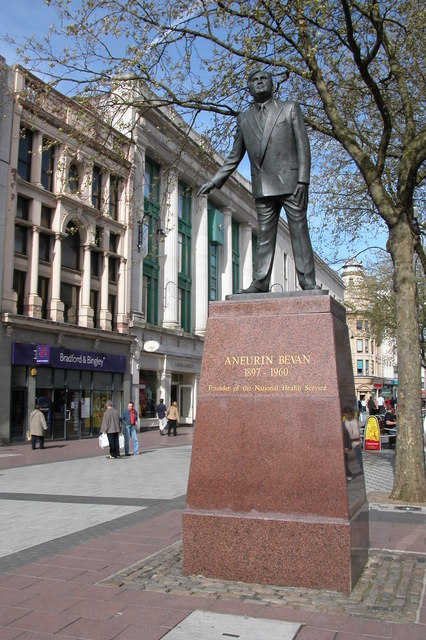
Nye Bevan statue, Queen Street, Cardiff

A statue of Aneurin Bevan stands at the western end of Queen Street, Cardiff, Wales in recognition of Aneurin Bevan (1897 – 1960) who is credited with founding the National Health Service (NHS). It has been described as "perhaps one of Wales' most iconic statues".

The statue was erected in 1987, designed by Robert Thomas.

== Background ==
Bevan became Labour MP for Ebbw Vale in 1929, subsequently an effective public speaker known for his left wing views and being temporarily expelled from the party on two occasions (one of them for his opposition to nuclear weapons). He was elected to the Labour's National Executive and became Minister for Health in the post-war Labour government, where he was behind the nationalisation of healthcare and founding of the NHS. As Minister for Housing he took steps to solve the post-war housing shortage. Bevan remained MP for Tredegar until his death in 1960.

== Statue ==
The statue was commissioned by South Glamorgan County Council and designed by Welsh sculptor, Robert Thomas, who also created a number of other sculptures in Cardiff city centre. The statue was erected in 1987 at the far end of Queen Street. It is the only statue of Bevan (as of 2021) in the United Kingdom.

The figure of Bevan, wearing a suit and leaning forward in a typical pose, is cast in bronze and stands on top of a polished granite pedestal. The statue is 1.83 metres (6.0 ft) in height, while the pedestal is 2.14 metres (7.0 ft) high. In gold on the front of the pedestal are the words "Founder of the National Health Service".

In 2018, as the 70th anniversary of the founding of the NHS approached, plastic spikes were added to Bevan's head to deter the regular visits of seagulls, who had frequently covered Bevan's head with their guano.

The statue is often used as the focus, or starting point, of events, demonstrations and protests.
