= Untitled (Evans) =

Sculpture in Cardiff, Wales

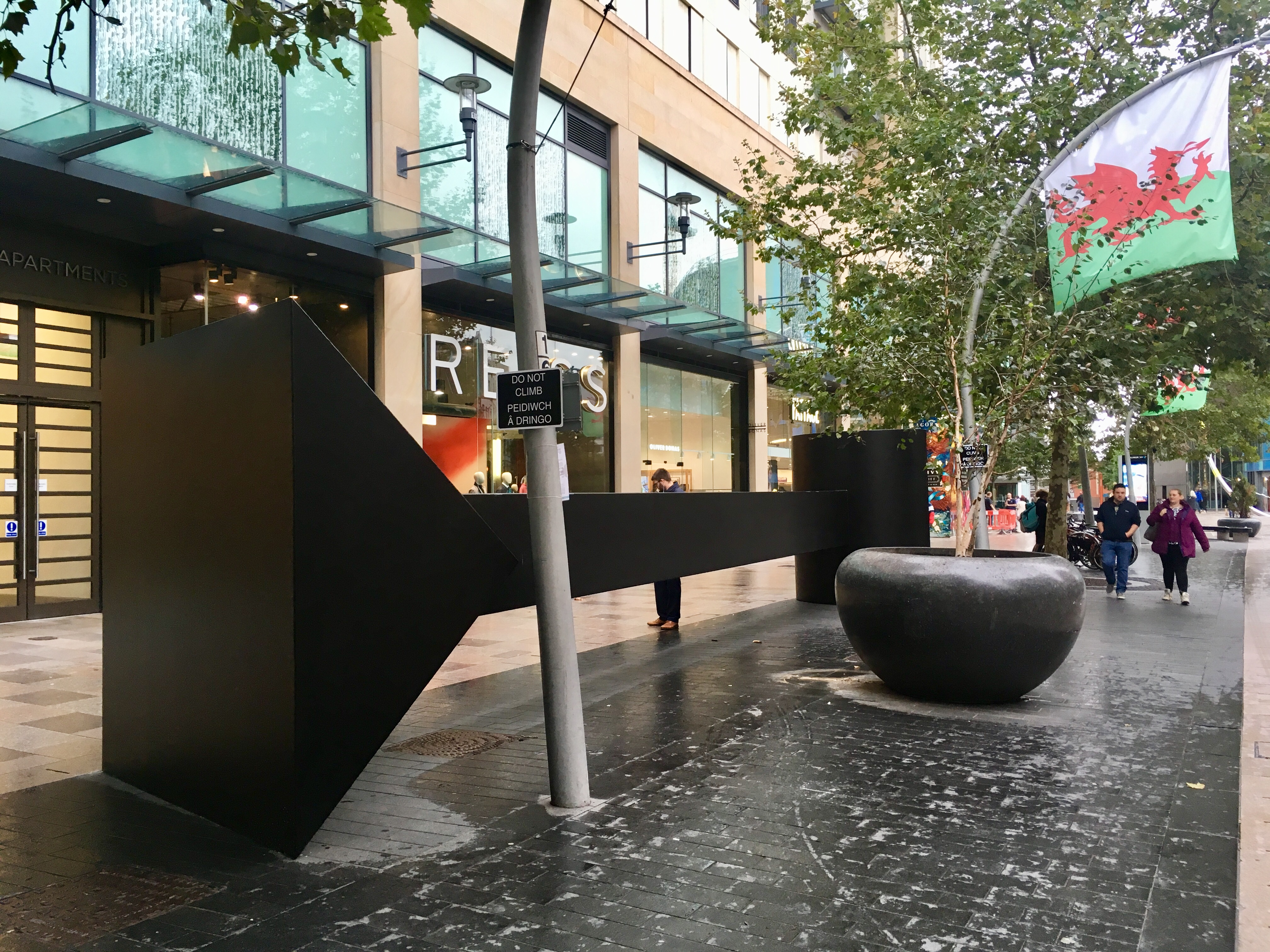
Untitled on The Hayes in September 2019

Untitled is a 1972 sculpture by Garth Evans.

It was created as part of the Peter Stuyvesant City Sculpture project. 16 new sculptures were created for the project and placed in eight cities in the United Kingdom. The piece was placed on The Hayes in central Cardiff for six months. In 2019 the sculpture was restored and placed in its original position on The Hayes for six months from September 2019 to March 2020.

The sculpture was located in Leicestershire after its original display, and remained unseen by the public. In collaboration with Art Happens with Art Fund, a crowd funding campaign saw the piece restored and placed back on display on The Hayes.

Evans created the piece as a response to his childhood in Pencoed, a mining village near Bridgend. His grandfather and maternal uncles were coal miners. Evans said that "As a child, I spent summers in South Wales and I vividly remember listening to my uncles and other men talk of their lives underground, in the dark. I wanted to make something that I felt had a connection to the coal mining and steel making industries of South Wales". Evans recorded the responses of the public to the original siting of the sculpture in 1972; these responses inspired a play, The Cardiff Tapes, which was subsequently performed in New York City.

The piece has been likened to a "hammer-like tool" and its black form resembling the tunnel of a mine.
