= Robert Thomas (sculptor) =

Welsh sculptor (1926–1999)

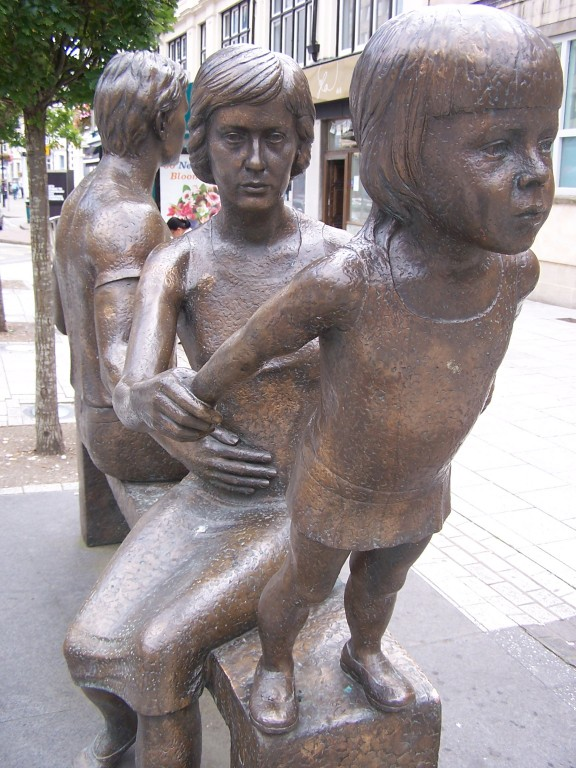
- The Family at Cardiff Queen Street
- Born: 1 August 1926; Cwmparc, Rhondda, Wales
- Died: 11 May 1999 (aged 72); Cardiff, Wales
- Known for: Sculpture
- Movement: Rhondda Group

Robert Thomas (1 August 1926 – 11 May 1999) was a Welsh sculptor born in Cwmparc in the Rhondda Valley. He is best known for his work in bronze sculptures, many of which are on public display. He was one of the members of the 'Rhondda Group'.

== Life history ==
Having attended the Cardiff School of Art in the late 1940s, Thomas gained entry to the Royal College of Art in London and lived there until 1971. Between 1953 and 1971 he taught at various art schools including Gravesend, Maidenhead and Ealing before returning to Wales to live in Barry. Thomas received his first major commission in 1965, creating a bust of then Secretary of State for Wales, Jim Griffiths. This was followed by works of Lord Edmund Davies and Welsh comic and entertainer Ryan Davies.

Thomas received several commissions that are now public works of art, with permanent residency in major city centres. These include Hebe in Birmingham city centre (at 52.484438°N 1.892175°W) and Aneurin Bevan in Cardiff. He has also produced busts, one of which, again of Aneurin Bevan, is located in the Houses of Parliament.

Thomas's Mother and Child sculpture, commissioned for the building of a new shopping precinct at Coalville, Leicestershire won him the Sir Otto Beit prize for 1963.

In 1999 one of Thomas' last works was unveiled, a statue of Isambard Kingdom Brunel in Neyland, unveiled by Prince Charles. The bronze statue required a sum of £30,000 from a local committee.

== Cardiff Sculptures ==
Robert Thomas sculptures are prominently displayed in Cardiff Queen Street, in the heart of the Welsh capital's shopping district. He has four on display there (i) Nye Bevan (at the head of Queen Street, opposite the Castle); (ii) Mother and Son; (iii) The Family; and (iv) The Miner.

Additionally, there is a bronze sculpture called The Girl at Gorsedd Gardens, opposite the National Museum.

== Gallery of Robert Thomas work ==
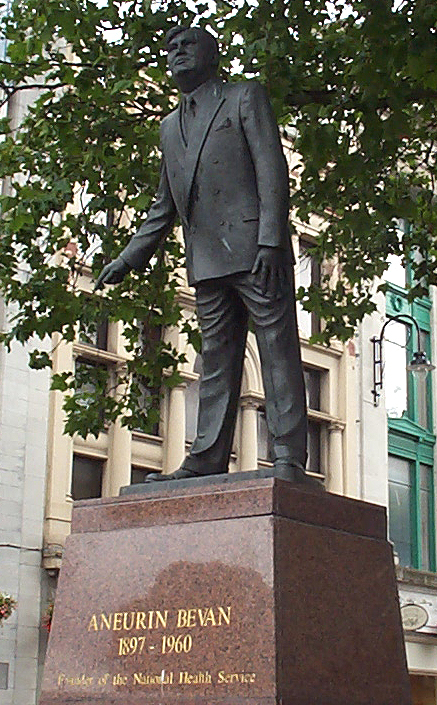
Statue of Aneurin Bevan in Cardiff Queen Street

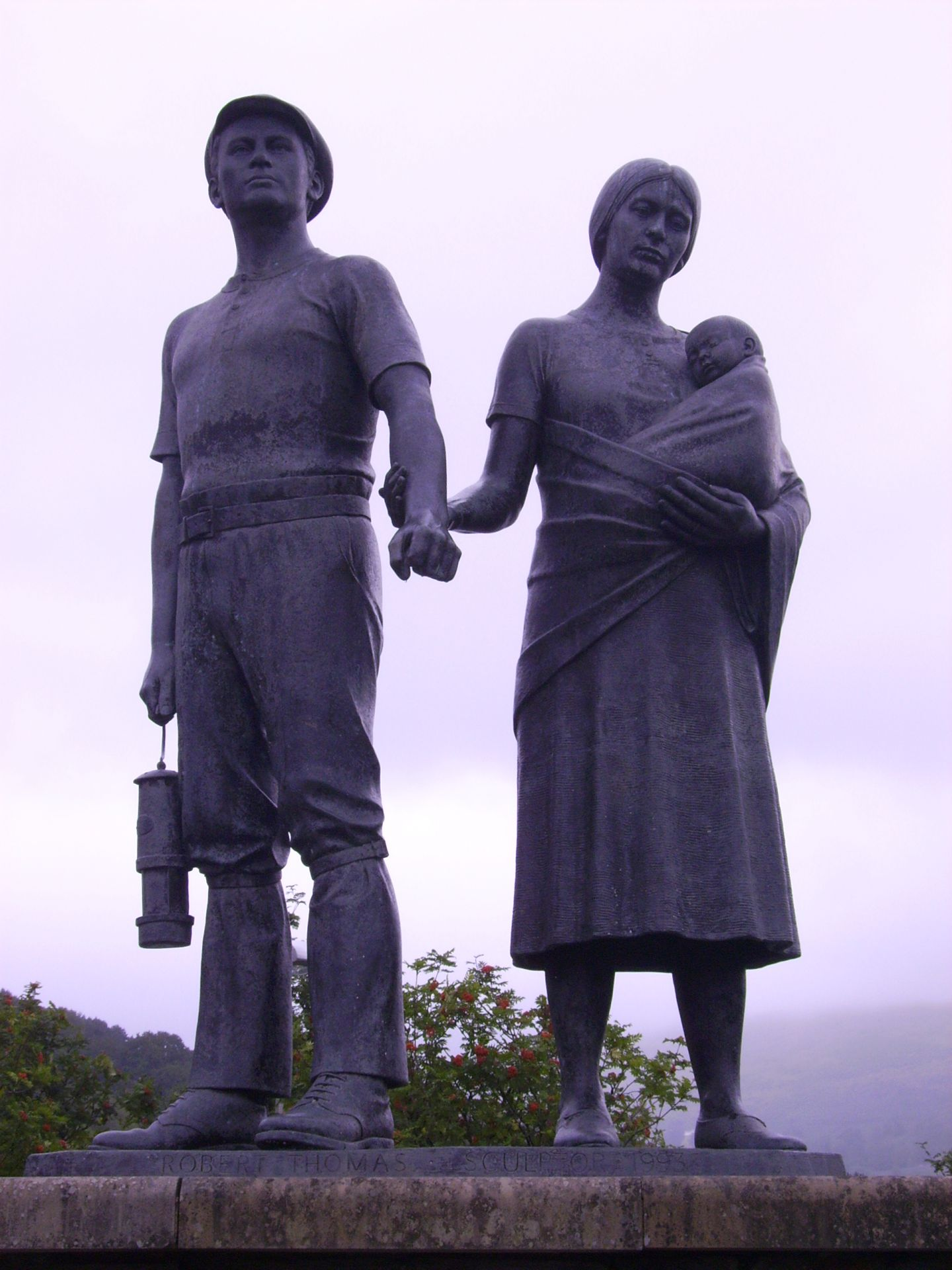
Miner's Family (1993), Rhondda Valley
