= Pierhead Building =

Grade I listed building in Cardiff, Wales

- Adeilad y Pierhead
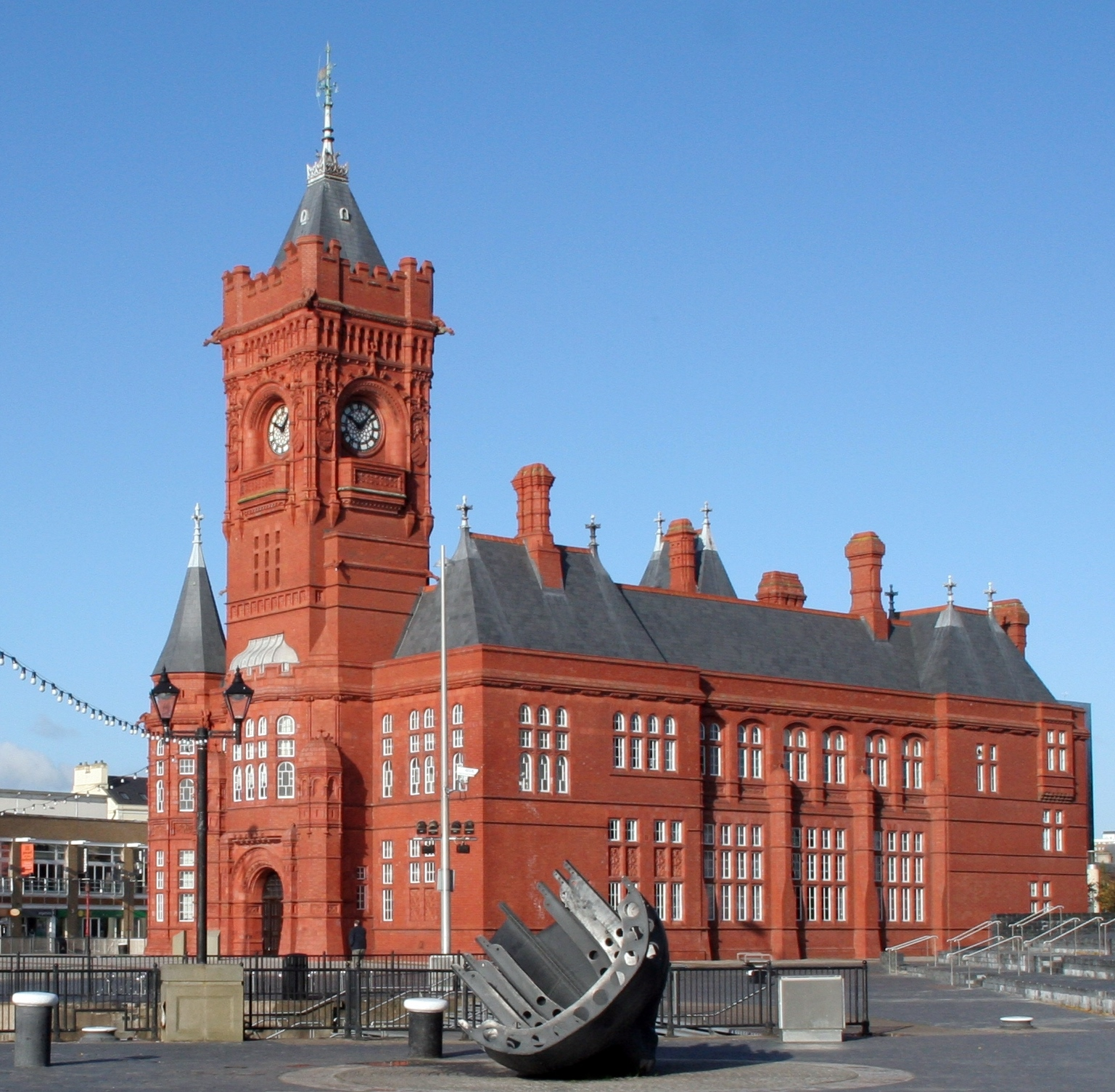
- Interactive map of the Pierhead Building area

General information
- Architectural style: French Gothic Renaissance
- Location: Cardiff, Wales, Cardiff, Wales
- Coordinates: 51.463539°N 3.163389°W
- Inaugurated: 1897

Design and construction
- Architect: William Frame

Website
- pierhead.org

The Pierhead Building (Welsh: Adeilad y Pierhead) is a Grade I listed building in Cardiff Bay, Wales. It was built in 1897 as the headquarters for the Bute Dock Company.

The Pierhead Building is part of the estate of the Senedd (Welsh Parliament; Welsh: Senedd Cymru), which also includes the Senedd building and Tŷ Hywel. The clock on the building is unofficially known as the "Baby Big Ben" or the "Big Ben of Wales".

== History ==
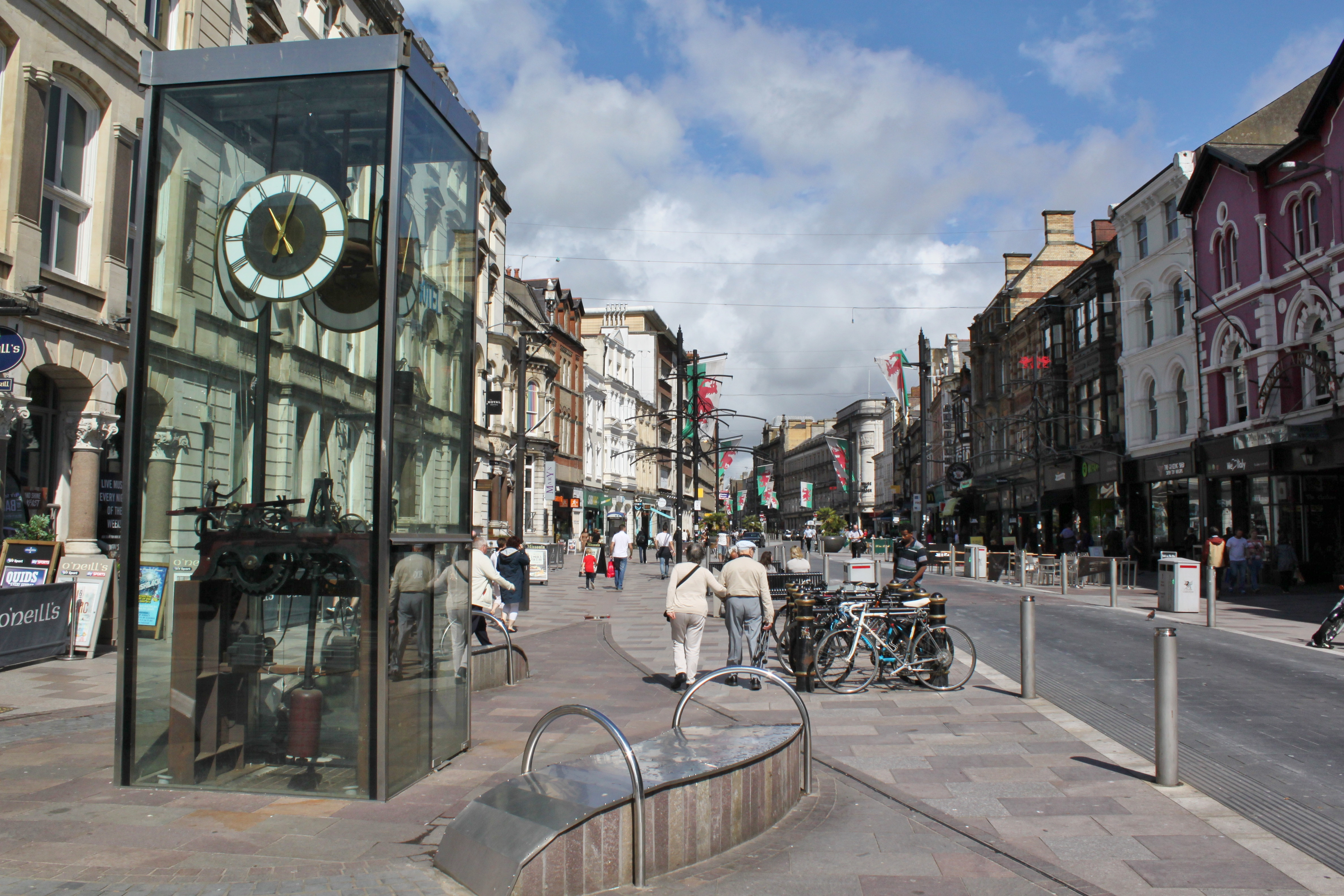
The old clock mechanism in St Mary Street

The building was built in 1897 and designed by the English architect William Frame. It was a replacement for the headquarters of the Bute Dock Company which burnt down in 1892. Frame's mentor was William Burges, with whom he worked on the rebuilding of Cardiff Castle and Castell Coch until Burges's death in 1881.

The Bute Dock Company was renamed the Cardiff Railway Company in 1897. A coat of arms on the building's façade bears the company's motto "Wrth ddŵr a thân" ("by water and fire"), encapsulating the elements creating the steam power which transformed Wales.

The building became the administrative office for the Port of Cardiff in 1947.

The 1897 clock mechanism, by William Potts & Sons of Leeds, was removed and replaced with an electronic motor, and auctioned off by British Rail and sold to an American collector in 1973. It was returned to Cardiff in 2005 and in 2011 was restored by Smith of Derby Group and installed as a piece of contemporary art created by the artist Marianne Forrest in Cardiff city centre.

== Architecture ==
Incorporating a French-Gothic Renaissance theme, the Pierhead boasts details such as hexagonal chimneys, carved friezes, gargoyles, and a highly ornamental and distinctive clock tower. Its exterior is finished in glazed terracotta blocks supplied at the end of the 19th century by J. C. Edwards & Co. of Acrefair, near Ruabon in Wrexham County Borough; they were once described as one of the most successful producers of terracotta in the world. These features, along with the Pierhead's role in the development of the docks, Cardiff and industrial Wales, earned it the status of a Grade I listed building.

== Re-opening ==
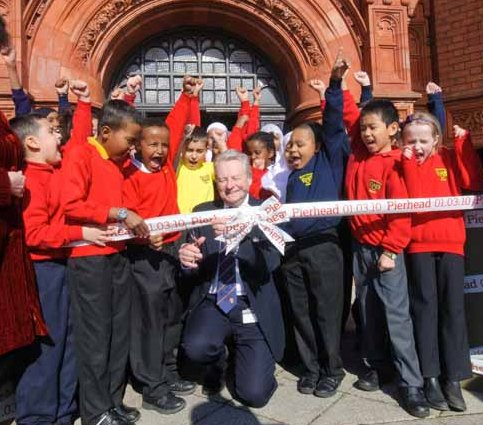
The 2010 re-opening of the Pierhead Building by Dafydd Elis-Thomas, then the Presiding Officer of the National Assembly

The building was re-opened in May 2010 as "The Assembly at the Pierhead", a visitor and education centre for the National Assembly for Wales. The exhibition provided visitors with information on the Assembly.

On 1 March 2010 the building re-opened again to the public as a Welsh history museum and exhibition. It contains a number of films and exhibits exploring Welsh history as well as spaces for use as venues for public debate and Senedd-sponsored events, where people can express their views about what takes place in the nearby Senedd building itself.

Artefacts on display include the original binnacle (the stand housing the ship's compass) from Robert Falcon Scott's ship the Terra Nova, and the Pennal Letter sent by Owain Glyndŵr, Prince of Wales, to Charles VI of France in 1406. Another feature is an audio-visual display of Welsh heroes who have made significant contributions to Wales's cultural and political identity, such as the former prime minister David Lloyd George, the fashion designer Laura Ashley and the late rugby player and broadcaster Ray Gravell.

Films and exhibits explore the history of Cardiff Bay from the Neolithic era onwards and show how iron ore and coal exports made Cardiff one of the busiest ports in the world. They describe the impact of the coming of railways from 1841, which meant that goods could be transported as far in an hour as they would have been in a month using the canal system. They also illustrate how, following the crisis of a steep drop in demand for coal in the 1920s, and its decline as a port for container ships from the 1950s, Cardiff Bay entered a difficult period, ending with its regeneration at the century's close.

== Gallery ==
Views of the Pierhead Building
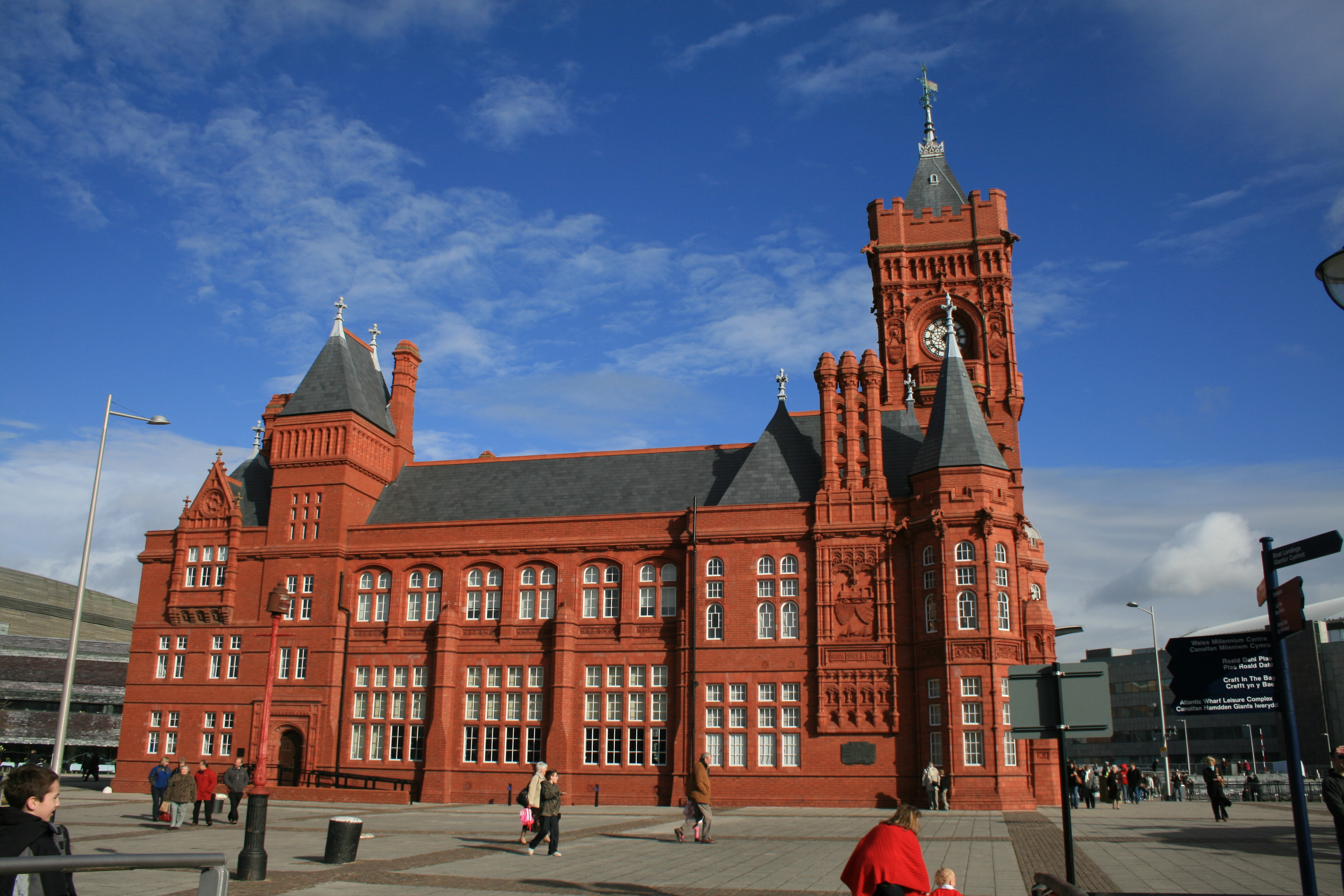
Western façade

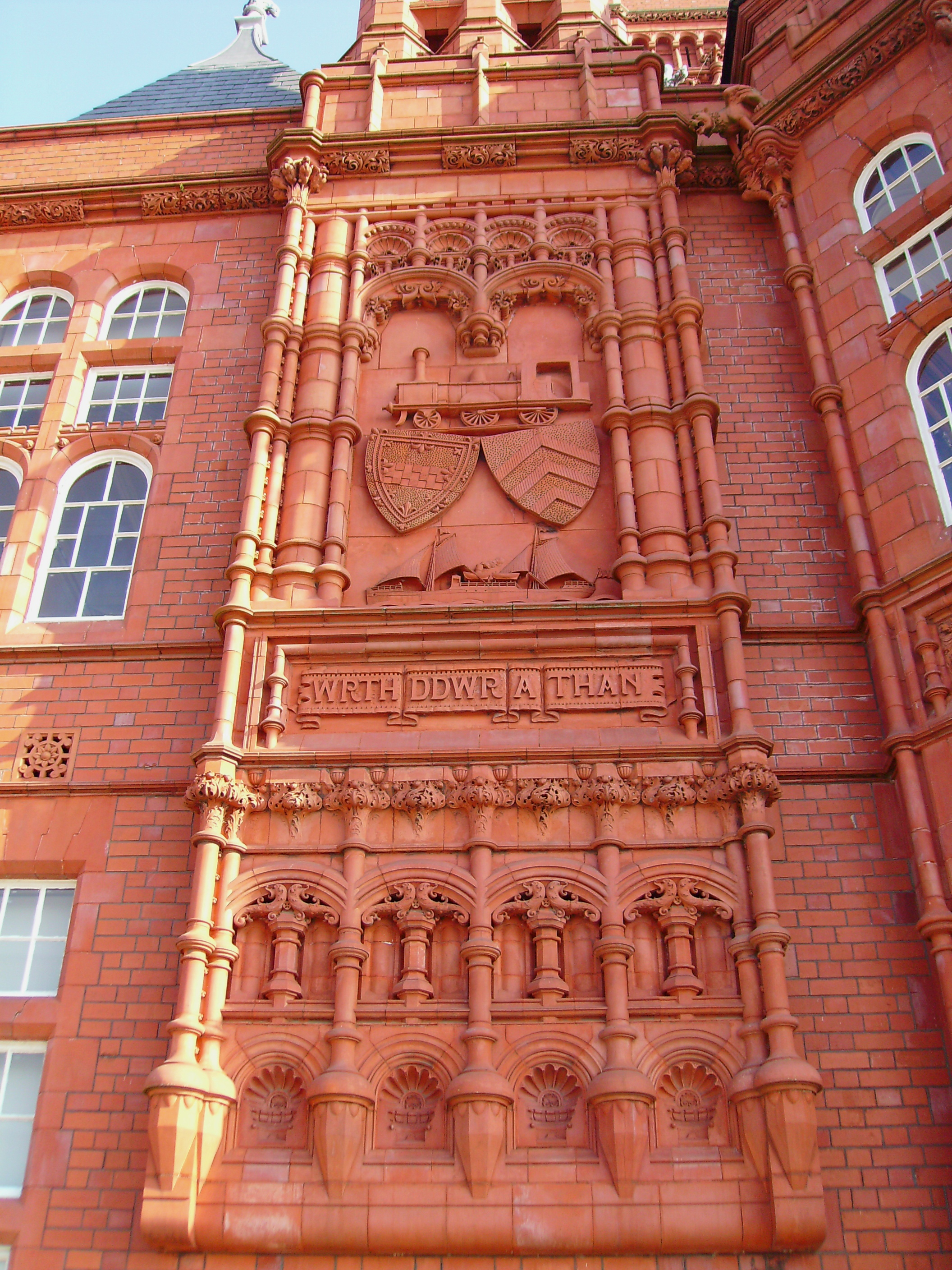
Detail of a terracotta panel

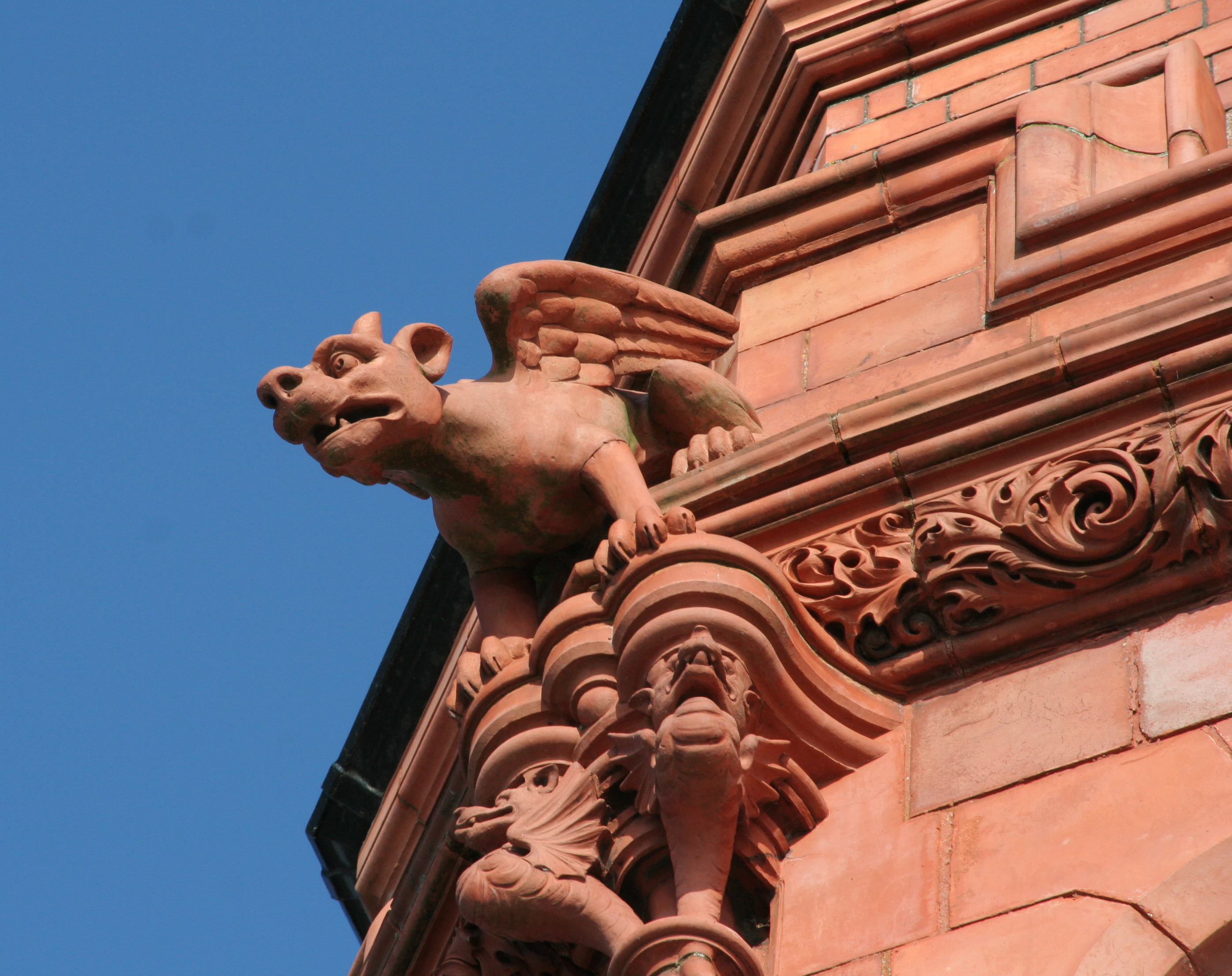
Detail of a terracotta gargoyle in the form of a dragon

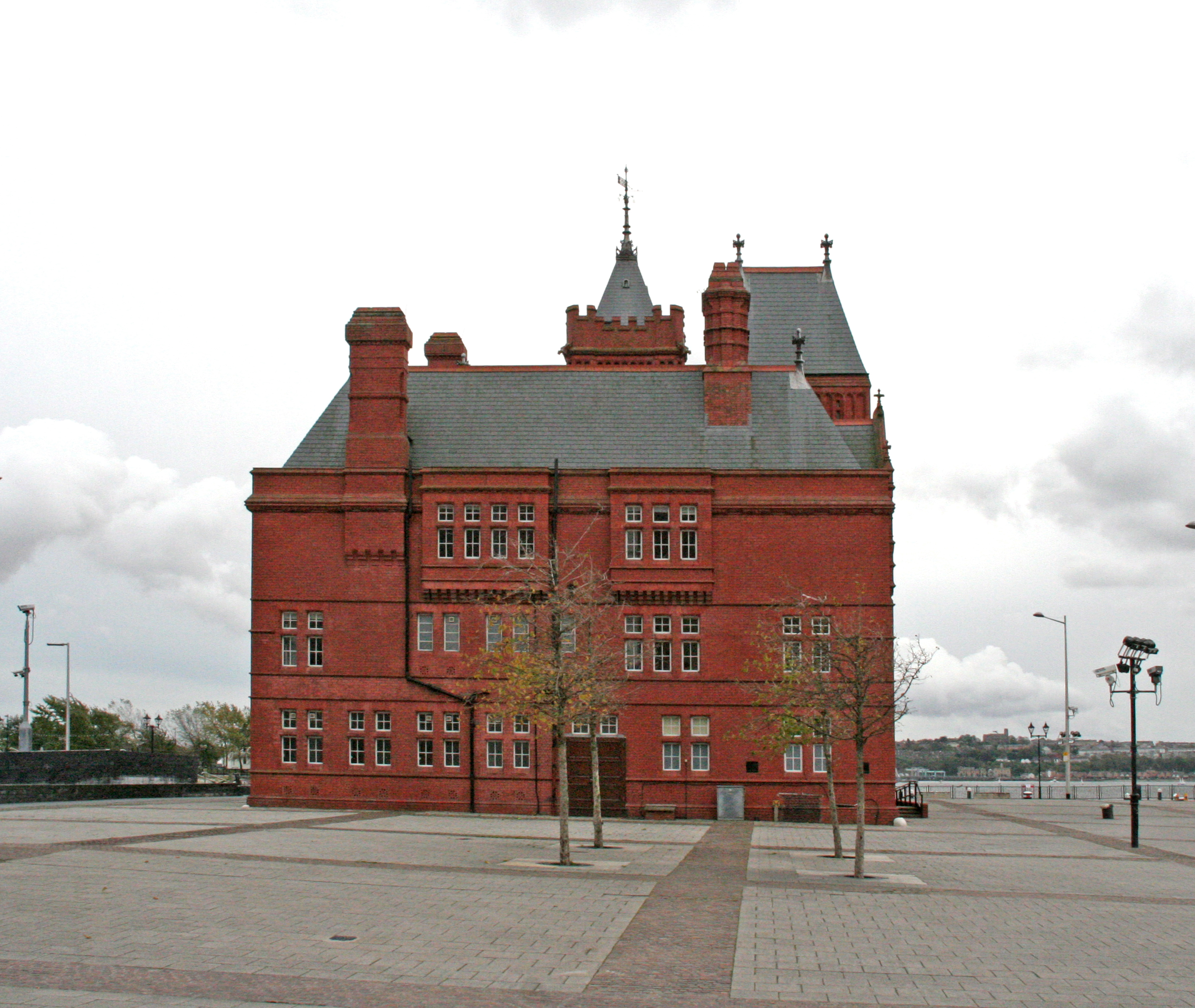
Northern (rear) façade

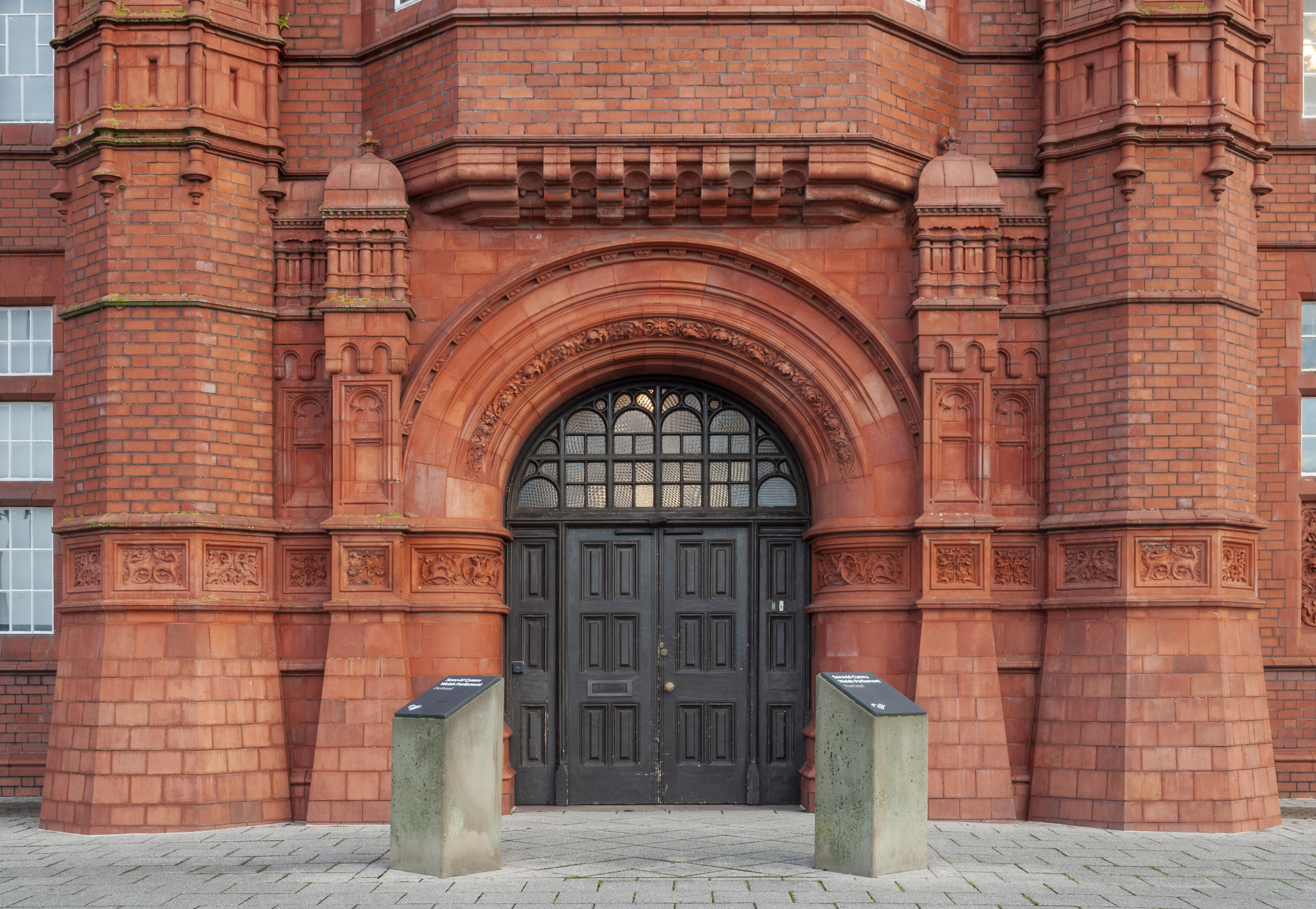
Detail of the front entrance

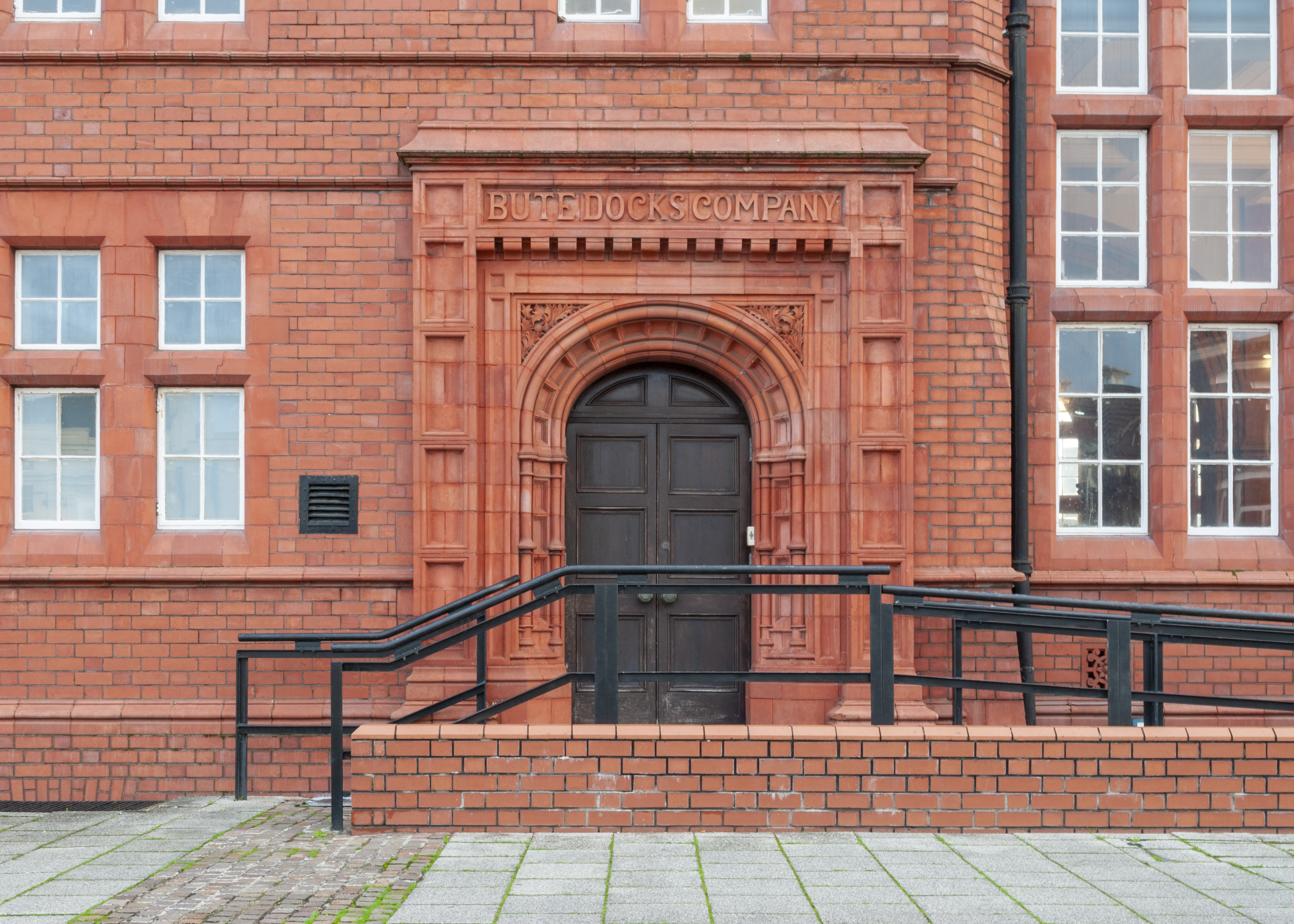
Detail of the side entrance on the western façade

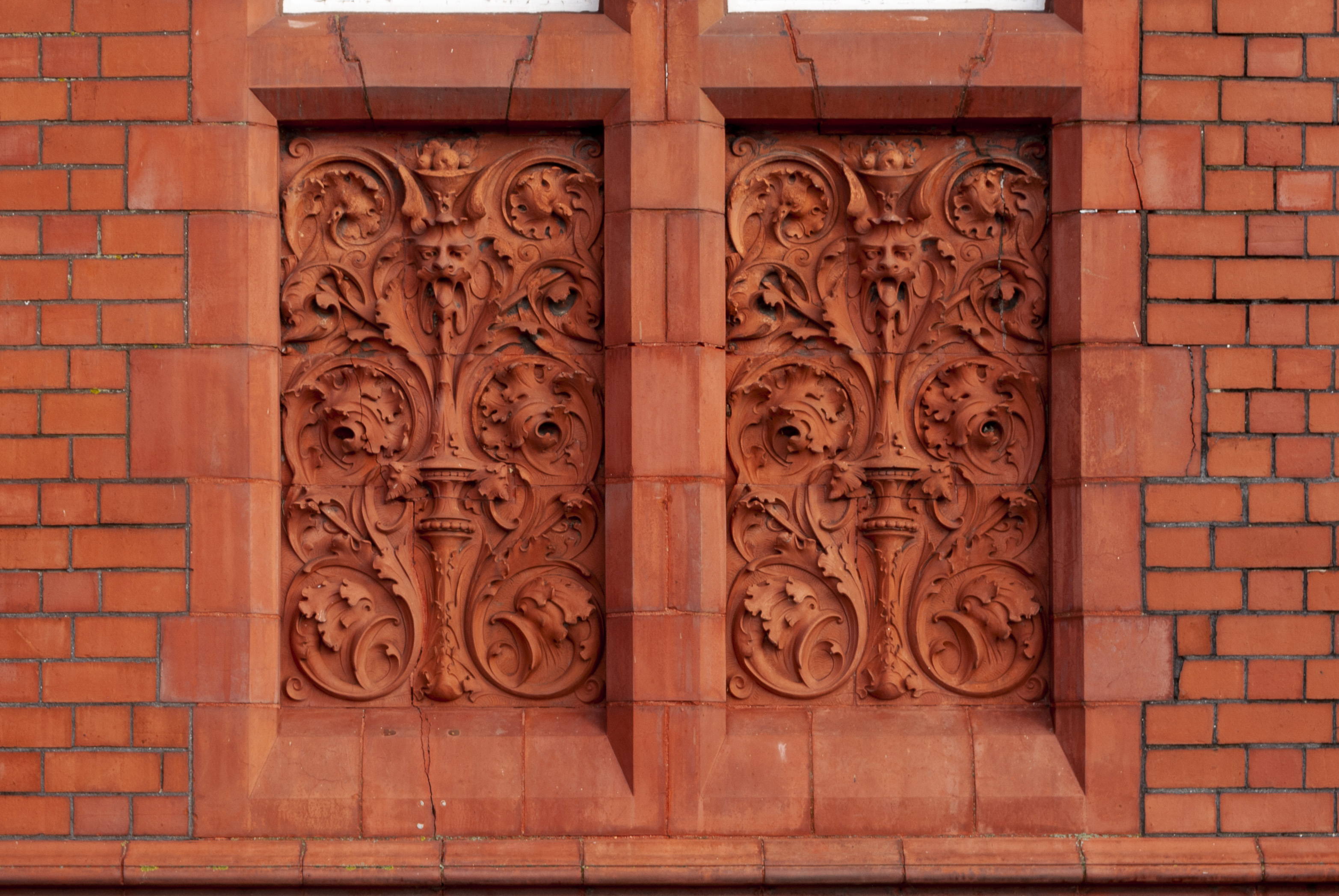
Terracotta panels on the southern façade

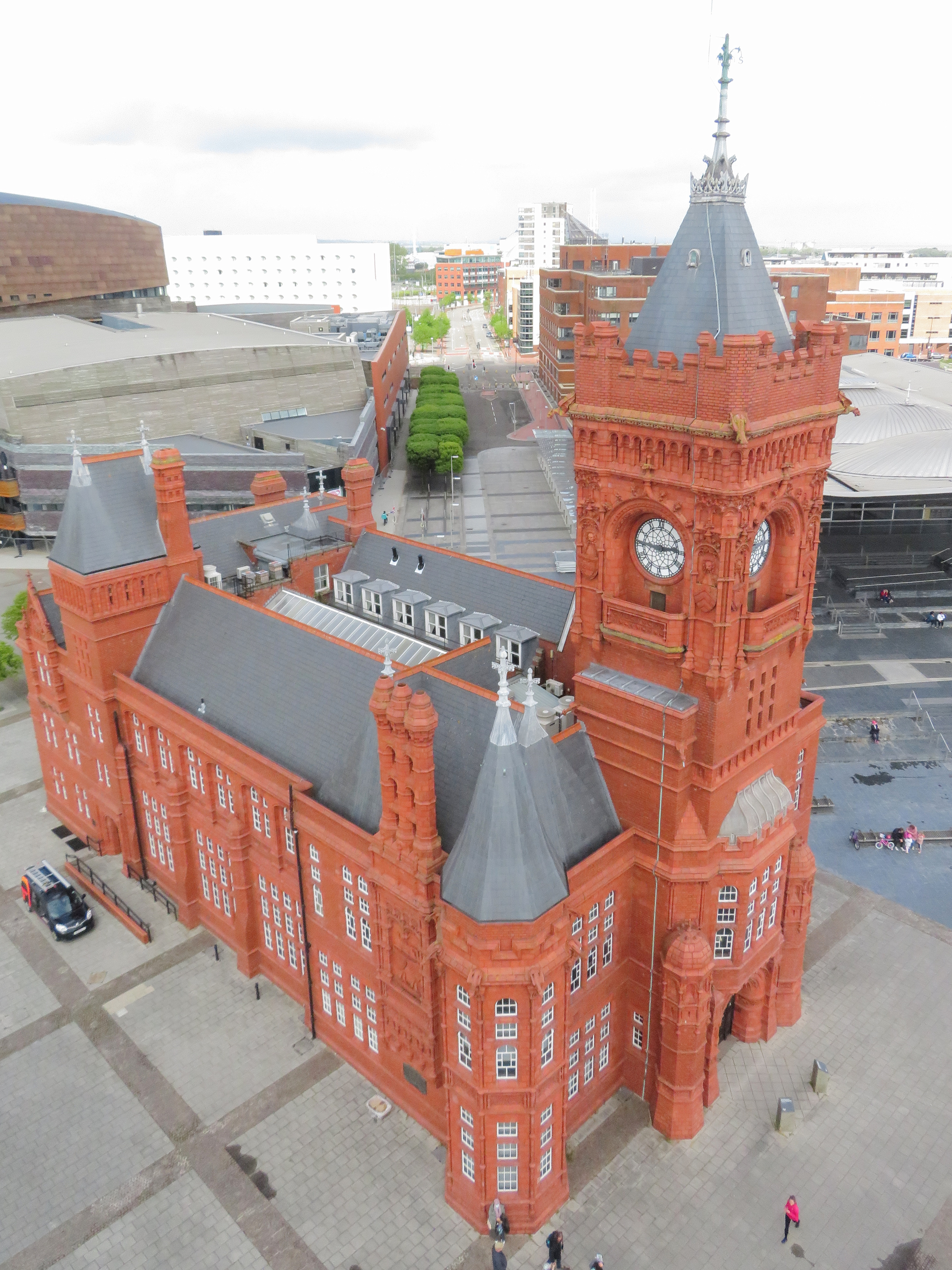
Overhead view

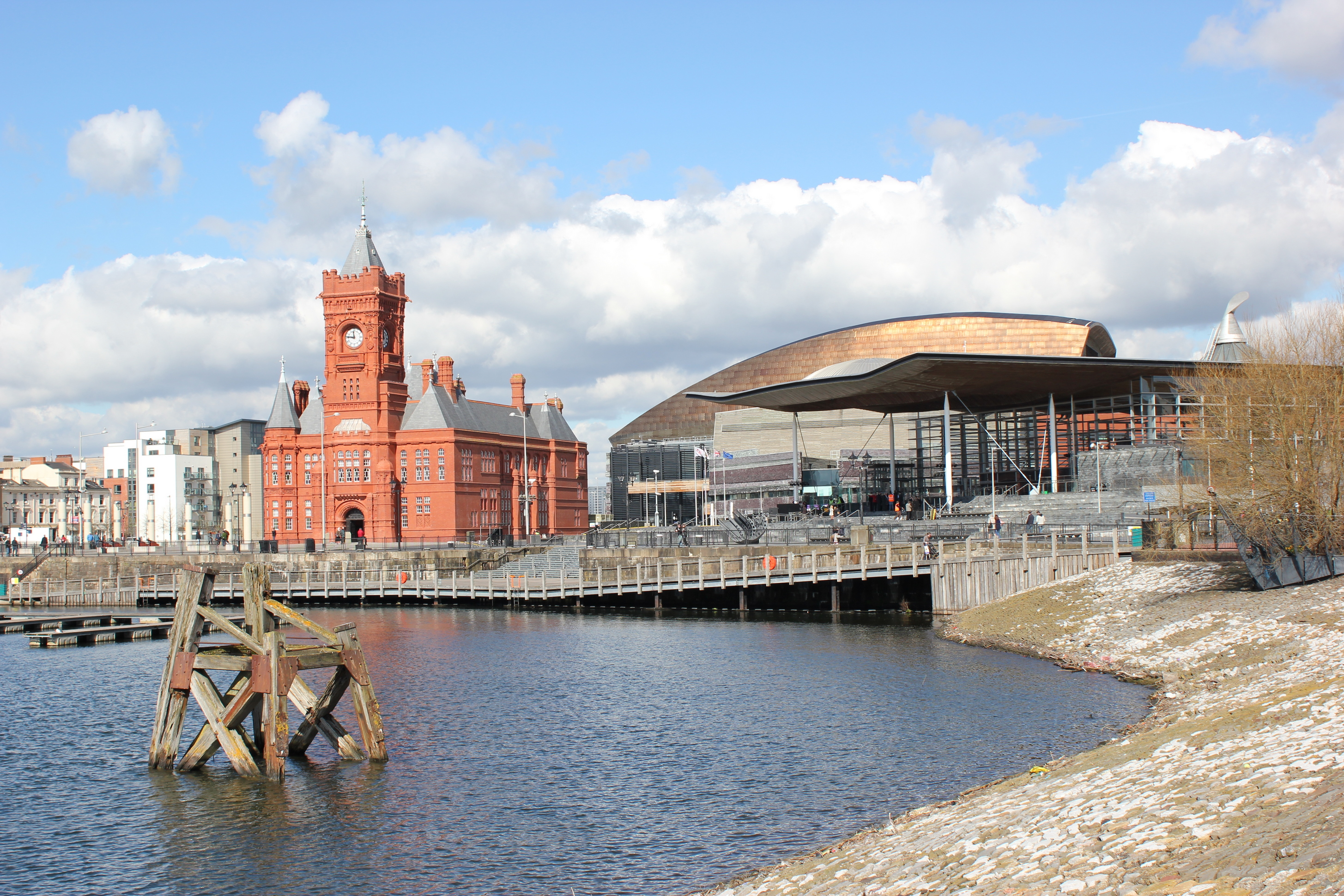
The Senedd building to the right and the Wales Millennium Centre in the background
