= Garth Evans =

British sculptor

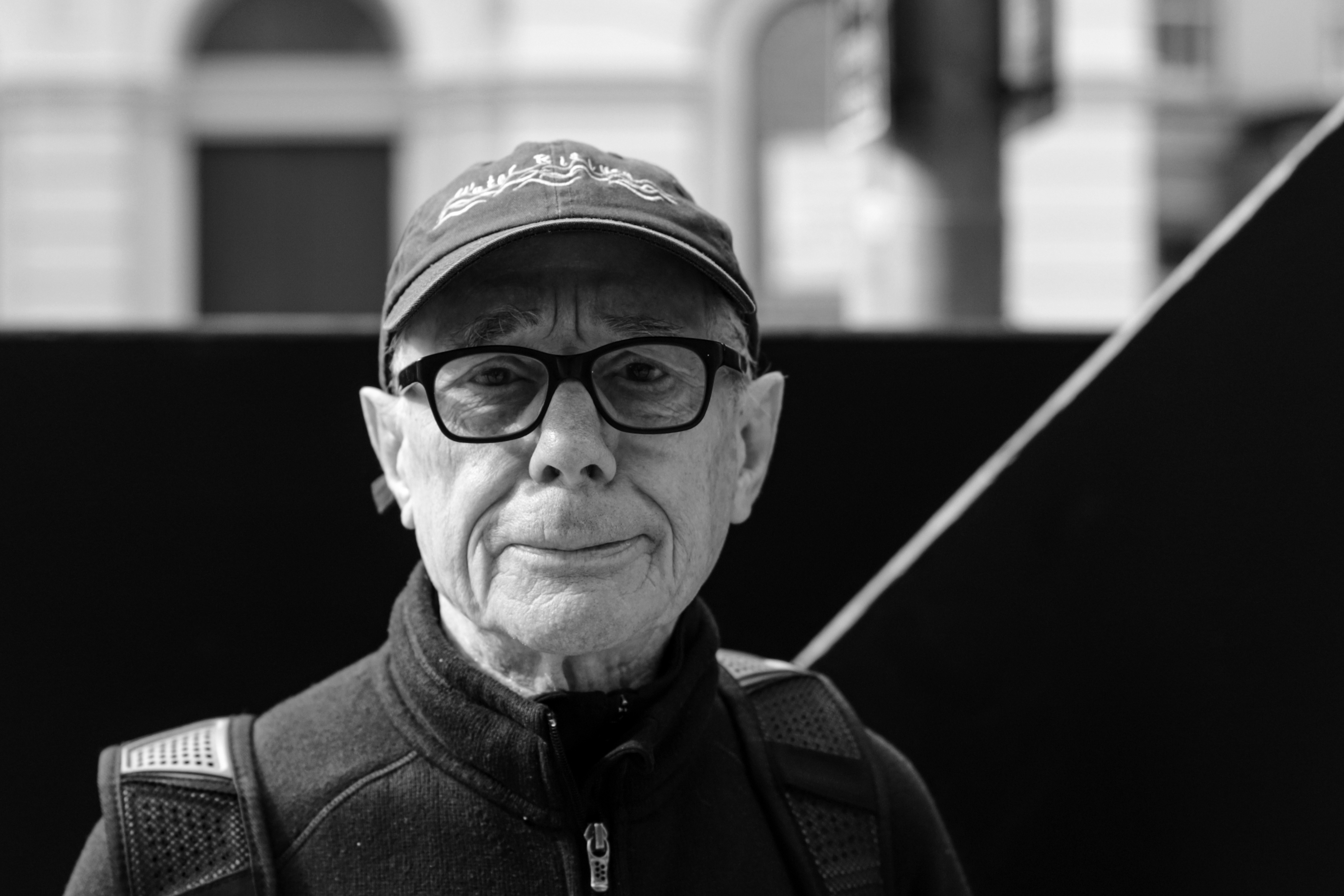
A portrait of Garth Evans in front of his sculpture on The Hayes, Cardiff City Centre, 2020.

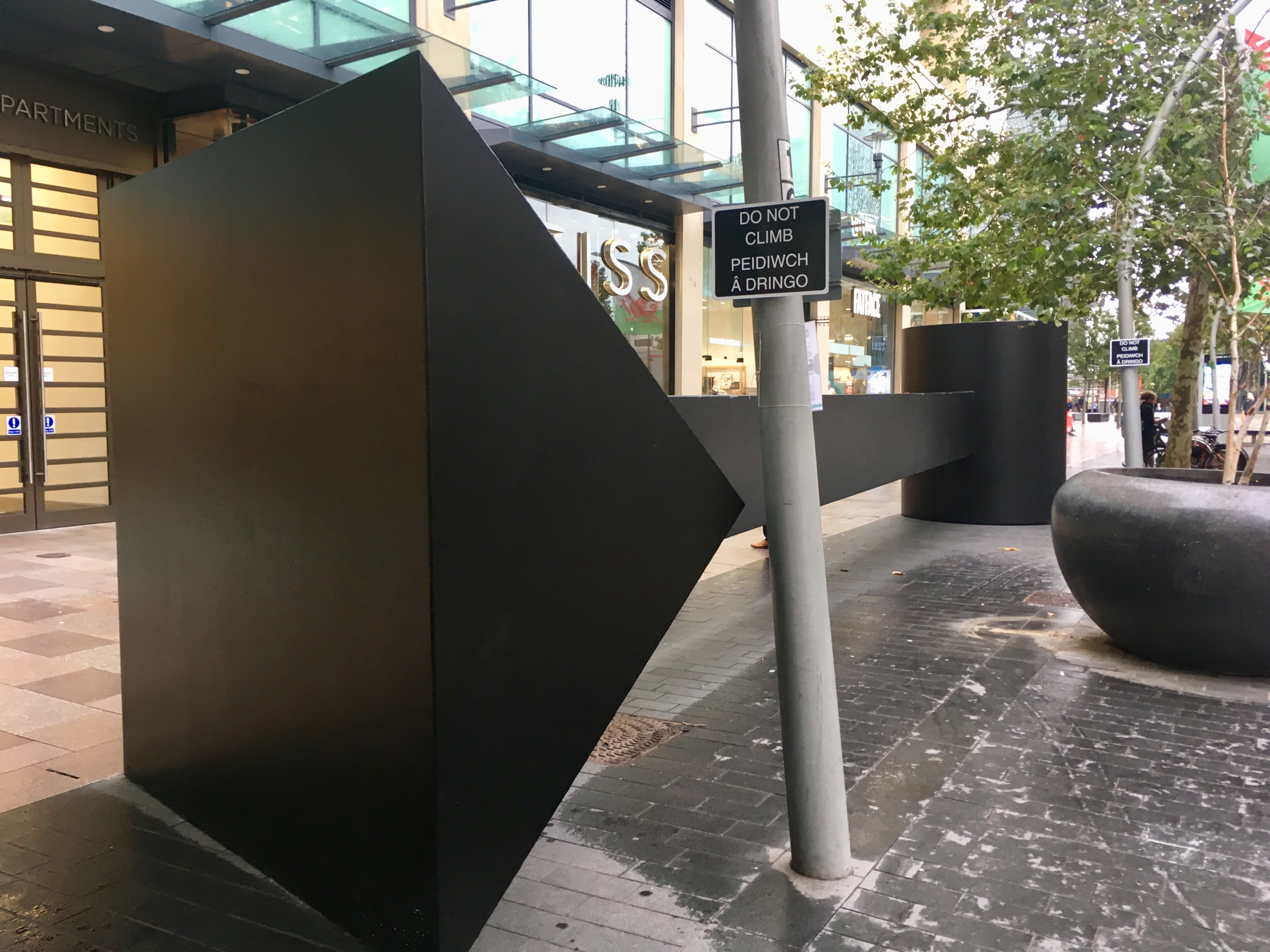
Sculpture on The Hayes, Cardiff, September 2020

Garth Evans (born 1934) is a British sculptor and former college lecturer at St Martin's School of Art, London.

== Background ==
Evans' mother was from Pencoed, her father and brothers were South Wales coalminers. He was born in Cheshire in 1934 and studied at the Slade School of Art in London.

== Career ==
Evans exhibited widely in the 1960s and 1970s including in the group exhibitions British Sculpture '72 at the Royal Academy of Arts (1972) and The Condition of Sculpture at the Hayward Gallery (1975). He had a survey exhibition of his work at the Yorkshire Sculpture Park in 2013.

Evans describes his sculptures as figurative. His works were known for their size and grand statements, though they became smaller and less dramatic from the late-1970s onwards.

He has been recipient of a number of awards including the Guggenheim Fellowship and the Pollock-Krasner Foundation Award.

== Notable works ==
Evans created some site-specific sculptures in South Wales in the early 1970s. These included a 40-foot-long unnamed sculpture in coal-black steel, which was installed on The Hayes, Cardiff, in early May 1972. It was inspired by Evans' family stories about the South Wales coalmining (and steel) industry. The sculpture was commissioned by the Peter Stuyvesant Foundation for their City Sculpture Project and intended to remain on site for six months. It subsequently moved to Leicestershire where it was put into storage, after being repainted green. In September 2019 it was returned to Cardiff by Chapter Arts Centre, restored and repainted after a £16,000 crowdfunding campaign, then reinstalled close to its original location in The Hayes. A short documentary film was due to be created, based on people's memories of the sculpture.

A number of Evans' works are in the permanent collection of the Tate Galleries. White Relief No.14 is in the collection of Rugby Art Gallery and Museum.
