= Dilnot =

Dilnot is a surname. Notable people with the surname include:

- Andrew Dilnot (born 1960), Welsh economist and broadcaster
- Frank Dilnot (1875–1946), English author and journalist
- Giles Dilnot (born 1971), British television presenter
- Peter Dilnot (born 1952), Australian rules footballer
