= Central Square, Cardiff =

Public space and transport hub in Wales

Central Square
- Sgwâr Canolog
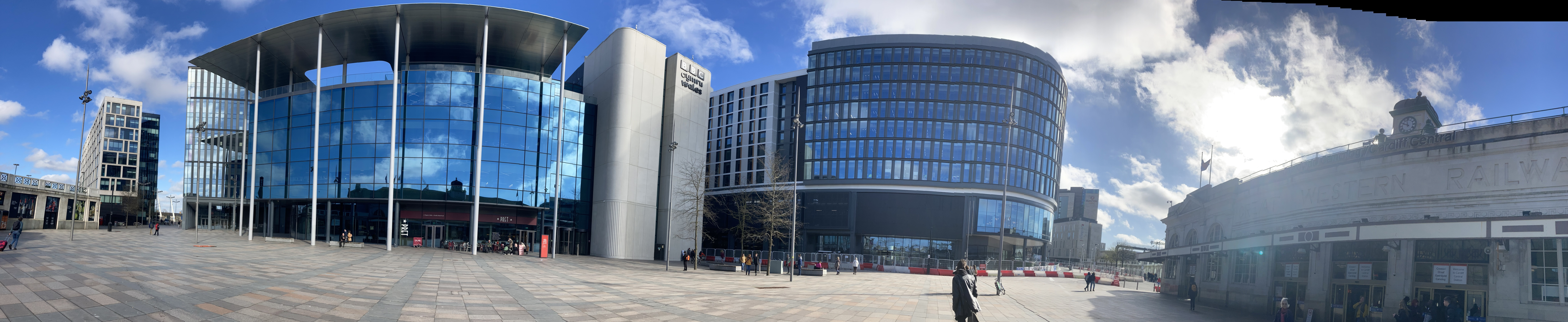
- Panoramic view of Central Square in 2023
- Interactive map of Central Square
- Type: Pedestrian only
- Addresses: 1–6 Central Square
- Location: Cardiff
- Postal code: CF10
- Nearest Railway station: Cardiff Central
- Coordinates: 51.4762°N 3.1787°W

Other
- Designer: Foster and Partners (Gerard Evenden)
- Website: centralsquarecardiff.co.uk

Central Square (Welsh: Sgwâr Canolog) is a large public space in Cardiff, Wales, adjacent to Cardiff Central railway station and included Cardiff Central bus station between 1954 and 2015. It was redeveloped and extended in the late 2010s and early 2020s.

== History ==
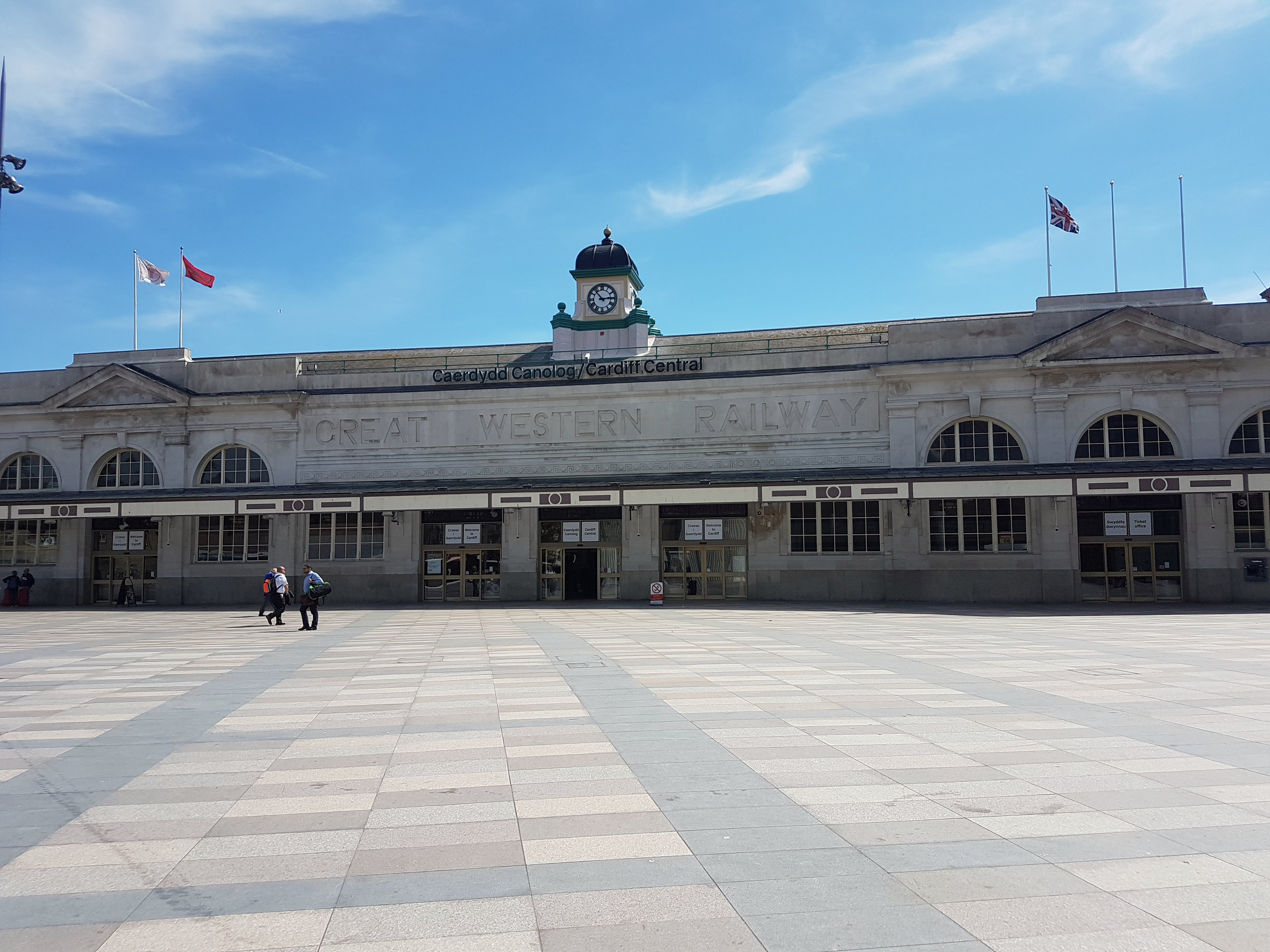
Cardiff Central railway station as seen from Central Square in May 2019

Until the 1930s an area of terraced housing, churches and shops, named Temperance Town, occupied the current site of Central Square. As a result, due to its legal history, Central Square is now one of a few areas in Cardiff designated an alcohol control zone, allowing the police to confiscate alcohol.

Between 1932 and 1934, the Great Western Railway replaced the original 1850s station building (also designed by their architect's department) with a new Art Deco building faced in Portland stone, enclosing a booking hall with noted Art Deco light fittings, all topped by a clock cupola. The Great Western Railway has its full name carved onto the façade (larger than the name of the station). During the new station's planning and construction, the GWR made representations to Cardiff Corporation to improve the immediate area. As a result, from 1930 the Corporation started to plan the removal of the adjacent working-class district, Temperance Town.

The streets of Temperance Town were demolished in 1937, although the intervention of World War II halted redevelopment plans until after the war. A new bus station was opened in 1954, and a new office building, Marland House, was constructed to the east of the bus station.

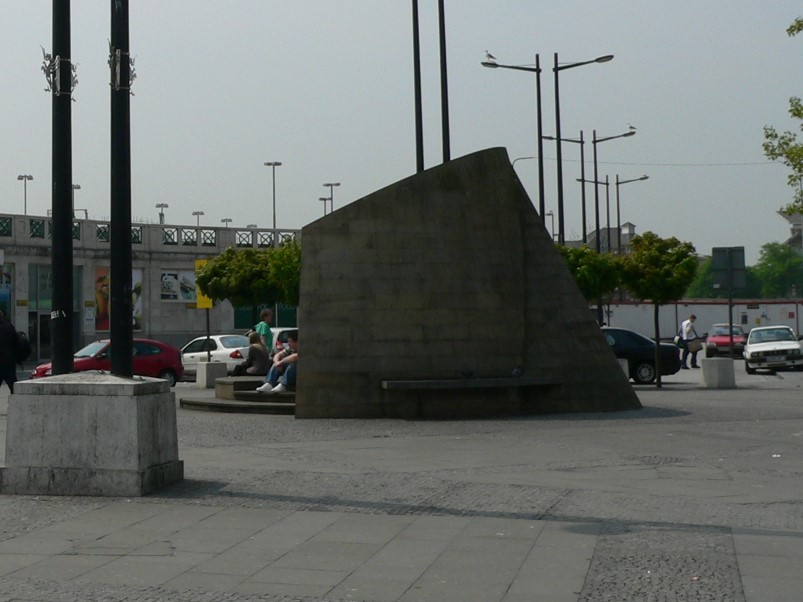
The sculpture Cader Idris, in Central Square in 2006. Later moved to Cardiff Bay Wetlands Reserve

In 1999 a 4-metre-high (13 ft) sculpture, Cader Idris (named after the mountain Cadair Idris) was erected in Central Square. However, within six months it was reportedly described as a "dirty disgrace" and (in 2008) it was reportedly attracting undesirables to congregate on it. It was later dismantled and relocated to Cardiff Bay Wetlands Reserve.

== Redevelopment ==
By the early 2010s, the 1950s office block Marland House, adjacent to a multi-storey car park, had become hard to let; plus, a number of shops were mostly occupied by charity shops. With the development of St David's/Dewi Sant complete, and the resultant pedestrianisation of St Mary Street, Cardiff Council was looking to redevelop the Square, with the aim of creating a modern transport gateway to Cardiff city centre.

In 2010, hotel developer Urban Solutions promised £300,000 towards improvements as part of the long-term regeneration of Central Square. They also agreed to fund twelve cycle stands and the OYBike hire point outside the railway station.

In 2012, another proposal was unveiled by Cardiff Council to sell off the existing bus station land for redevelopment and invest some of the money in Central Square, to be renamed "Capital Square". An 80-metre-long (260 ft) fountain was envisaged by the architects, Stride Treglown, along with a "Welsh Garden" reflecting the landscape of Wales. The bus station would close in September 2012 and a 10-12 storey office headquarters would be built on the site. A new bus station would be constructed to the east, after the demolition of Marland House.

In October 2014, another master plan was announced, this time led by Cardiff-based real estate development company Rightacres Property, including one million square feet (9.3 hectares) of new office space and a 200-bed hotel. The master plan was being overseen by Foster and Partners, led by Cardiff-born partner Gerard Evenden. As well as the original office space and hotel, the new plan also accommodated the relocated headquarters and main news studios of BBC Wales in a new building, New Broadcasting House.

Construction began in Autumn 2015 on buildings located on the old bus station, with Marland House scheduled for demolition from Summer 2016. There was also a proposed £80 million development of Cardiff Central station, with a two-floor shopping and retail area located above a new bus station, connected to the railway station through both structures' extensive use of glass.

One Central Square opened in 2016 for tenants including Blake Morgan LLP and Julian Hodge Bank. Two Central Square also opened in 2016 with tenants including Hugh James LLP and the Cardiff School of Journalism. In 2019, BBC Cymru Wales moved into Three Central Square, directly opposite the railway station. That same year, Cardiff Council confirmed that the Cardiff Transport Interchange would be built by 2023, located adjacent to the BBC as a replacement for the bus station. 6 Central Square, occupied by HM Revenue & Customs and named bilingually Tŷ William Morgan - William Morgan House, was completed in 2020.

Demolished buildings in Central Square
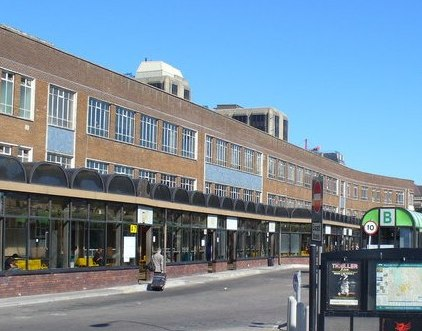
Cardiff Central bus station

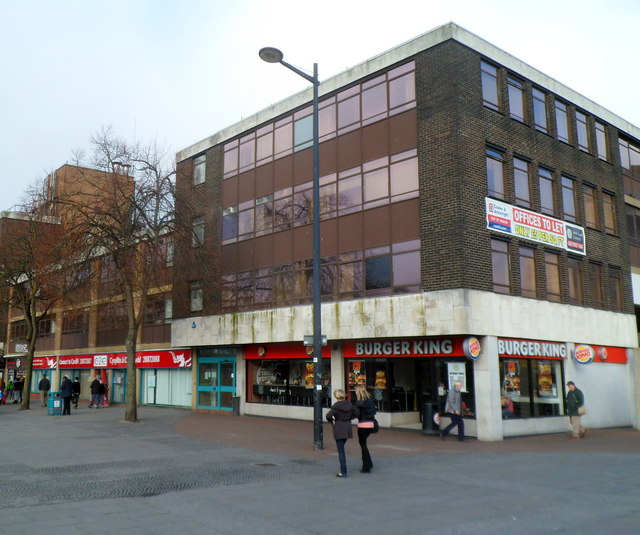
Marland House

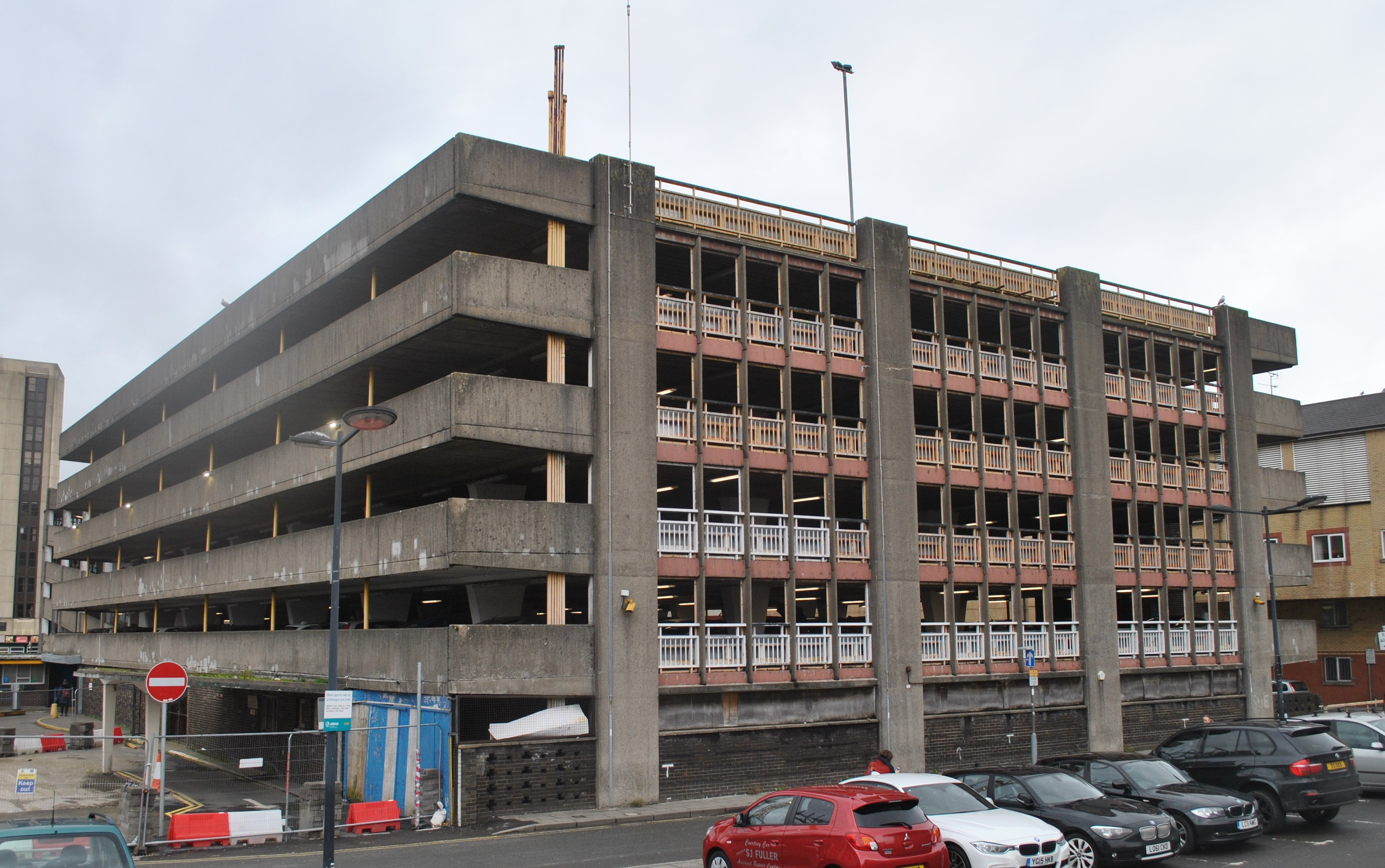
NCP Wood Street Car Park

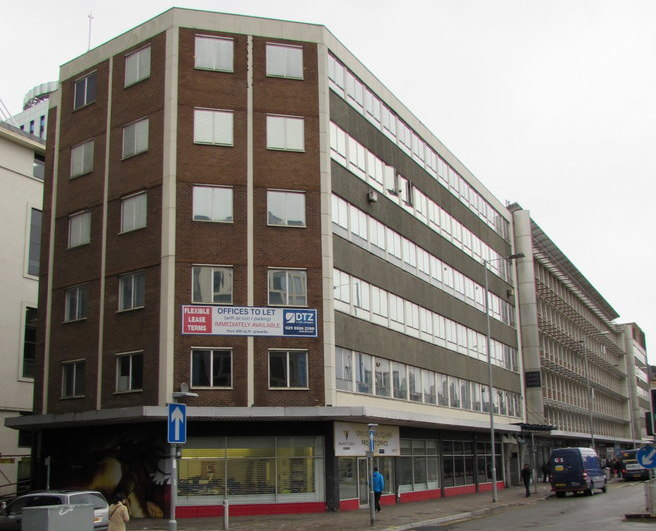
St Davids House

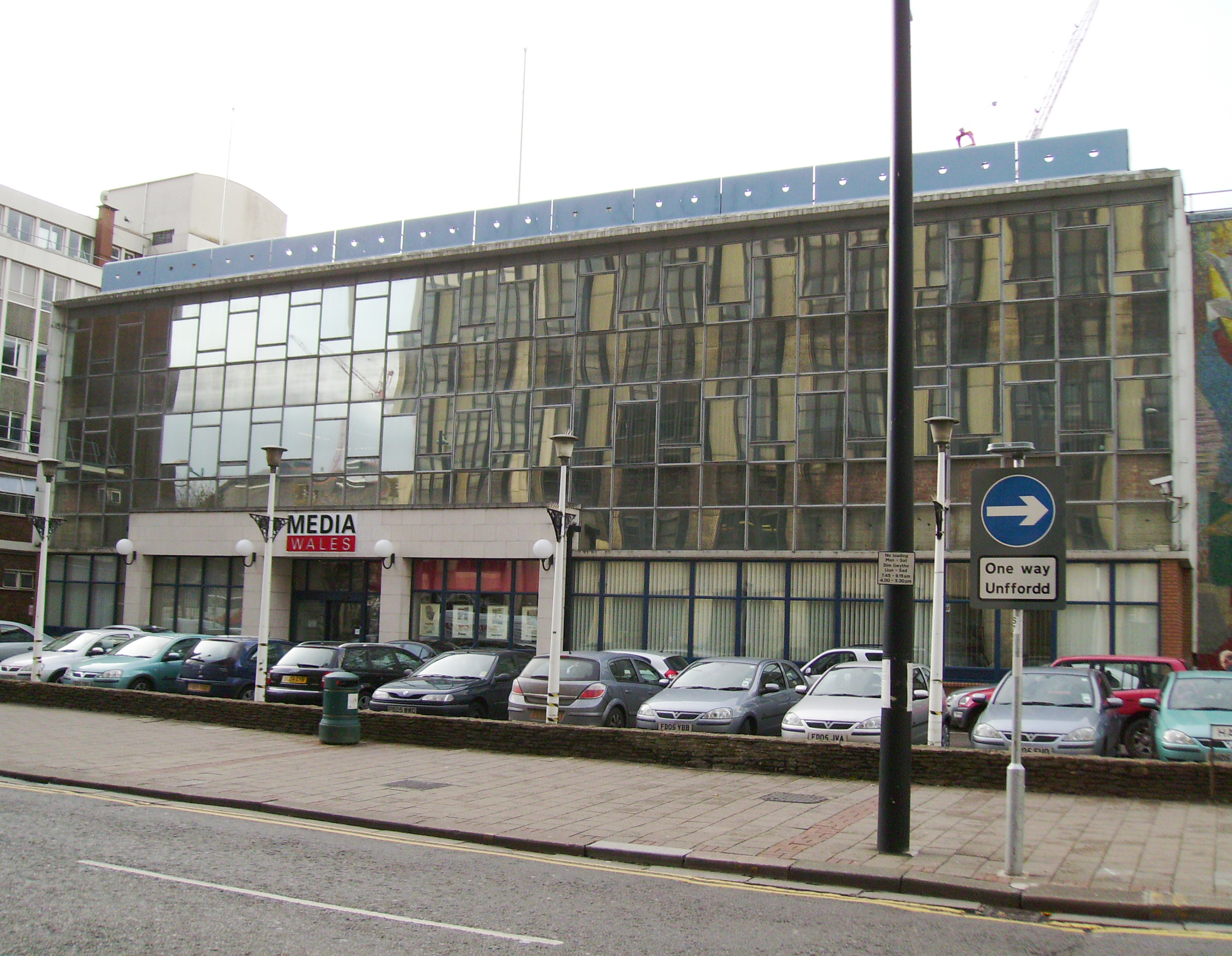
Thomson House
Redeveloped Central Square
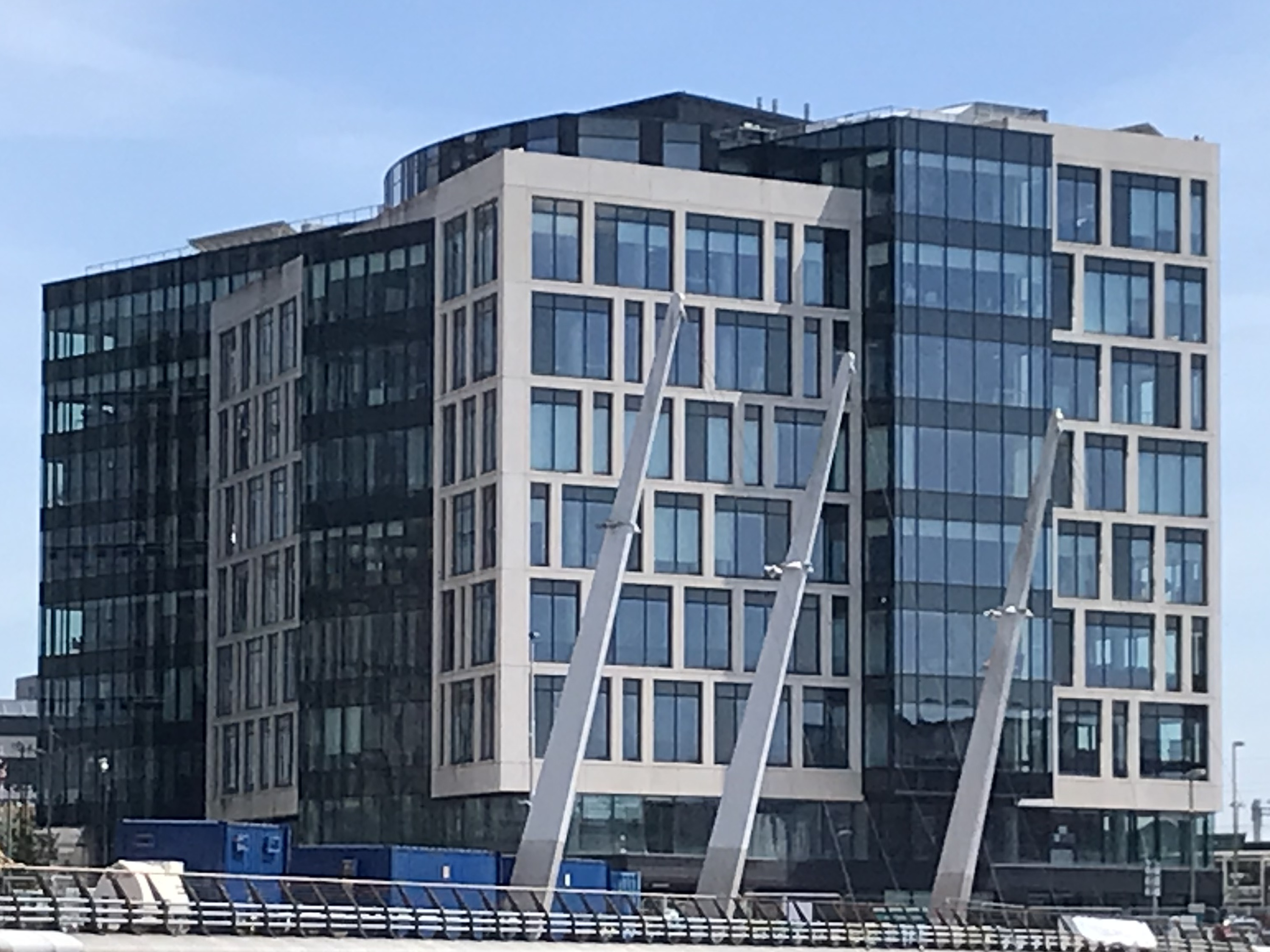
1 Central Square

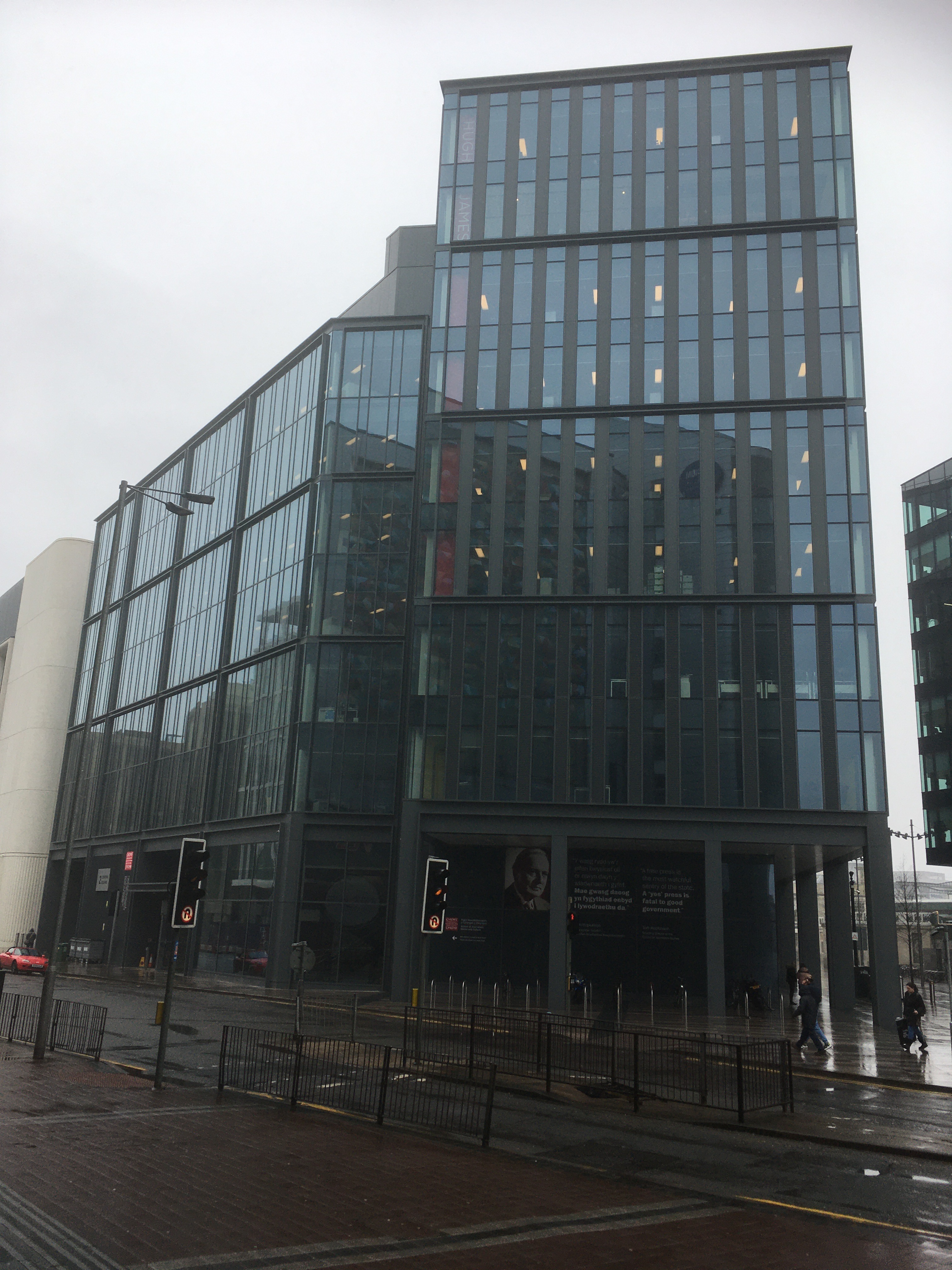
2 Central Square

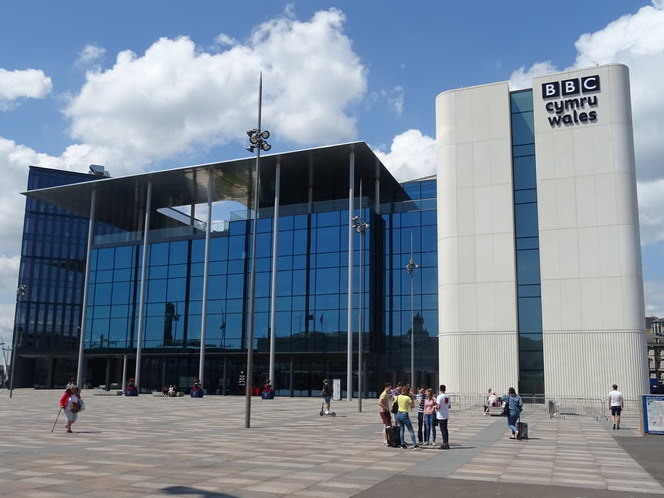
3 Central Square – New Broadcasting House

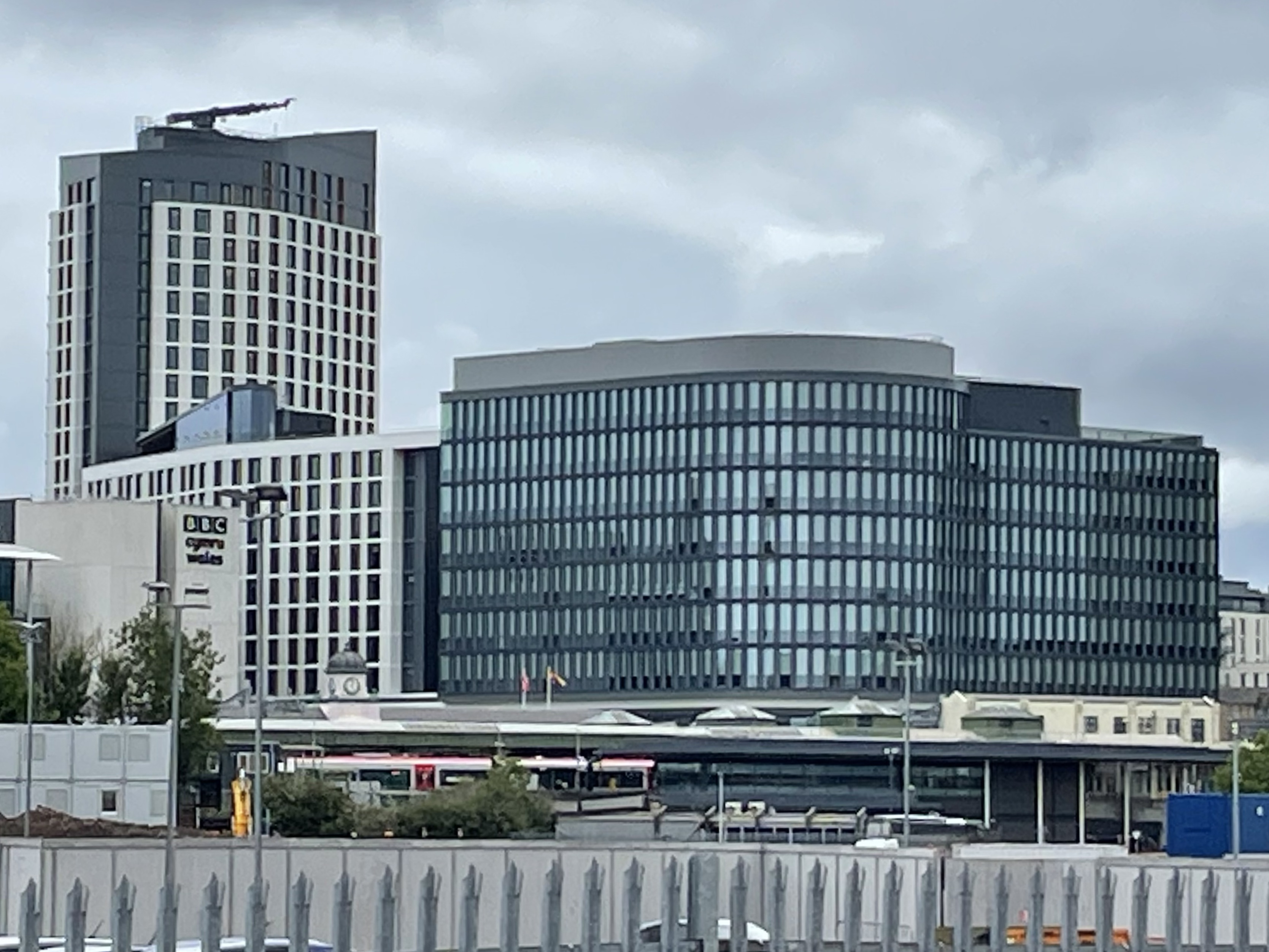
4 Central Square – Cardiff Bus Interchange during construction

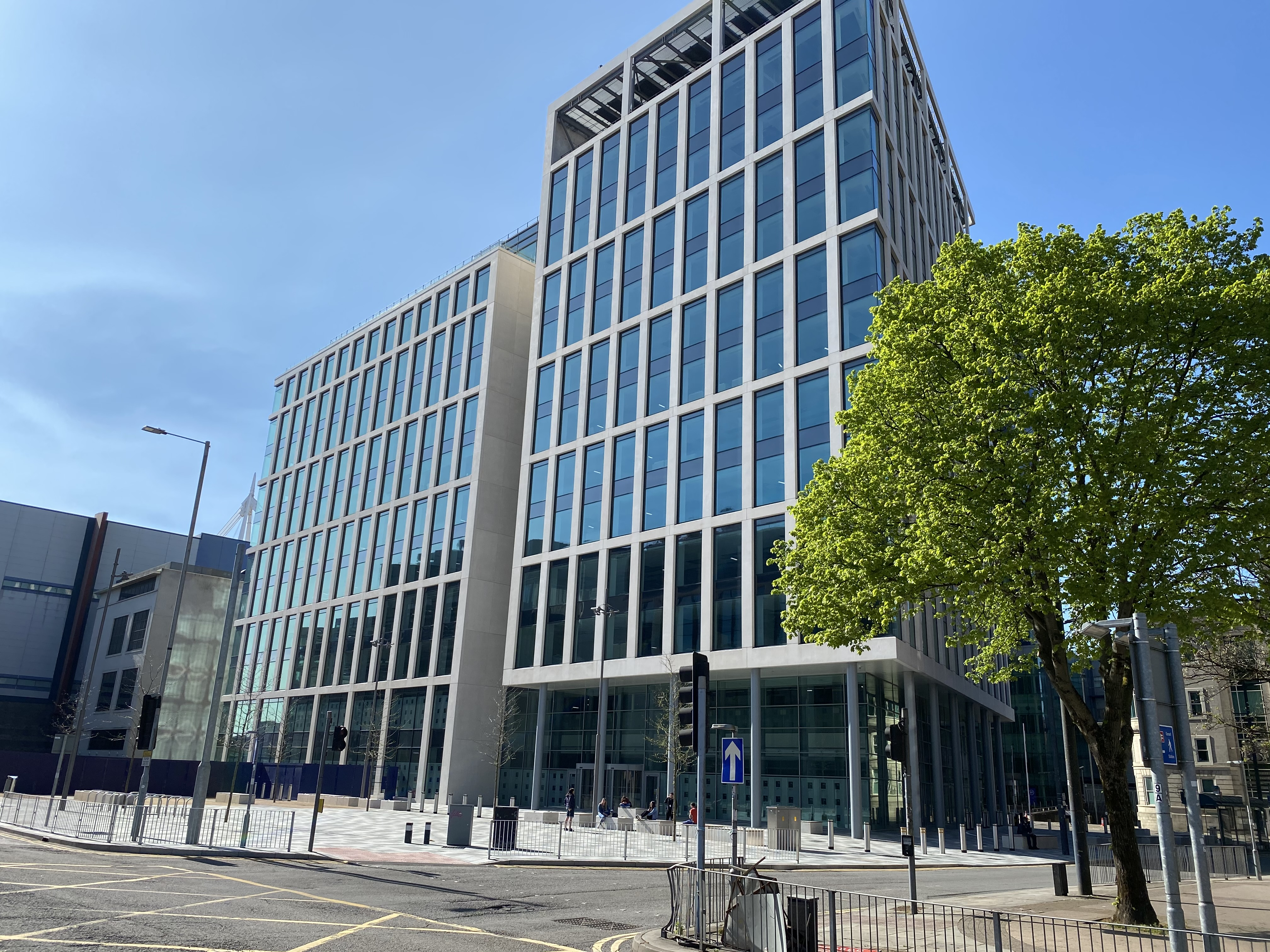
6 Central Square – William Morgan House

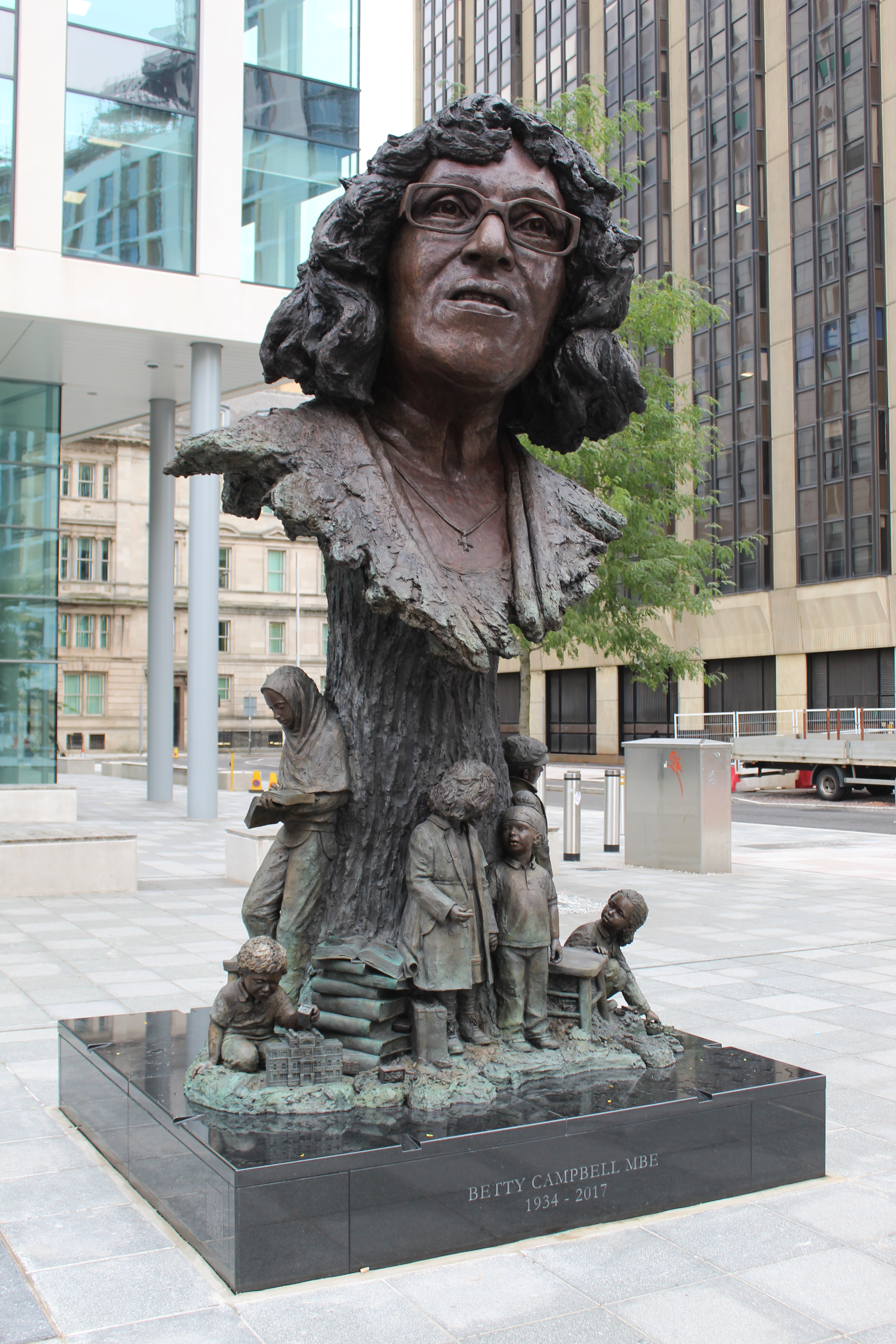
Statue of Betty Campbell
