= Cardiff Central station =

Cardiff Central station may refer to:

- Cardiff Central bus station
- Cardiff Central railway station
