= Polly Evans =

British former television presenter

- Education: University of Leeds / Cardiff University
- Occupation: Television presenter
- Notable credit: South East Today (2005-2019)

Polly Evans is a Welsh journalist, broadcaster, TV & Audio producer, and former anchor of the BBC regional news programme South East Today.

== Career ==
Evans started broadcasting while studying at the University of Leeds, working early morning shifts on the campus radio station. She then went to Cardiff Journalism School at Cardiff University to do a post-graduate diploma and later, travelled to post-war Bosnia to make a film about a new impartial television station for the country.

After working in Japan as an English teacher during a gap year, Evans joined BBC Radio Wales' features department, developing and producing networked programming for BBC Radio 4. She later joined the BBC Wales newsroom as a reporter and newsreader, before moving to BBC Radio Devon in Plymouth a year later. She then transferred to television as a reporter and presenter for Spotlight and The Politics Show in the South West.

Evans joined South East Today before the 2005 general election. In September 2009, she became a main presenter alongside Rob Smith, replacing Geoff Clark and Beverley Thompson. The show was named Best Nations and Regions news programme twice at the national Royal Television Society Awards while Evans and Rob Smith were the anchors. During this time she also worked for the BBC Newschannel and BBC 5 Live as a reporter and newsreader.

Aside from her broadcasting work, Evans presented the Learn Direct Achievement Awards, The EDF Energy Awards for Journalism and the FSB's Brexit debate. She has also been a guest presenter of Tunbridge Wells International Young Concert Artist competition and a guest judge for the Culture Awards.

In 2017, after her voice degraded, Evans transferred from presenting to producing South East Today, joining the programme's editorial staff, during which time she oversaw TV news coverage of the general election in the region. She also worked on attachment as Social Affairs Correspondent.

Evans left the BBC in Autumn 2019 to become Head of Communications & Digital for The Access Project, a charity which helps bright students from disadvantaged backgrounds gain access to top Universities. She later worked in children's audio production for Tonies.

She is a Trustee of the charity Care for the Carers.

== Personal life ==
Evans has a deaf sister and brother. She is married with two daughters.

In May 2023 she appeared on the BBC Radio 4 programme Life Changing and explained that her career change had been brought about by adductor spasmodic dysphonia. Vocal coaching and Botox therapy have somewhat restored her voice.
