= Cardiff Bus Interchange =

Bus station in Cardiff, Wales

Cardiff Bus Interchange (part of The Interchange complex)
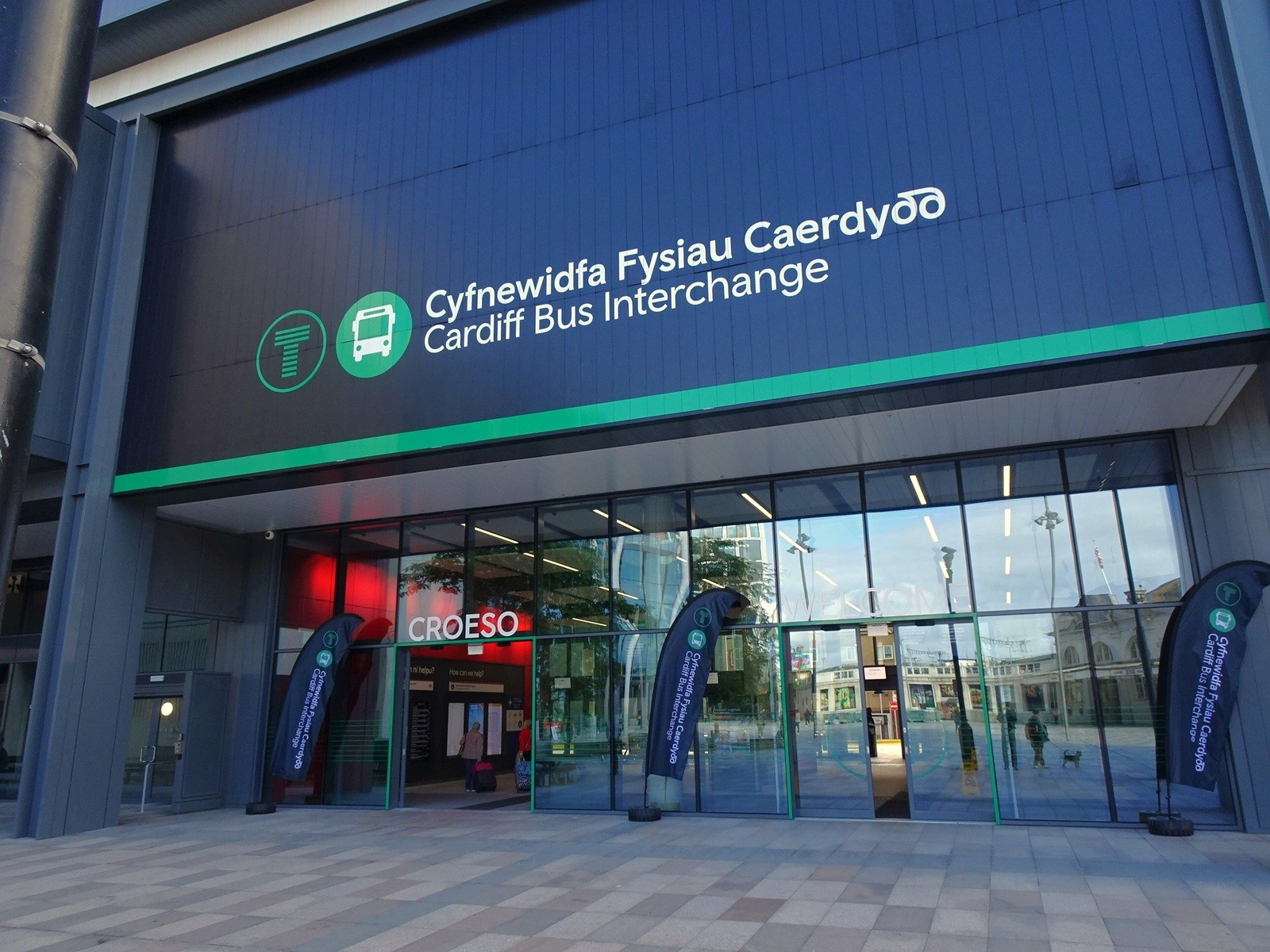
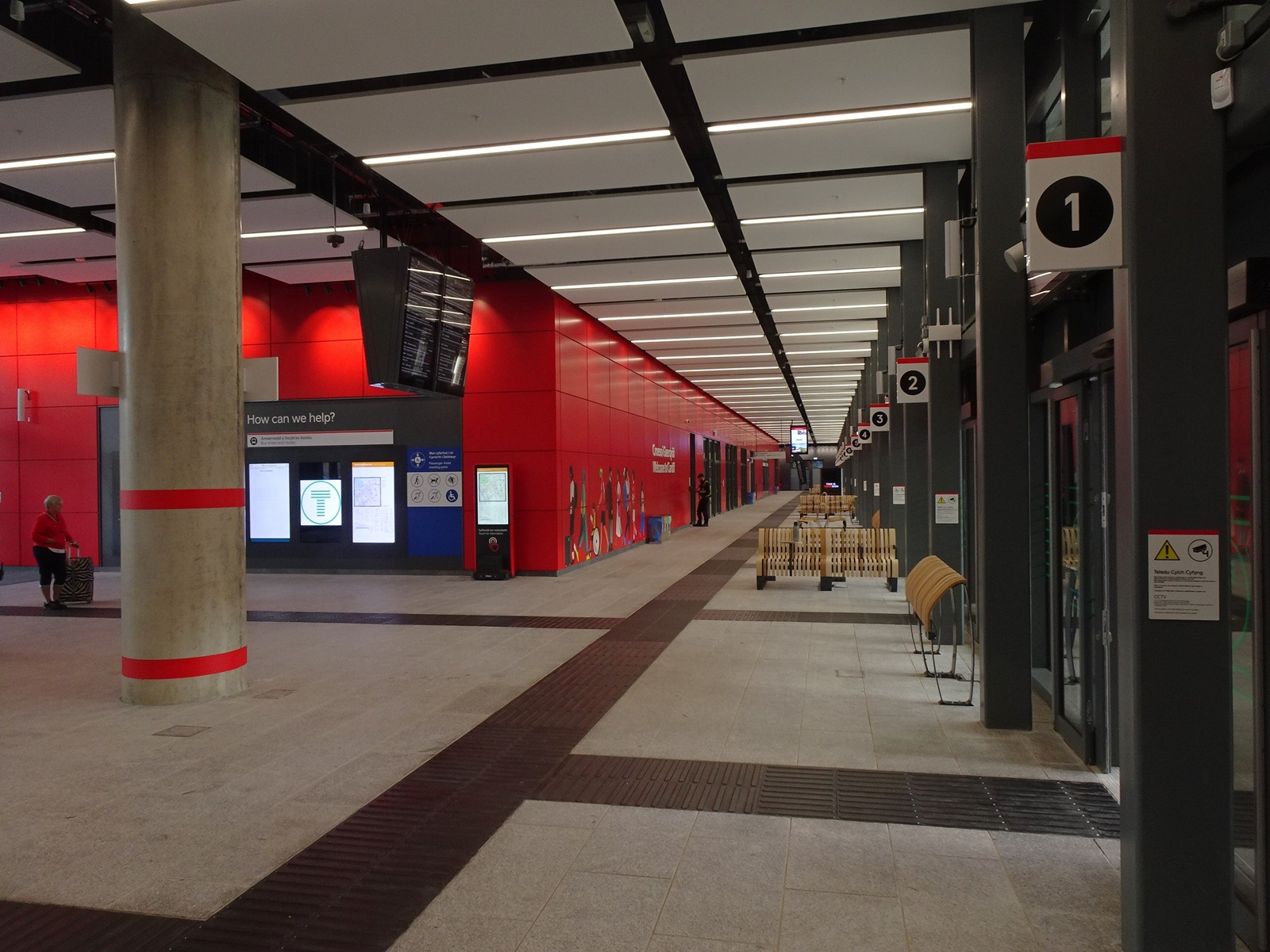
- The southern Bus Interchange entrance The Bus Interchange concourse

General information
- Location: 4 Central Square, Cardiff; Wales
- System: Bus station
- Owner: Welsh Government (site)
- Operator: Transport for Wales (bus station and bus apron only)
- Bus stands: 14
- Bus operators: Cardiff Bus; Newport Bus; Stagecoach South Wales; First Cymru
- Connections: Cardiff Central railway station

History
- Opened: 30 June 2024
Location

Cardiff Bus Interchange (CBI) (Welsh: Cyfnewidfa Fysiau Caerdydd; formerly Cardiff Transport Interchange, Welsh: Cyfnewidfa Drafnidiaeth Caerdydd; sometimes Cardiff Interchange or The Interchange) is a bus and transport interchange in the centre of Cardiff and forms part of The Interchange development, which also includes Wood Street House at the northern end with 318 for-rent apartments, two floors of office space, and four retail units on the ground floor.

It was under construction from 2020 and is operated by the Welsh Government's transport arm, Transport for Wales. The bus station is at the southern end of The Interchange with 14-bays for buses on the ground floor, whilst the Cardiff Bus Interchange officially opened on 30 June 2024, although the public could view the new facilities and services between 27–29 June 2024.

== Background ==
Construction of the Interchange's offices and bus station

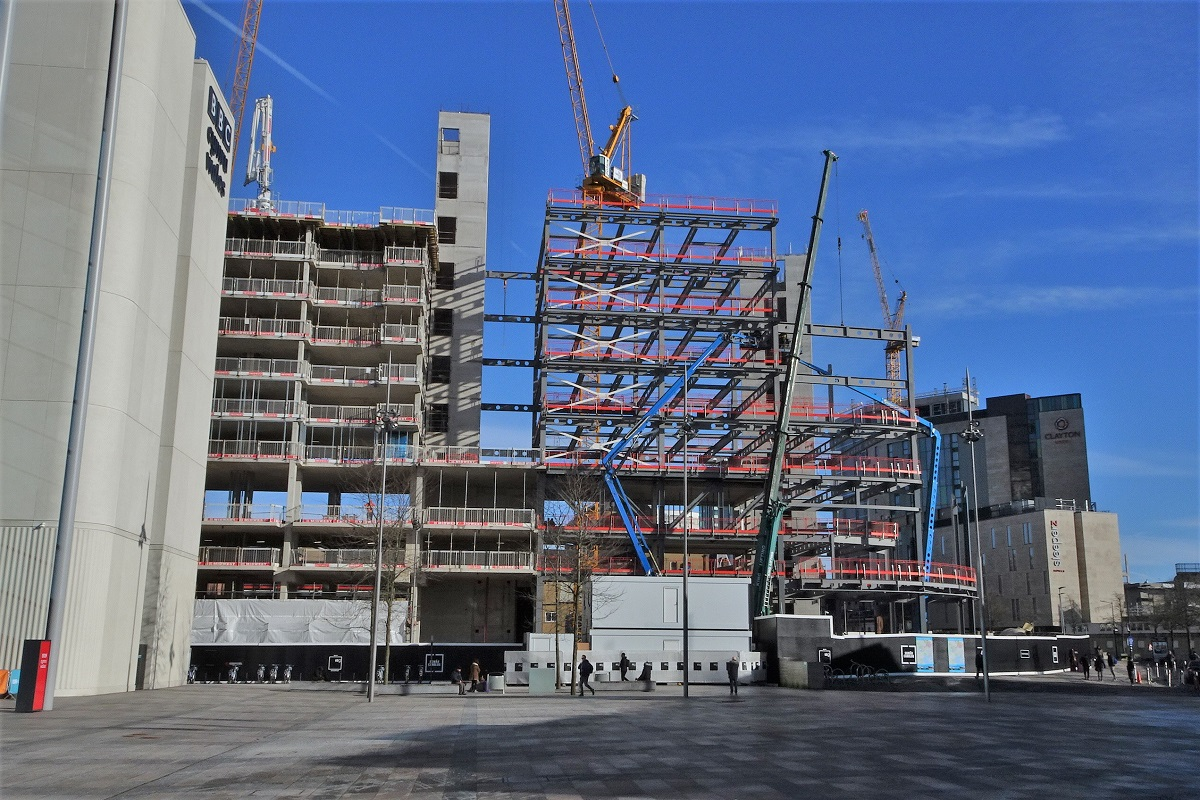
January 2021

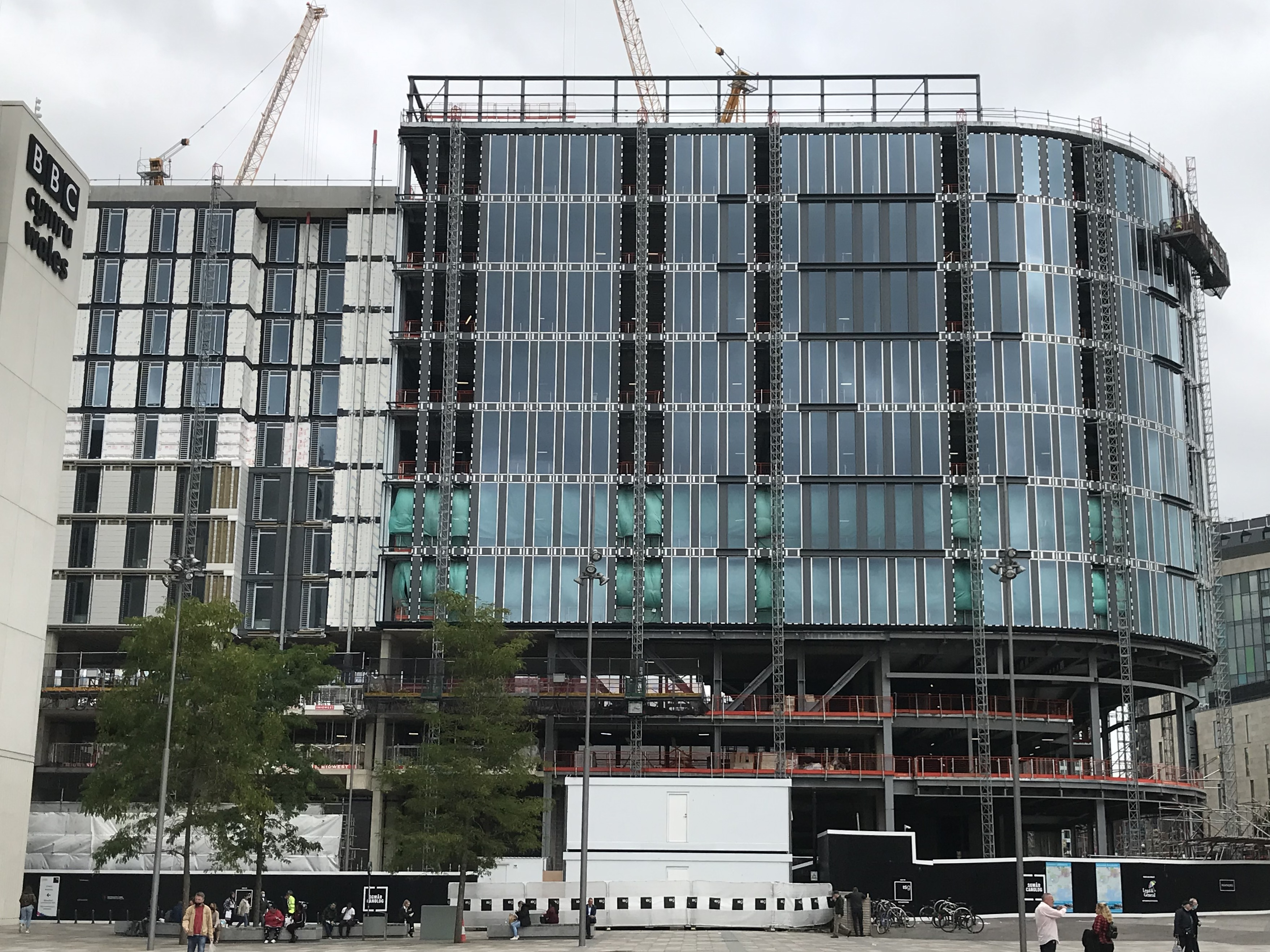
September 2021

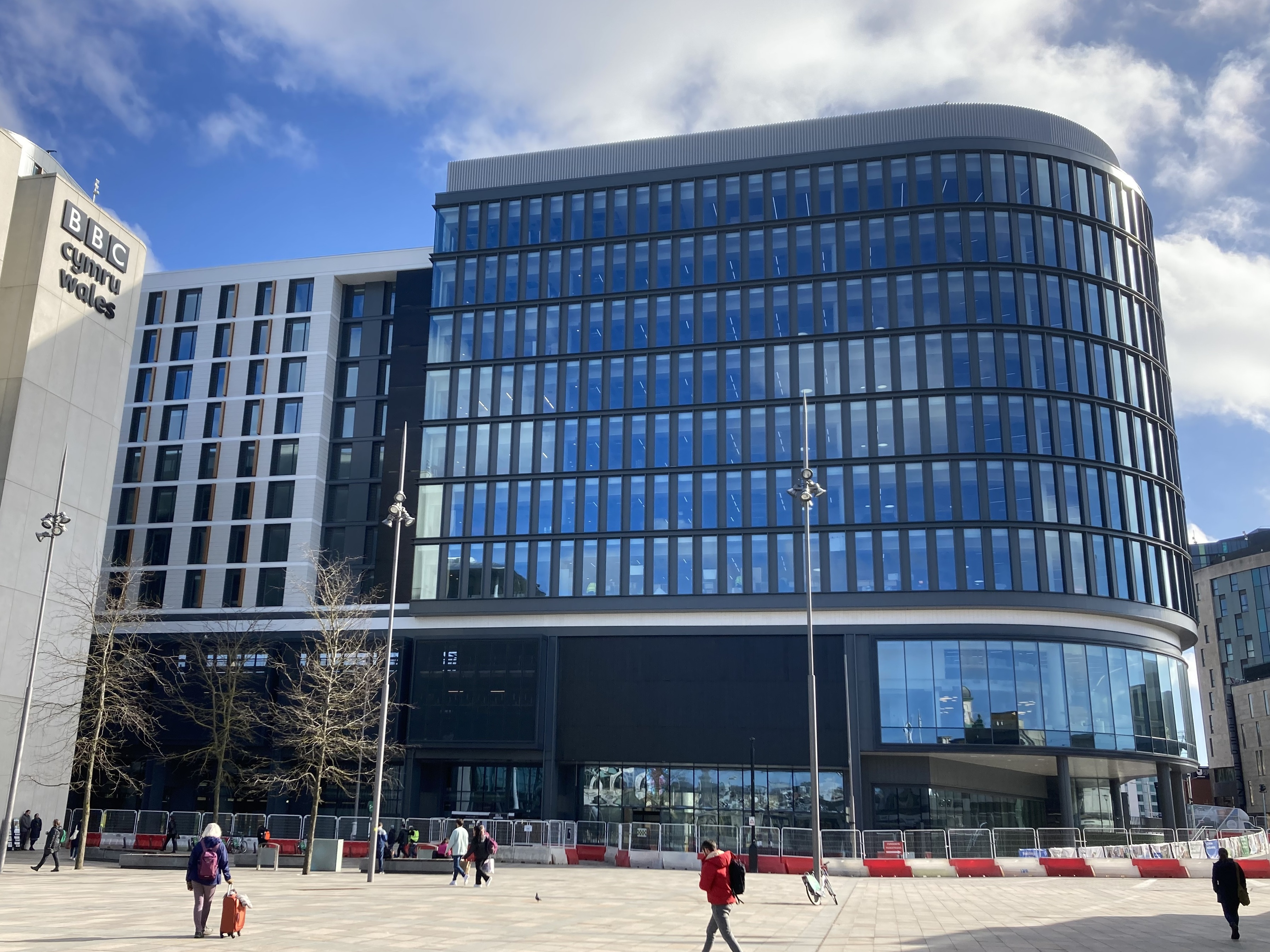
April 2023

Cardiff Central bus station had originally been built, directly to the north of what is now Cardiff Central railway station, in 1954. The old terminus building was demolished in 2008 and, in 2010, options were put to the public for a multi-million pound bus station redevelopment or replacement. In 2014 a "Capital Square" masterplan for Central Square (the former bus station site) was revealed, led by developers Rightacres Property, including a new headquarters building for BBC Cymru Wales. The old bus station finally closed in August 2015. A replacement was expected to be completed by 2017, designed by Foster and Partners, on the site of the nearby Marland House and Wood Street NCP multi-storey carpark. As well as a new bus station it also included offices, shops and a hotel.

In 2016 the Marland House office block and the neighbouring NCP Wood Street multi-storey car park were demolished. It was planned to site the 'Central Transport Interchange' on this site, with walkways linking it to the railway station.

Foster and Partners was dropped from the project in 2018, after the Welsh Government took over responsibility from Cardiff Council, though by this point the architecture firm had completely redesigned the proposals.

== Development ==
Demolished buildings to make way for the Interchange

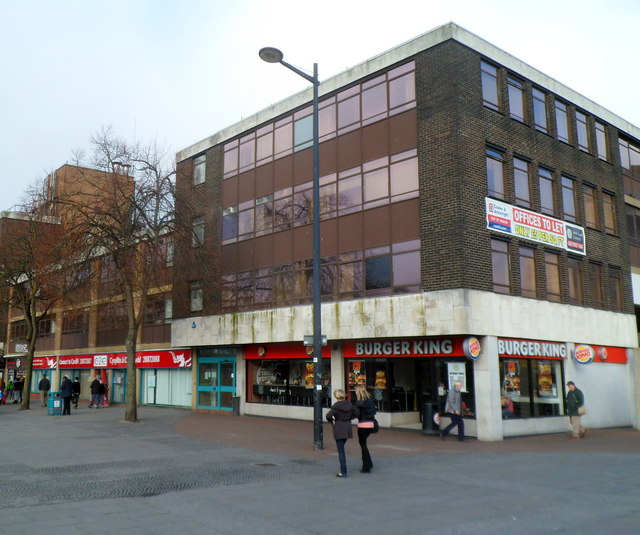
Marland House

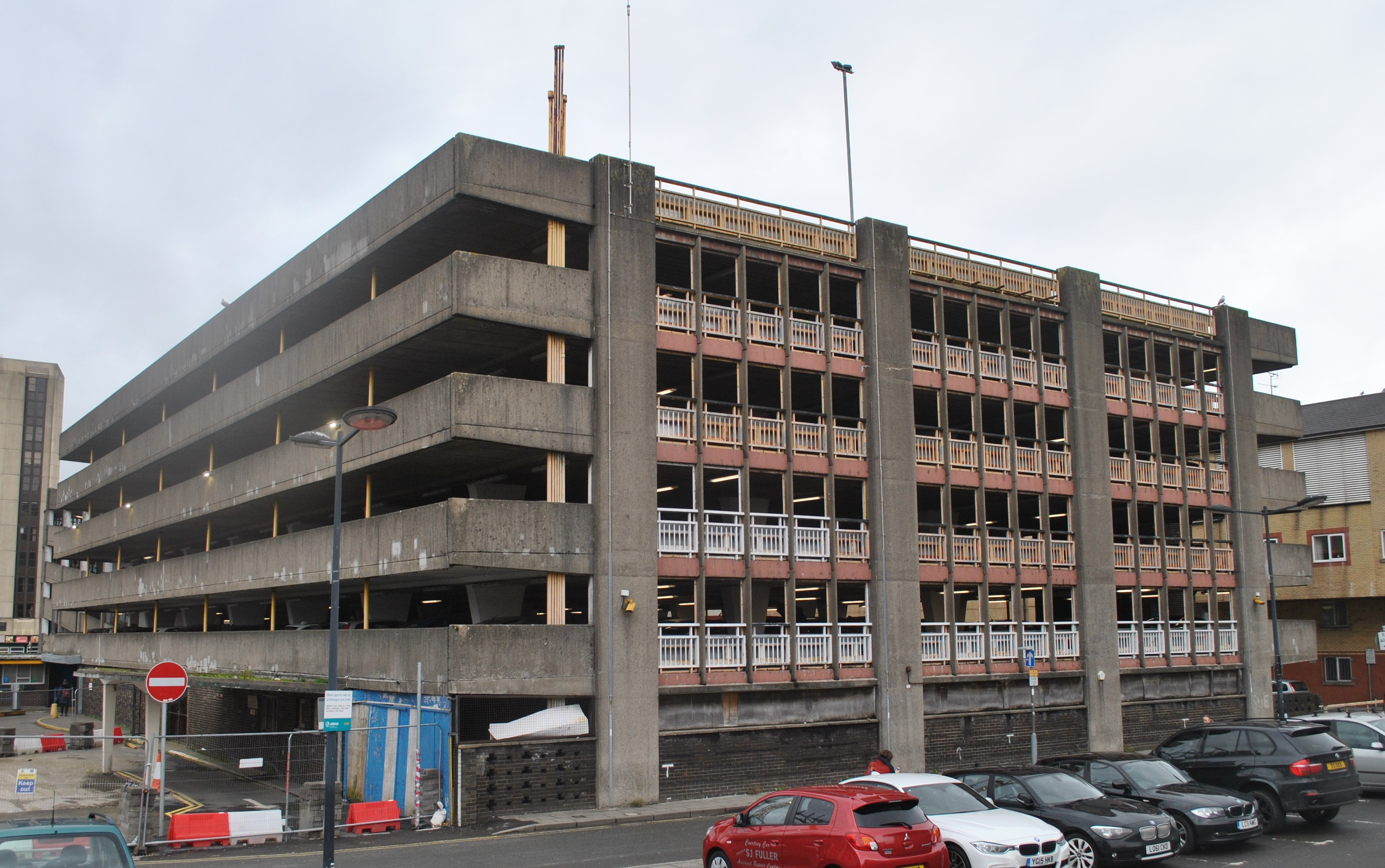
NCP Wood Street multi-storey car park

The Welsh Government bought the Marland House site from Cardiff Council for £12 million and carried out £3 million of preparatory work. In April 2018 the new design for the 'Metro Central Interchange' was revealed, designed by local architects Holder Mathias Architects based on concepts by Foster and Partners. The Interchange would include a 14-stand bus station with a covered concourse and 500 cycle spaces. Once completed, the Interchange would be run by the Welsh Government's not-for-profit subsidiary, Transport for Wales, intended to bring together an integrated transport system.

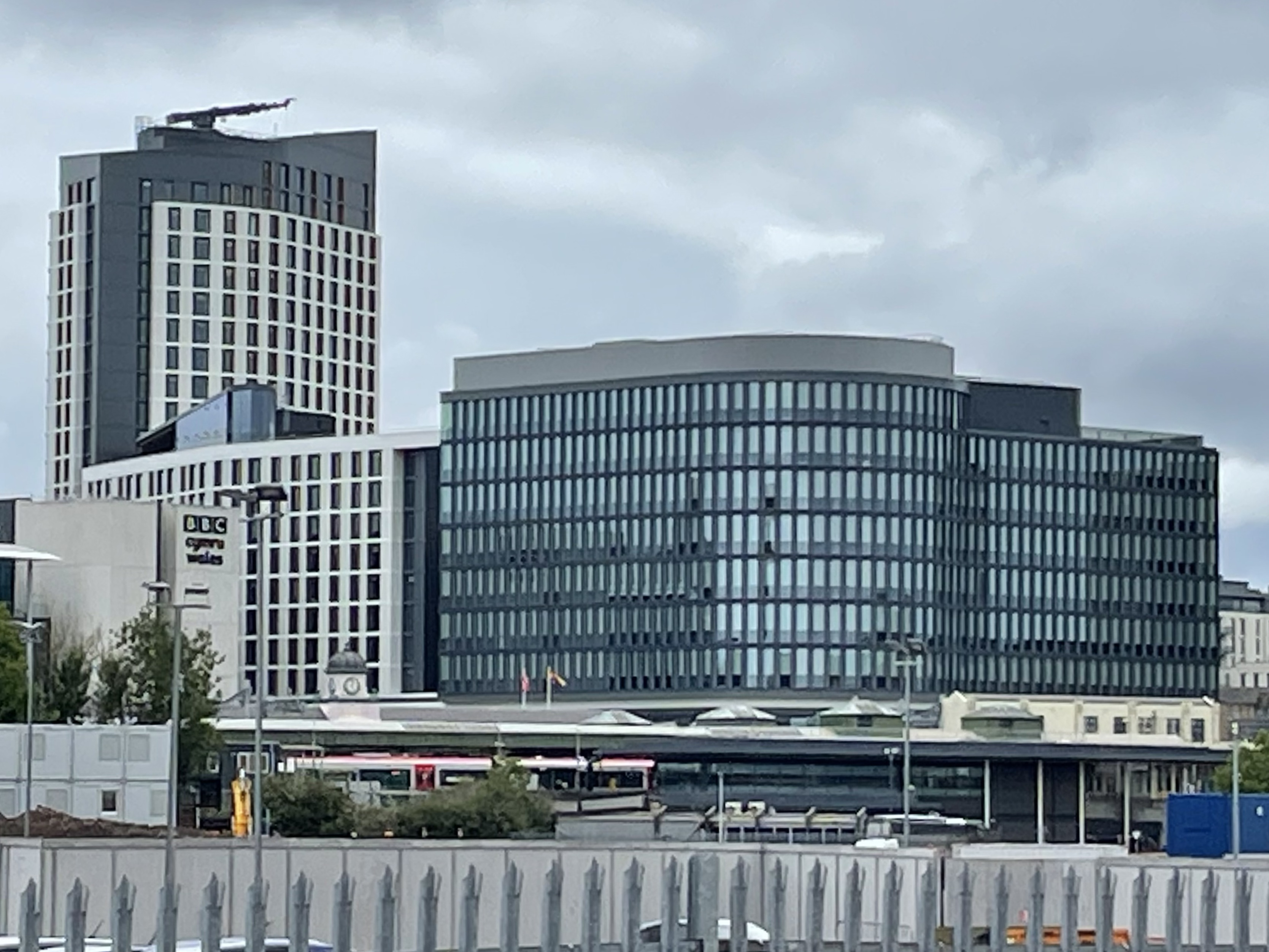
4 Central Square, includes Cardiff Bus Interchange on the ground floor with Legal & General offices above and Wood Street House residential tower block to the left.

In July 2019 it was announced that contracts had finally been signed between the Welsh Government, finance company Legal & General, and the developers Rightacres, to begin work constructing the scheme. Construction was expected to begin at the end of the year, after a major drain had been relocated.

Having previously built the adjacent BBC Cymru Wales New Broadcasting House and 2 Central Square, in December 2019 construction company ISG secured the £89 million contract to build the new Cardiff Bus Interchange. The Interchange is funded by Legal & General. As well as the covered 14-bay bus station, the Interchange includes 318 build to rent apartments, about 90,000 square feet (8,400 m^{2}) of office accommodation, and a retail unit.

In October 2020 Legal & General pledged £400 million of forward funding to build a new headquarters office building for its 2,000 staff, as part of the Interchange development.

Originally planned for completion in 2022, it was revealed in July 2023 that the bus station would be accessible by the end of the year, though not fully operational until 2024. The first scheduled bus service was due to operate from the interchange on the morning of Sunday 30 June 2024. Initially a peak of twenty-five services operate every hour from the interchange, with the ambition of reaching sixty per hour by the end of 2024. At the time of opening, tenants were being sought for the four retail units but had yet to be confirmed. Starbucks were the first business to open at the interchange in April 2025, followed by Kiwis Bowls, Which Wich? and Muffin Break, the latter of which opened in July 2026. In October 2026, a new venue in collaboration with Brains Brewery, Transport for Wales and pub company Breaking Brands was announced to bring a "Welsh brewing and food heritage experience" to the hub, complete with a large terrace.

== See also ==
- List of tallest buildings in Cardiff
