= Rob Smith (journalist) =

English television presenter

- Occupation: Television presenter
- Notable credit: South East Today (2009—2020)

Rob Smith is an English television presenter, who has been a co-anchor on the BBC South East Today news programme. Rob Smith and Polly Evans took over the co-anchor roles from Geoff Clark and Beverley Thompson in September 2009.

== Career ==
Smith joined the BBC in the South East in 1994.

He started his career on BBC Radio Kent. He was at the radio station for seven years, ending up producing and presenting the evening drivetime show.

Smith was a presenter and reporter with BBC South East Today since the programme started in 2001.

As a news journalist, Smith has covered a range of stories, from hard news, talking to victims of crime or circumstance, to the more amusing items, such as the man who kept a lizard in a bath.

In 2008, Smith sailed around Britain in his yacht Wild Rover - a Sadler 32, designed by David Sadler - a voyage of some 2,000 miles which raised over £15,000 for Leukaemia Research.

In 2012, he cycled at Brands Hatch for the 2012 Cyclothon.

In 2014, Smith was the compere of the Top Choir Competition on 12 April at the Shirley Hall in Canterbury.

Smith left the BBC in November 2020.

== Personal life ==
Smith lives in Kent and is married with two children.
