= Cardiff School of Journalism, Media and Culture =

School at Cardiff University

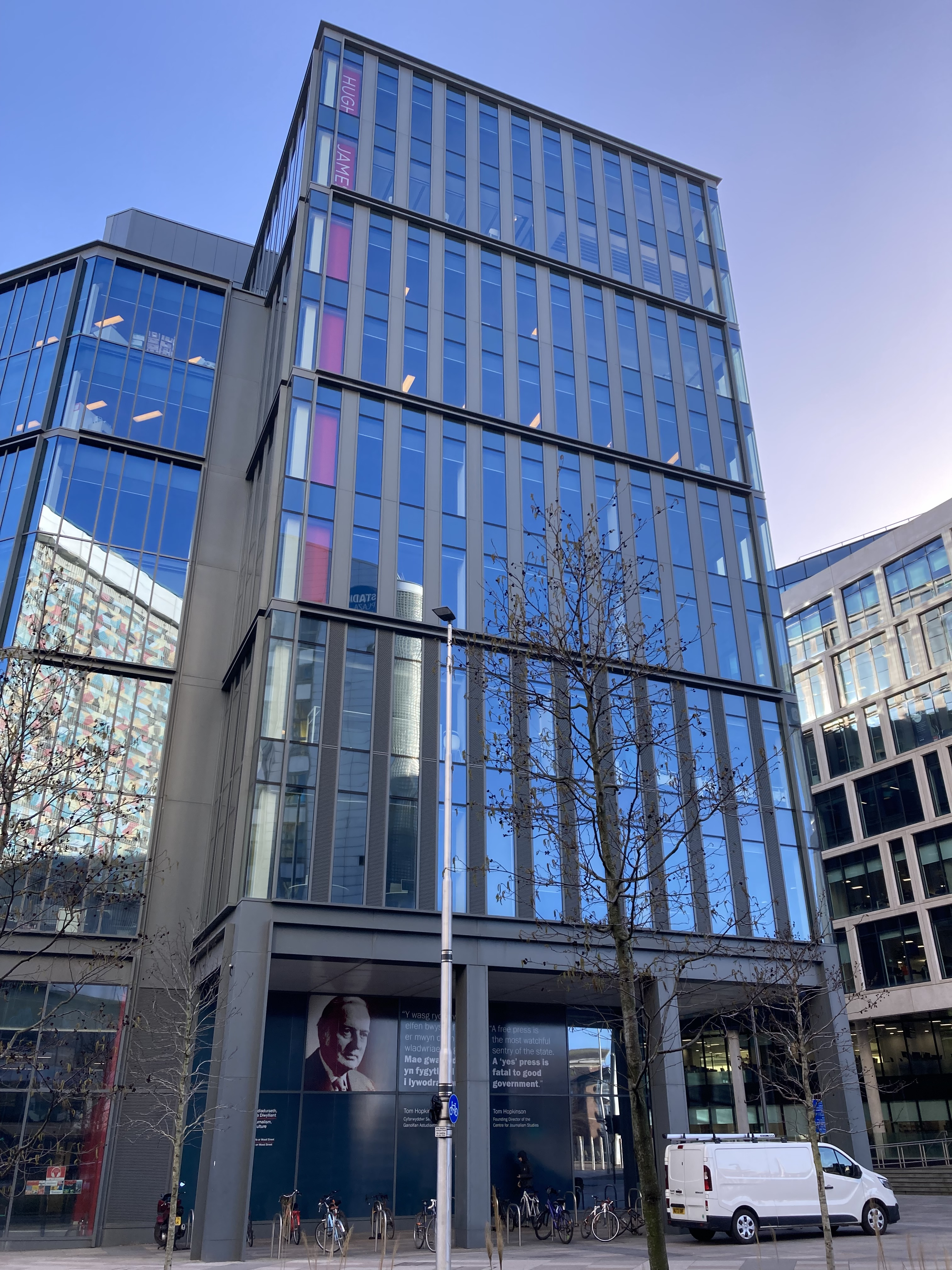
- 2 Central Square
- Cardiff, UK

Information
- Established: 1970
- Head: Dr Matt Walsh
- Faculty: 40+
- Enrollment: Total, 550 (approximate); 350 undergraduate 200 postgraduate
- Website: cardiff.ac.uk/jomec jomec.co.uk/blog

The Cardiff School of Journalism, Media and Culture (JOMEC) (Welsh: Ysgol Newyddiaduriaeth, y Cyfryngau ac Astudiaethau Diwylliannol, Caerdydd) is Cardiff University's school for training in media. It is one of the journalism schools whose main universities are part of the Russell Group. It was founded as the Cardiff Journalism School in 1970 by Sir Tom Hopkinson and is the longest established postgraduate centre of journalism education in Europe. The school is considered one of the best training centres for journalists and is often described as the "Oxbridge of journalism".

The school is based in a state-of-the-art building in Central Square, having moved from Cathays Park in September 2018. The head of the school is Dr Matt Walsh, and the former director of the Centre of Journalism Studies was Professor Richard Sambrook, former director of BBC World Service and Global News.

The school is also home to Cardiff University's Centre for Community Journalism (C4CJ) which developed the world's first Massive Open Online Course (MOOC) on community journalism. The centre now also oversees the Independent Community News Network (ICNN), the UK's only representative body for community and hyperlocal publishers.

== Move to Central Square ==
The school was formerly housed in the Bute Building of the university's Cathays Park campus. In September 2018 it moved to 2 Central Square, north of Cardiff Central railway station and adjacent to New Broadcasting House, the headquarters of BBC Cymru Wales. The school occupies 42,000 sq ft (3,900 m^{2}) in the building. The layout and interior were designed by IBI architects and include a 300-seat lecture theatre, six newsrooms, editing suites, and state-of-the-art TV and radio studios.

== Degree programmes ==
- Bachelor of Arts
- Master of Arts
- Postgraduate Diploma in Journalism
- PhD & MPhil
- MBA Media Management
- MSc Computational and Data Journalism
- MA International Public Relations and Global Communications Management

== Honorary members and visiting fellows ==
- Carl Bernstein, American journalist known for his investigation of the Watergate scandal
- Alan Rusbridger, former editor-in-chief of The Guardian

== See also ==
- List of tallest buildings in Cardiff
