= Nina Ridge =

British weather forecaster on the BBC

Nina Ridge is a British weather forecaster on the BBC.

== BBC ==
Ridge joined the BBC Weather Centre in December 2001, after seeing a job advert in The Guardian. Ridge has also appeared on Stargazing Live. She presented forecasts for national TV on BBC One until August 2015. She took to the skies with The Blades a Eastbourne Airbourne. Ridge regularly presents weather forecasts for BBC South East Today.

Ridge is a veteran athlete who regularly runs competitively with Tonbridge Athletic Club. Her husband received a CBE for his work in the Hurricane Relief Operation.
