= Kaye Forster =

British weather presenter

Kaye Forster (born c. 1980) is a freelance weather presenter based at BBC East Midlands weather hub. Her usual role is providing weekday breakfast and lunchtime and weekend forecasts for the East Midlands, West Midlands and North West regions following budget cuts as part of the BBC's Delivering Quality First in England program.

Forster took a BSc in Geography at Brunel University where her final year dissertation was on the effect of global warming on Atlantic hurricanes. In 2001 she started Met. Office training at 'several RAF airfields'. She became a regular weather presenter at BBC South East Today before leaving to become freelance; she then spent a spell covering for a leave of absence for Dianne Oxberry at BBC North West Tonight.

Forster joined a ladies' football team at university and has since played for Wycombe Wanderers, Exeter City and Ebbsfleet United.
