= BBC South East Today =

BBC television news programme for the South East of England

- Title card used since April 2022

Production
- Producers: BBC News; BBC South East
- Production locations: Great Hall Studios, Royal Tunbridge Wells
- Running time: 30 minutes (main 6:30 pm programme); 10 minutes (1:30 pm and 10:30 pm programmes); Various (during weekends and Breakfast)

Original release
- Network: BBC One South East
- Release: 3 September 2001 – present

Related
- BBC South Today; ITV News Meridian; ITV News London

BBC South East Today is the BBC South East regional television news programme, serving Kent, East Sussex, part of West Sussex and a small part of Surrey. Prior to its launch on 3 September 2001, most of the viewers in the region received Newsroom South East, though some had been receiving South Today.

South East Today is produced and broadcast live from the BBC's South East Regional Production Centre in Royal Tunbridge Wells with district reporters covering Brighton, Canterbury, Chatham, Dover and Hastings.

== Overview ==
Launched with a sole main presenter Laurie Mayer, the programme was briefly the centre of a minor BBC scandal, after Mayer resigned amid accusations of management bullying.

The show then became double-headed, with Beverley Thompson (formerly the programme's health correspondent) and Giles Dilnot presenting. In 2004, Geoff Clark joined the programme. Clark and Thompson presented the programme together for five years until their departure in September 2009. Long-serving weather presenter Kaddy Lee-Preston, who had been with South East Today since its launch left the programme in March 2012.

As of 2026 the main presenter is Natalie Graham with weather presenters Nina Ridge and Sara Thornton.

The main transmitters that carry the regional news are Heathfield, Bluebell Hill and Dover, with associated relays including Hastings, Tunbridge Wells and Whitehawk Hill. As of March 2012 (following digital switchover), the Whitehawk Hill relay transmitter (which serves the Brighton and Hove area) now carries BBC South East output instead of BBC South, and the region extends as far west as Worthing.

== Presenters ==
=== News ===
- Ellie Crisell (newsreader)
- Natalie Graham

=== Weather ===
- Nina Ridge

== Former presenters ==
- Christopher Blanchett (Reporting Scotland)
- Giles Dilnot (Daily Politics)
- Polly Evans
- Michael Fish
- Kaye Forster
- Nazaneen Ghaffar (Sky News)
- Tomasz Schafernaker (BBC Weather)
- Rob Smith (journalist)
- Caroline Feraday

== See also ==
- BBC News
