= Cardiff Central bus station =

Former bus terminal in Wales

Cardiff Central bus station Gorsaf Fysiau Canol Caerdydd
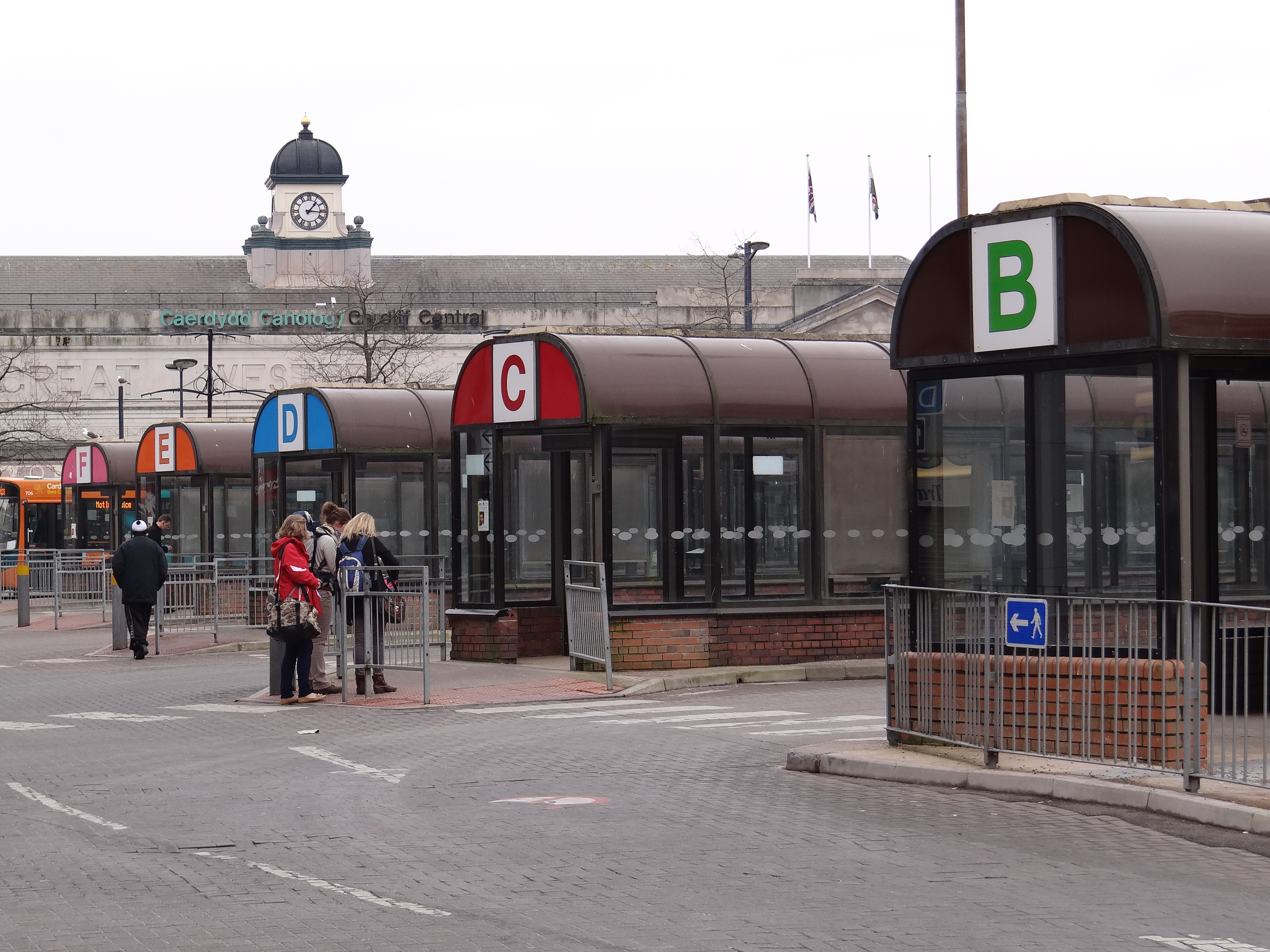
- Cardiff Central bus station in March 2013

General information
- Location: Cardiff Central Bus Station; Central Square; Cardiff; CF10 1EP; Wales
- Coordinates: 51.47643°N 3.17905°W
- Owner: City of Cardiff Council
- Bus stands: 34
- Bus operators: Cardiff Bus; Eurolines; First Cymru; NAT Group; National Express; Newport Bus; Stagecoach South Wales
- Connections: Cardiff Central railway station

History
- Opened: 1954
- Closed: 1 August 2015
- Rebuilt: 2020–2024 (as Cardiff Bus Interchange)
Location

Cardiff Central bus station was the main bus transport interchange in the Cardiff city centre until it closed on 1 August 2015. With 34 stands, it was the largest bus station in Wales. It was located adjacent to Cardiff Central railway station forming a major interchange. Construction of a new bus and transport interchange on the site of the former NCP multi-storey car park in Wood Street, adjacent to the old bus station, began in 2020 and was completed in spring 2024.

The station used to handle the vast majority of bus and coach services that run in and through the city. Notable exceptions were Megabus services (which called at Kingsway and Cardiff University), Stagecoach South Wales route 122 (which called at Greyfriars Road) and EST route 89 (which used Customhouse Street).

== History ==
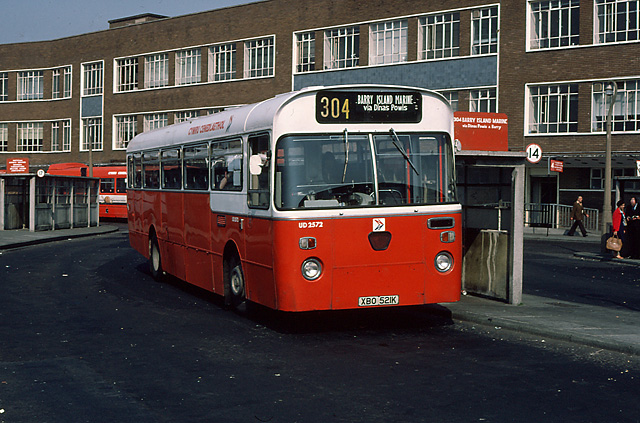
The bus station in June 1980

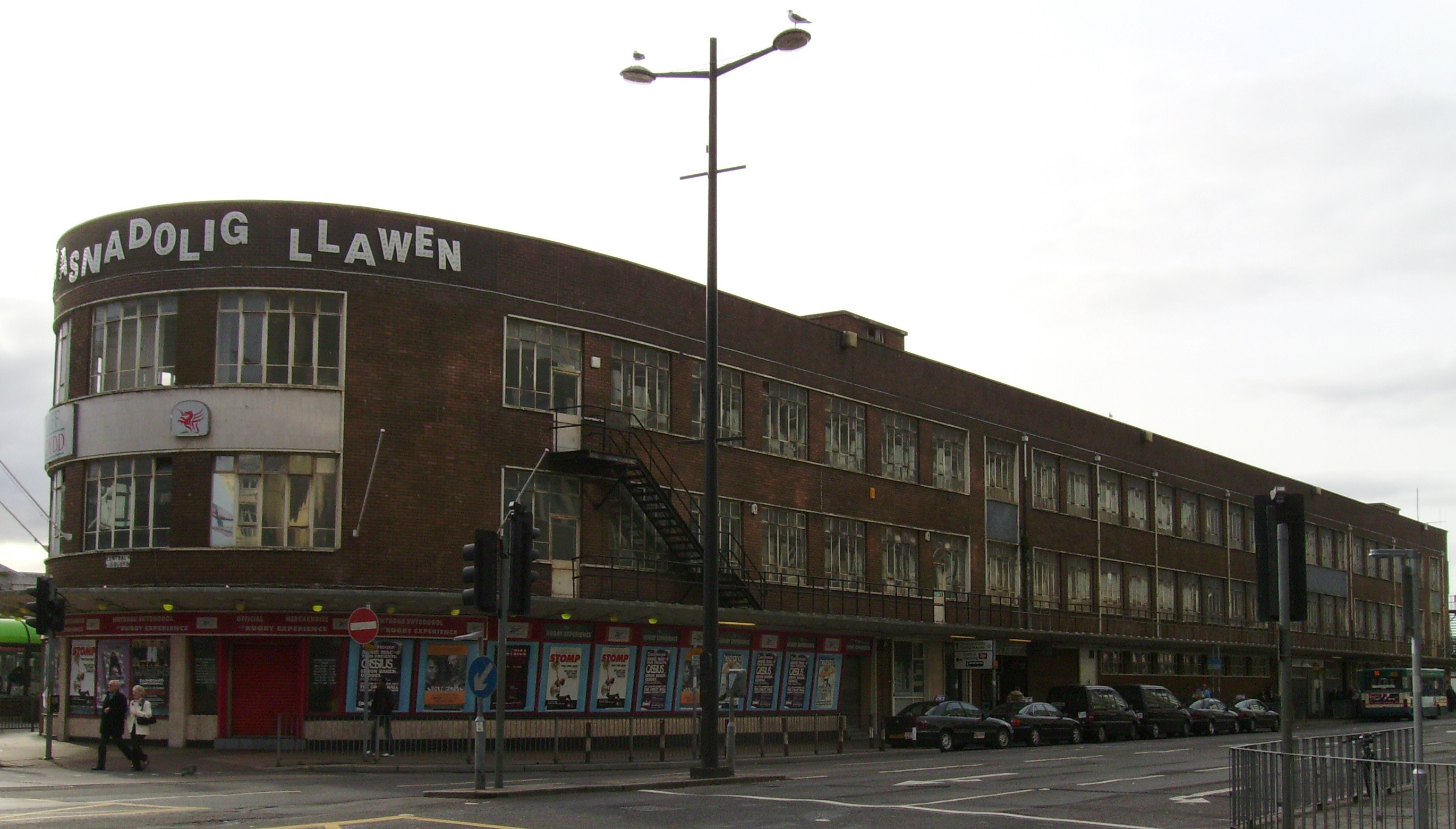
The terminal building from Wood Street in November 2007

The site of Cardiff's bus station had previously been an area of housing and shops known as Temperance Town. However, demolition of Temperance Town commenced in 1937 after the Great Western Railway persuaded the Cardiff Corporation to improve the view from their new railway station. The Central bus station opened in 1954.

Demolition of the bus station began in 2008 with the terminus building being demolished. Before work began, there were eight concourses lettered A-F and W with each concourse having numbered stands.

== Redevelopment ==
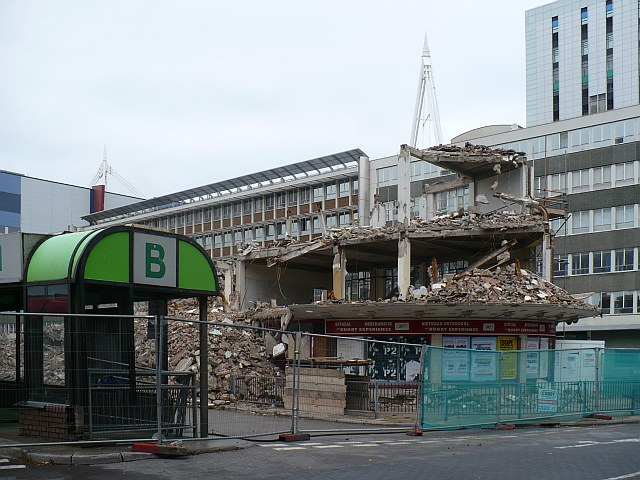
Final stages of demolition of the terminal building in August 2008

Redevelopment of the bus station began in 2008. Demolition of the old terminal buildings (between stand A and Wood Street stands) started on 11 January 2008, with buses instead picking up at Castle Street and Westgate Street. On 6 May 2008, Stand A at the bus station closed for demolition of the terminal buildings. As of 4 January 2009, some services reverted to using the bus station, whilst others remained split between the alternative terminal points.

A multimillion-pound modernisation of Cardiff central bus station was announced in December 2010, with three options for public consultation. In December 2011 the council announced that the existing bus station would close in early 2013 and the new bus station would be built on the site of the neighbouring Wood Street Car Park. The new bus station would open in mid-2014, and provide 19 bays and have direct access to Westgate Street and St Mary Street via Saunders Road. A further announcement was made in January 2012, that negotiations were underway to sell off the existing bus station land to two major companies, who would build a 12-storey headquarters on the site. Part of the proceeds from the sale would be put towards redesign and redevelopment of Central Square, which would be renamed Capital Square. These plans were put in doubt after the May 2012 council election.

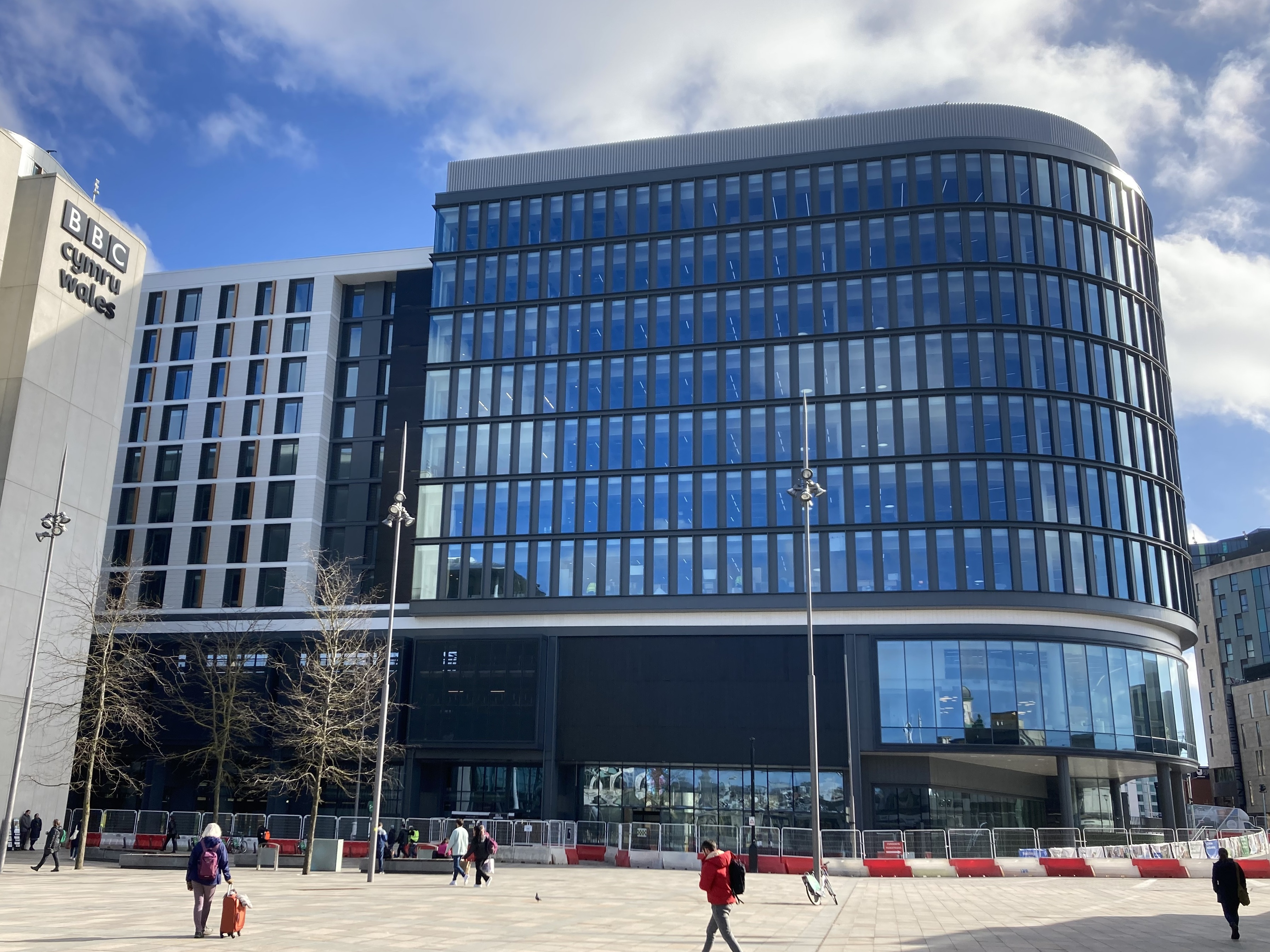
The new offices and entrance to the bus station under construction in April 2023

In October 2014 a new masterplan was revealed for the area, produced by architects Foster + Partners. BBC Cymru Wales earmarked the bus station as the site for its new headquarters. Proposals for a replacement bus station were to be put to the Cardiff Council later in 2014. In June 2015 Foster + Partners were chosen as the preferred architects and images were revealed of the new bus station, which would be completed by mid-2018. The final part of the bus station closed on 1 August 2015. Construction of the new Cardiff Central bus station began early in 2018, after an agreement was made between Rightacres, the developer of the site, and the Welsh Government. The plans, which were approved by Cardiff Council's cabinet on 20 December 2017, include both offices and residential apartments built along with the bus station. The new bus station was described as due to open in 2020.

In July 2019, contracts were signed with developer Rightacres and funder Legal & General to re-open a bus station on the new site. Several delays pushed completion of the Cardiff Bus Interchange to the spring of 2024. Scheduled bus services at the new interchange began on 30 June 2024.

== Facilities ==
Eating and drinking facilities such as a Burger King, as well as other shops and bus company offices, faced the stands on Central Square. Taxi ranks were located on both sides of the station.

Astey's Cafe, ticket offices, toilets and a newsagent were located at stand A which was demolished in mid-2008 as part of the redevelopment of the station. However, these services are available in the adjacent Cardiff Central railway station.

== Services ==
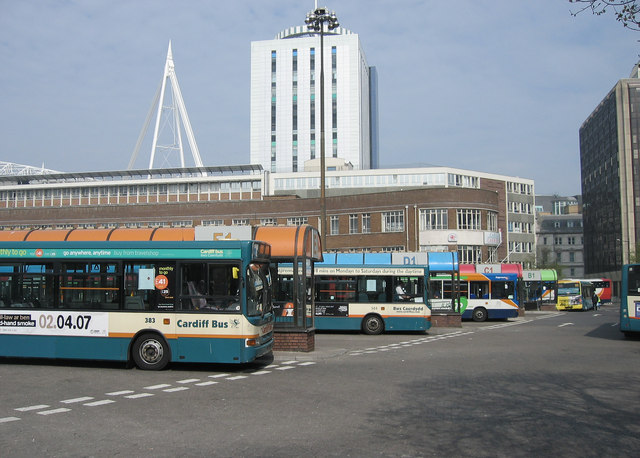
Cardiff Bus and Stagecoach South Wales buses at the bus station in April 2007

There were 34 stands at the station, which were located on Central Square, off Wood Street and opposite the Millennium Stadium, in the Cardiff city centre. The operating schedule was:

- Cardiff Bus operated services to Cardiff's districts and suburbs, cross-city services and services to Cardiff Bay, Barry, Llandough, Cogan, Penarth, Dinas Powys, Llantwit Major and Cardiff Airport
- Stagecoach South Wales provided services to Caerphilly, Blackwood, Senghenydd, Pontypool, Merthyr Tydfil, Cwmbran, Abergavenny and Hereford
- Newport Bus provided two services to Newport, one a direct route via the M4 and one via Risca
- EST Buses provided services to the Vale of Glamorgan
- First Cymru provided services to Swansea, Porthcawl, Cowbridge and Bridgend
- National Express provided services to Swansea, Bristol, Heathrow Airport, Gatwick Airport, London, Birmingham and Northern England
- Eurolines began a new service to Cork, Ireland in October 2011, via the Pembroke to Rosslare ferry

== See also ==
- List of bus stations in Wales
