= Peter Dilnot =

Australian rules footballer

Personal information
- Full name: Peter Dilnot
- Born: 6 November 1952 (age 73)
- Height: 178 cm (5 ft 10 in)
- Weight: 71 kg (157 lb)

Playing career^{1}
Years	Club	Games (Goals)
1972–73	Melbourne	5 (3)
- ^{1} Playing statistics correct to the end of 1973.

Peter Dilnot (born 6 November 1952) is a former Australian rules footballer who played with Melbourne in the Victorian Football League (VFL).
