= OYBike =

Bicycle sharing scheme in the UK

Overview
- Locale: Cardiff, Reading and Farnborough, United Kingdom
- Transit type: Bicycle sharing system

Operation
- Began operation: 2004

OYBike was a bicycle sharing scheme in west London, Reading, Farnborough and Cardiff in the United Kingdom. The Cardiff scheme ended 23 December 2011 with OYBike citing a lack of ongoing sponsorship.

The program is similar to, but not exactly the same as, other programs in different cities. The OYBike system was developed by former cabbie Bernie Hanning over the last 20 years but officially launched as a trial in 2004. Hanning sees these bikes as one aspect of a larger public transport network. Trials began in Hammersmith and Fulham in West London where the scheme was put in place at tube stations and theatres with the support of the local council. The relative ease with which an OYBike hire station can be erected has been cited as potential for growth in the city of London, however the scheme has now been superseded by Barclays Cycle Hire.

Users pay an initial fee and are then charged based on usage. The account is topped back up once usage reduces the balance. A mobile phone can be used to receive the code needed to unlock a bike for immediate use. The bike can be returned to any OYBike station.
