= Cader Idris (sculpture) =

Sculpture in Cardiff

Coordinates: 51°27′34″N 3°10′20″W

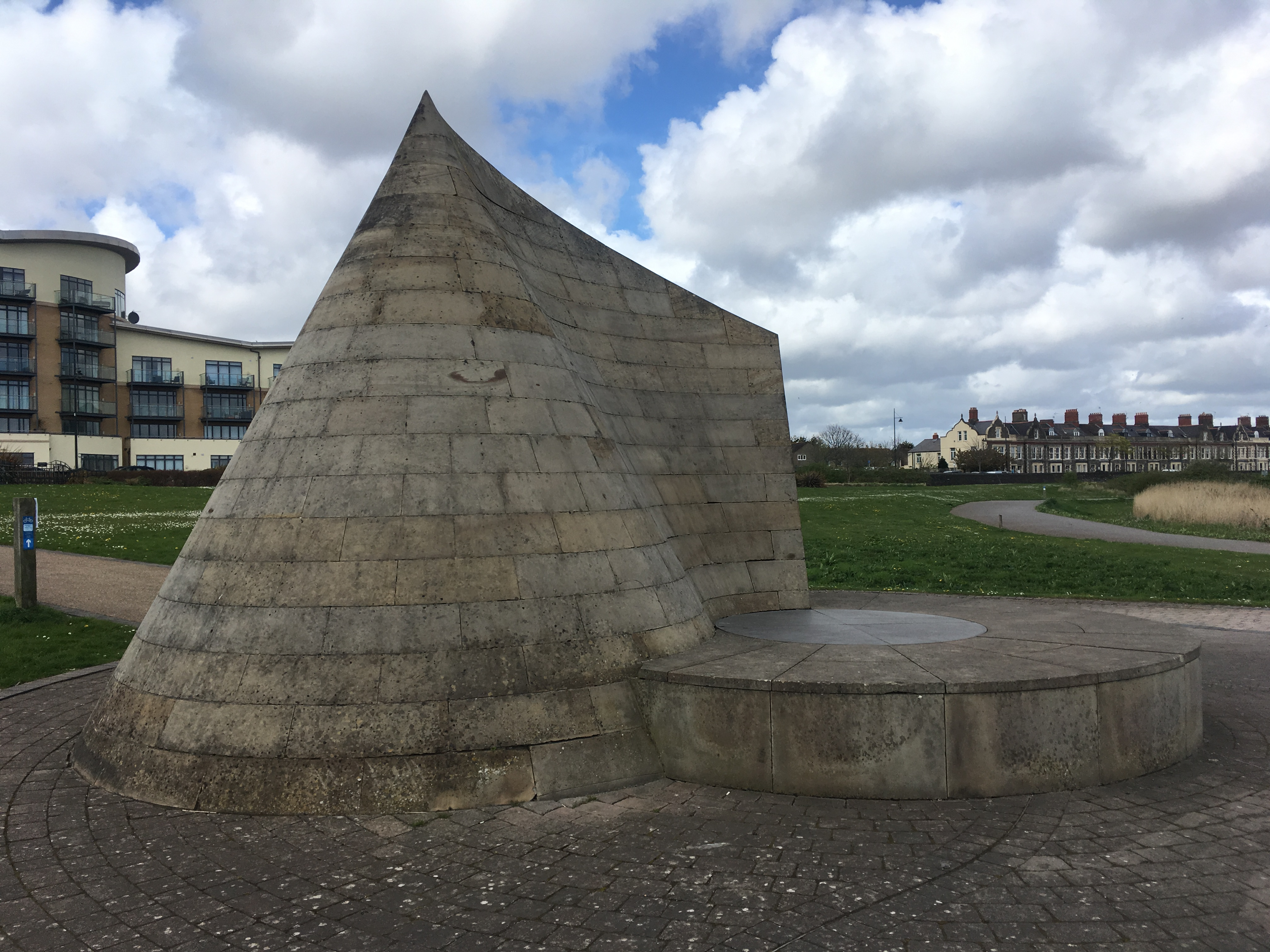
- Artist: William Pye
- Year: 1999
- Type: Sandstone
- Location: Cardiff United Kingdom

Cader Idris is a 1999 sculpture by William Pye on Windsor Esplanade in Cardiff, Wales.

It was sculpted by Pye between 1997 and 1999 from woodkirk sandstone, Welsh blue pennant slate and bronze. It is a sculptural representation of the mountain of the same name in the Meirionnydd area of Gwynedd.

The sculpture was commissioned by Cardiff County Council, Railtrack, Great Western Railway, Welsh Development Agency, Cardiff Bay Development Corporation and the Wales Tourist Board and was originally sited outside Cardiff Central railway station. It was unveiled in 1999. In 2009 it was moved to Windsor Esplanade in the Cardiff Bay area of Butetown due to the redevelopment of the area around the old bus station.
