= Frank Dilnot =

English author and journalist (1875–1946)

Frank Dilnot (1875–1946) was an English author and journalist, born in Hampshire. He was educated privately and began as a newspaper reporter in 1900 on the staff of the Central News, London, which he left two years later for the Daily Mail (1902–10). He was editor of the Daily Citizen, a British labour organ (1912–15), and thereafter was a correspondent for the Daily Chronicle to investigate social and economic conditions in England. In 1916–19, he was president of the Association of Foreign Correspondents in America, and in the latter year, editor of the Globe.

== Bibliography ==
His publications, the majority of which give evidence of thorough insight into social and economic conditions in England, include:

- The Old Order Changeth: the Passing of Power from the House of Lords (1911)
- Lloyd George the Man and His Story (1917)
- The New America (1919)
- England after the War (1920)
- I Warmed Both Hands (1933)

His Lord George the Man and His Story had a second edition with three supplementary chapters in 1923 under the title Lloyd George. The undiscriminating admiration of the first edition had distinctly ebbed in the supplementary chapters.
