= Giles Dilnot =

British television presenter

- Born: Giles Tristan John Dilnot; 7 January 1971 (age 55); Stoke-on-Trent, Staffordshire, England
- Education: Jesus College, Cambridge (graduated 1993)
- Occupations: Director, journalist, presenter
- Employer: Office of the Children's Commissioner for England
- Known for: Director of Communications and External Affairs, Office of the Children's Commissioner for England (Apr. 2017 –); Director of Communications, Legatum Institute (Aug. 2016 – Apr. 2017); Reporter and relief presenter, Daily Politics, BBC Two (Nov. 2004 – July 2016); Co-presenter, BBC South East Today, BBC One (2002–2004); Reporter, BBC South East Today, BBC One; ConservativeHome
- Spouse(s): Amanda Cook (m. Aug. 1997); separated 2016
- Children: 2

Giles Tristan John Dilnot (born 7 January 1971) is a British journalist and former television presenter and reporter. Since August 2024, he has been editor of ConservativeHome.

== Early life and education ==
Dilnot was born in Stoke-on-Trent, Staffordshire in 1971, and grew up in the village of Leeds (five miles east of the county town of Maidstone) in Kent, where his father was the vicar.

Dilnot was educated on a son-of-clergy bursary at St. John's School, a boarding independent school for boys (now co-educational) in the town of Leatherhead in Surrey, followed by Jesus College, Cambridge, whence he graduated in 1993.

== Career ==
Dilnot first worked at Chiltern Radio, a commercial radio station in the Chilterns area of Bedfordshire and at Mercia FM radio station in Coventry, followed by the BBC's former radio station GLR (since renamed BBC London 94.9), for which he reported, produced and presented. He moved to BBC Southern Counties Radio in Guildford, in the same county as his former senior school, and then joined the television launch of BBC South East Today in 2001, becoming a co-presenter of the programme a year later.

In November 2004 an effigy of Dilnot was burned at the Lewes bonfire celebrations. BBC South East Today had angered some members of Sussex bonfire societies by its reporting of an allegedly racist display at the nearby Firle bonfire night in 2003, where an effigy of a Gypsy family in a caravan was burned.

In November 2004, Dilnot joined BBC2's Daily Politics programme as a regular reporter and co-presenter, regularly interviewing members of the public on current political and social issues. He has also appeared on a variety of programmes such as the Politics Show (the forerunner of the current Sunday Politics) on BBC1 and the early morning news magazine programme BBC Breakfast. He has stood in for regular presenters on BBC Radio 5 Live and has made three radio documentaries for BBC Radio 4.

Chris Marsden, the national secretary of the Socialist Equality Party (SEP), accused Dilnot of issuing "politically slanderous" commentary during a live interview claiming his comment "crossed accepted journalistic boundaries", a complaint that was later rejected. While interviewing Marsden for BBC 2's Daily Politics on 21 May 2014 during the campaign for the European election, Dilnot, referring to Marsden's claim that existing news media would be removed in a revolution, said "Please tell me I am not first up against the wall when it comes." According to Marsden, who officially complained to the BBC, he could only reply "Of course not" before the item ended and was handed back to the studio. Marsden's complaint was not upheld, and on the programme a week later he was invited to explain why he had complained.

Dilnot left the BBC in July 2016, and in August 2016 he joined the public policy think tank the Legatum Institute as its Director of Communications.

He left the Legatum Institute in April 2017 to join the Office of the then Children's Commissioner for England (Anne Longfield OBE) as its Director of Communications and External Affairs. In September 2022 he was appointed a Special Advisor to the Foreign Secretary and later the Home Secretary.

Dilnot was appointed editor of ConservativeHome in August 2024.
