= BBC Cymru Wales New Broadcasting House =

Television studio and office in Central Square, Cardiff

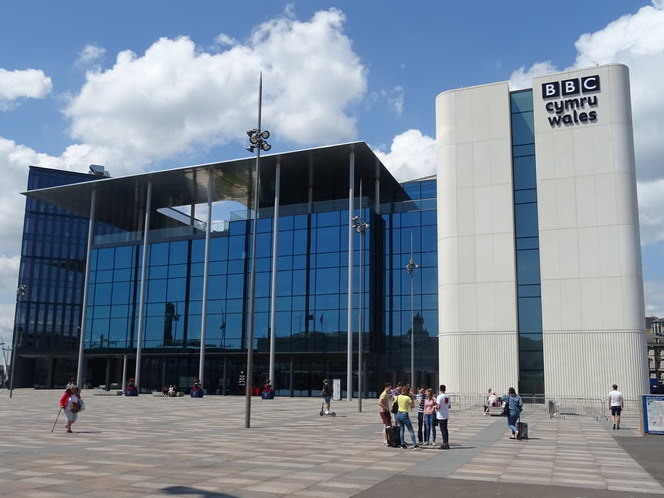
- July 2019

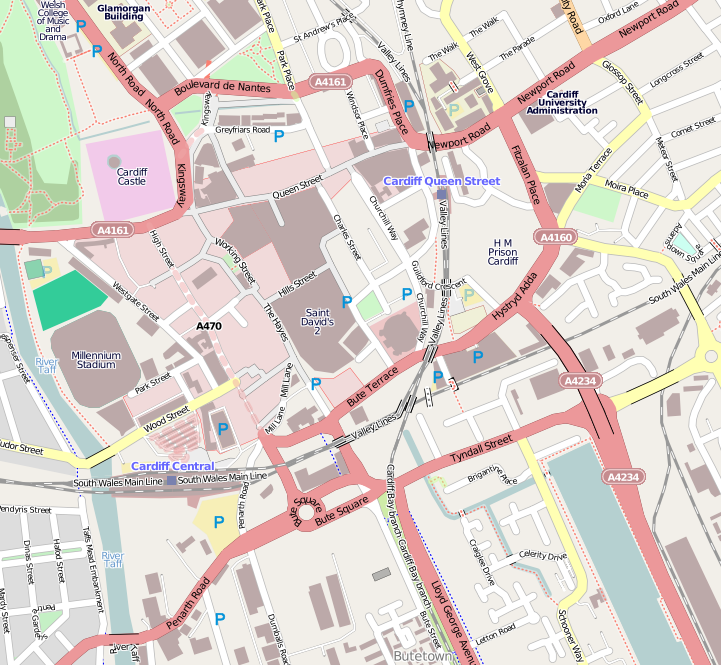
- Location within Central Cardiff

General information
- Status: Open
- Type: Broadcasting office and retail units
- Architectural style: High-tech architecture
- Location: Cardiff city centre, BBC Cymru Wales, Central Square, Cardiff; CF10 1FT, Cardiff, Wales
- Coordinates: 51°28′36″N 3°10′46″W
- Current tenants: BBC Cymru Wales; S4C, Boots, Greggs, Tesco, Pret a Manger
- Construction started: 7 December 2015
- Completed: 1 August 2019
- Opened: October 2019
- Cost: £120,000,000
- Client: BBC Cymru Wales

Height
- Height: 30 m (98 ft)

Technical details
- Floor count: 5
- Floor area: 14,454 m^{2} (155,580 sq ft)
- Grounds: 26,000 m^{2} (280,000 sq ft)

Design and construction
- Architect: Gerard Evenden
- Architecture firm: Foster + Partners
- Developer: Rightacres Property
- Engineer: Arup
- Structural engineer: Arup
- Civil engineer: AECOM
- Other designers: ID:SR Sheppard Robson (interior)
- Quantity surveyor: Currie & Brown
- Main contractor: ISG
- Awards: 2019 – RICS Awards, Winner, Innovation in Design; 2019 – Insider Property Awards, Wales – Development of the Year; 2019 – Constructing Excellence Awards, Wales, Winner, Building Project of the Year; 2020 – Best Fit Out of a Workplace (South West) by the British Council for Offices.

BBC Cymru Wales New Broadcasting House, previously known as the BBC Cymru Wales headquarters building, is the headquarters of BBC Cymru Wales in Central Square, Cardiff. It operates many of its broadcasting services (radio and TV) from there using IP-based studios. It also serves as a base for S4C.

The £120 million building replaced the BBC Cymru Wales Broadcasting House in Llandaff, when 1,000 production and support staff began moving into the new facility in October 2019. The building is officially located at 3 Central Square, but has also been referred to as BBC New Broadcasting House.

== Operation ==
The interior of New Broadcasting House

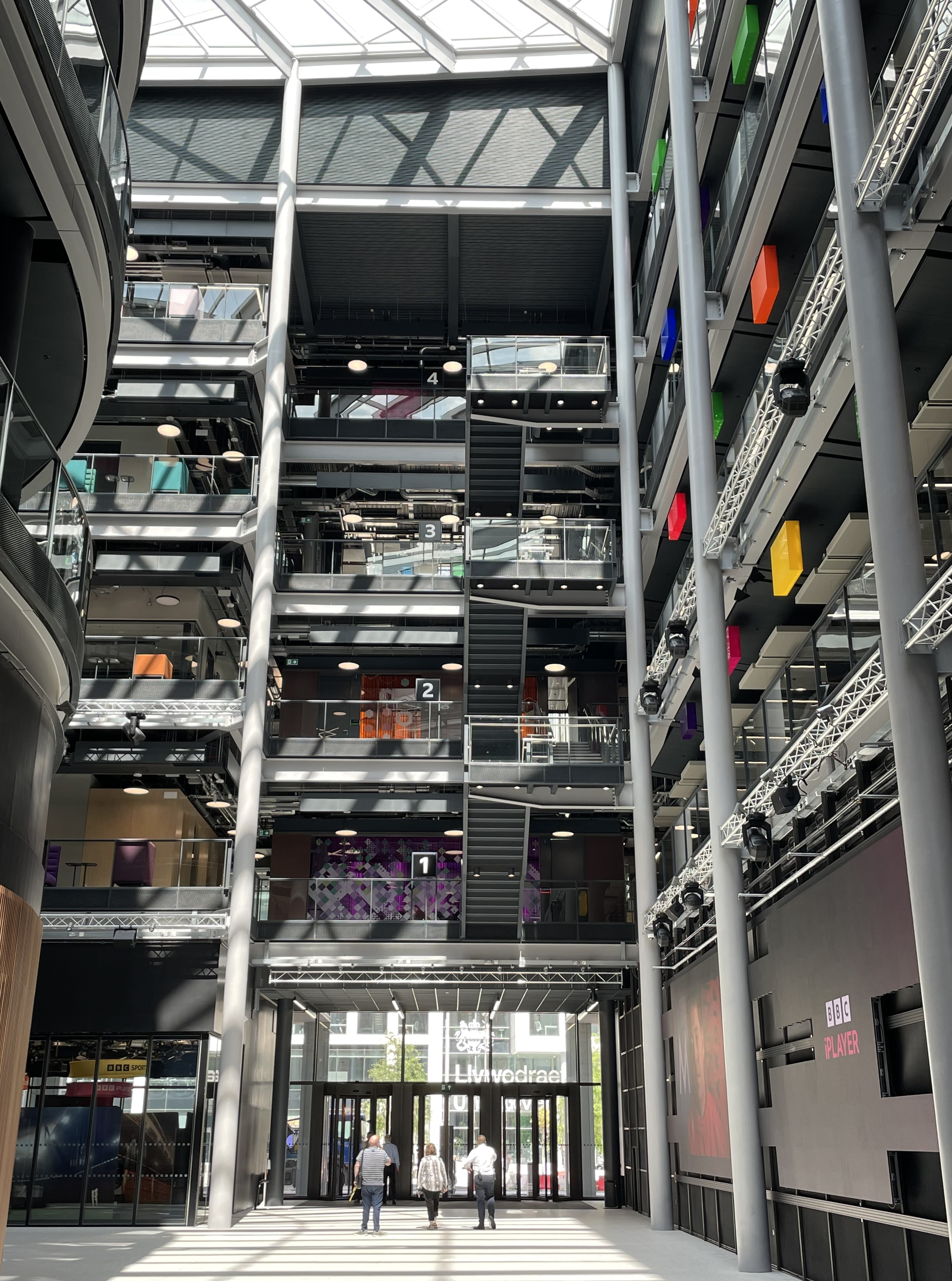
Atrium, looking towards the Wood St entrance

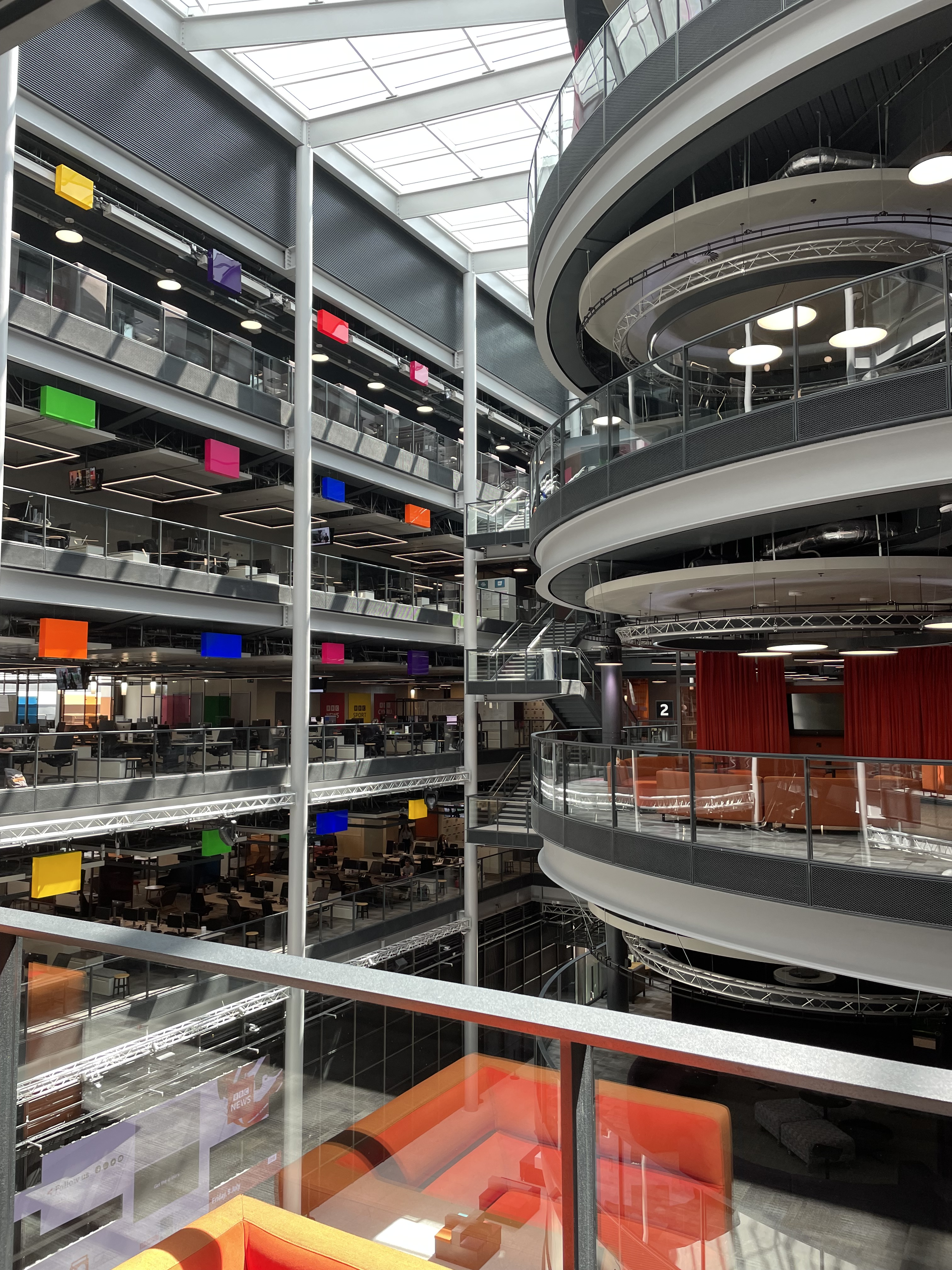
Atrium, looking in the direction of the Central Square entrance

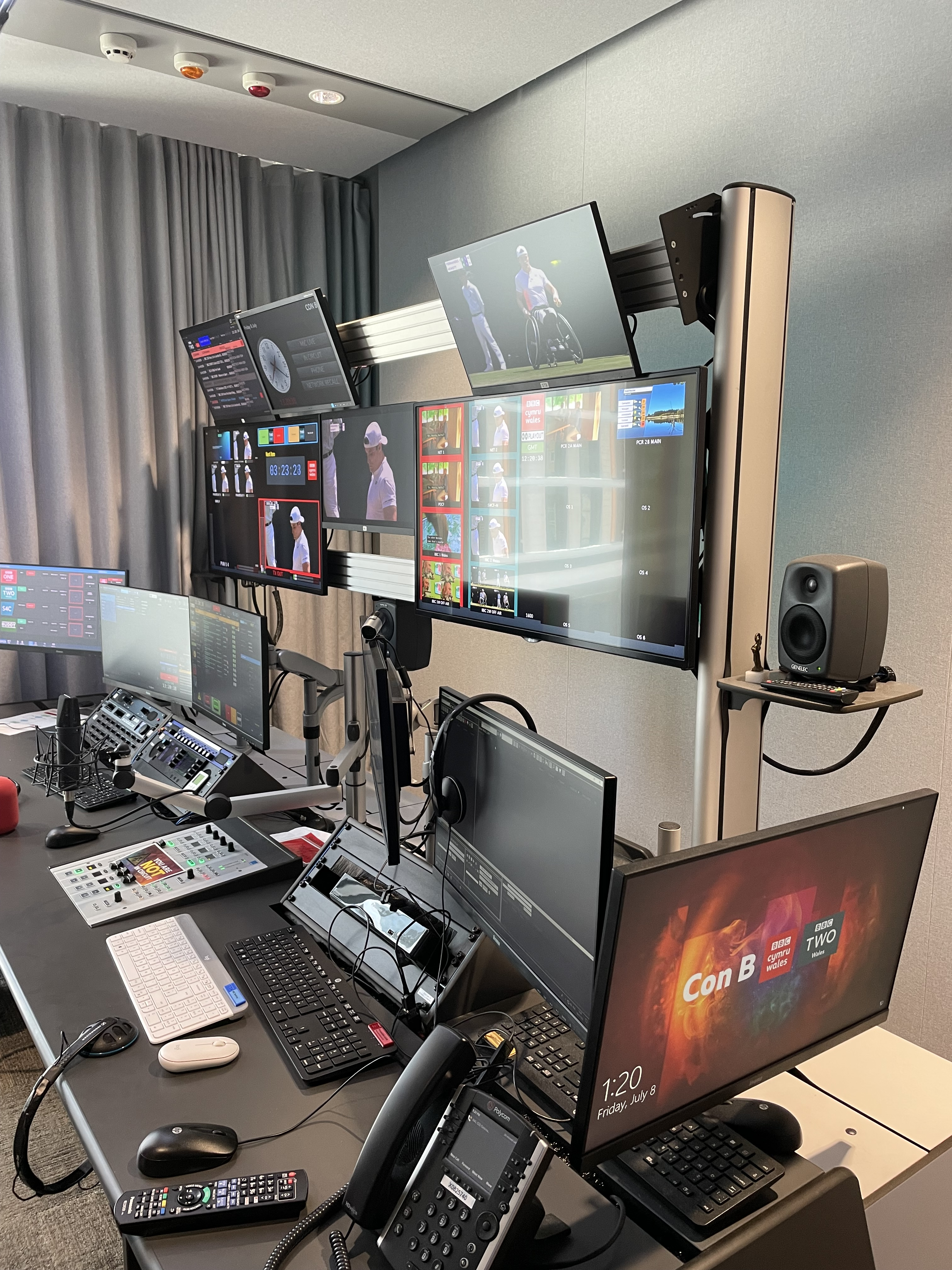
Console B for the BBC Two Wales continuity announcer

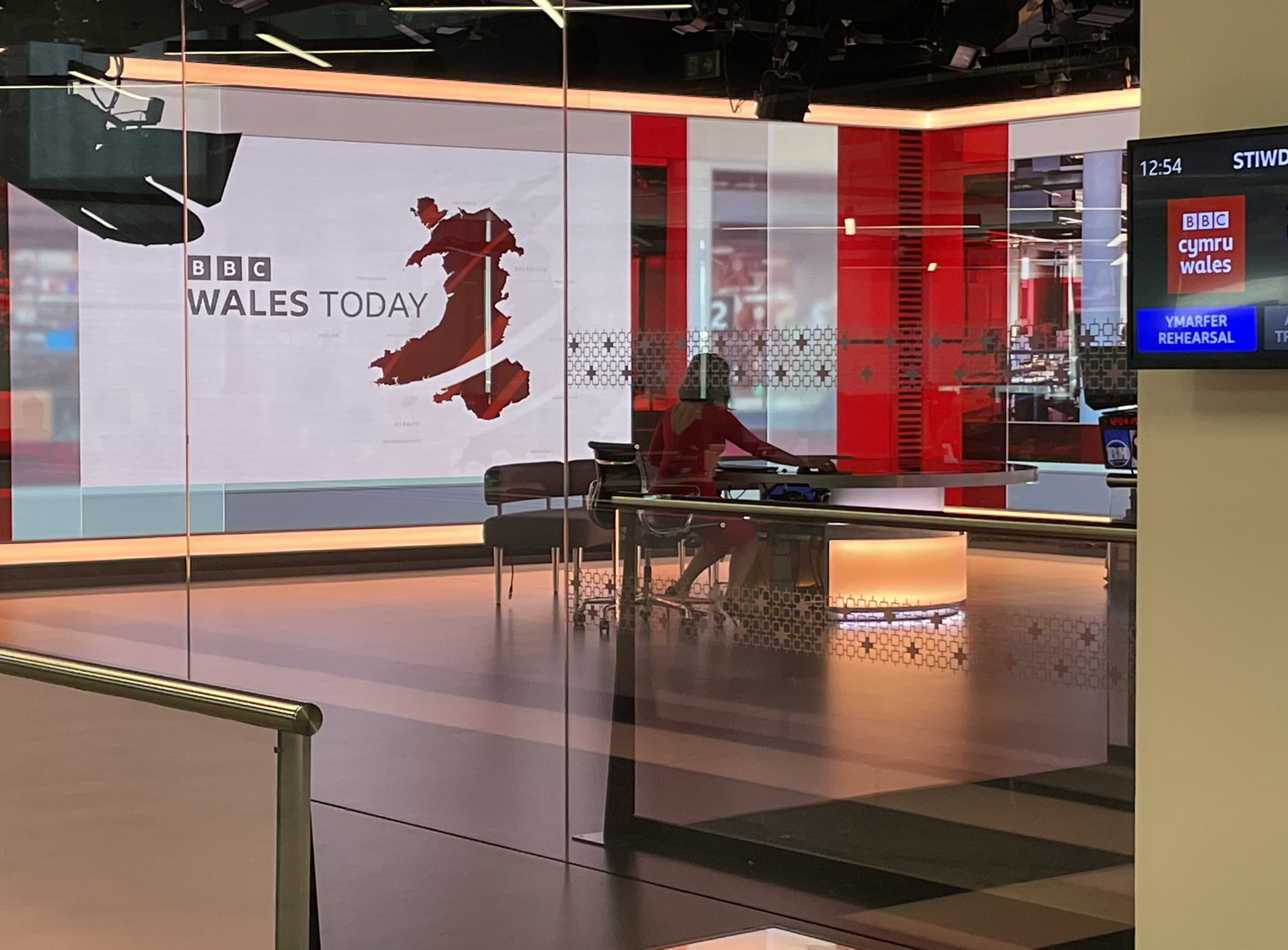
Lucy Owen presenting BBC Wales Today in one of the TV studios in New Broadcasting House

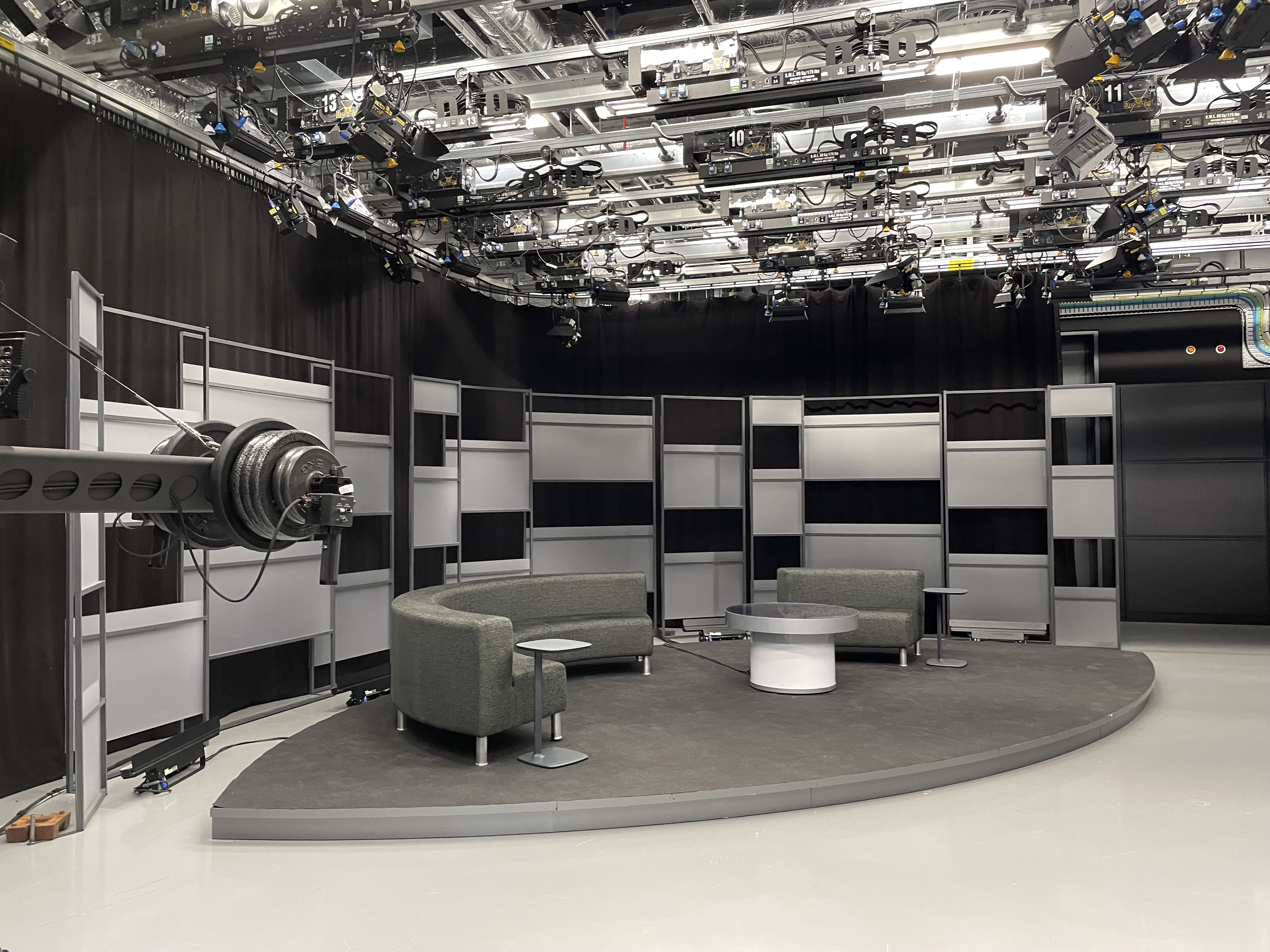
General studio on the ground floor of New Broadcasting House

The building's first live transmission was made on 14 July 2020 by continuity announcer Tim Cooper on BBC Two Wales. Continuity announcer-director Leanne Thomas introduced the Six O'Clock News on BBC One Wales for the first time on 15 July.

This was followed by the first radio broadcasts - by BBC Radio Cymru 2 host Daniel Glyn on 25 July and BBC Radio Wales host Owen Money on 31 July.

TV news programmes including BBC Wales Today for BBC One Wales and Newyddion for S4C transferred from Llandaff to Central Square in September 2020,

On 27 January 2021, S4C moved its TV and online operations from Parc Tŷ Glas, in Llanishen, Cardiff to Central Square from where the channel now broadcasts. Under a partnership agreement, BBC Wales provides S4C's playout and other technology services.

The building has achieved the BREEAM "Outstanding" rating, which was first introduced in August 2008 to recognise a new standard of sustainability for exemplary buildings. The building will also be the first BBC building to use live IP (internet protocol) technology, it also has augmented reality, virtual reality and robotic cameras.

== Design and construction ==
Construction started in December 2015 on the site of the former Cardiff Central bus station. The building is half the size of the former Broadcasting House in Llandaff. The BBC received the keys to the building in April 2018, after which the headquarters was fitted out with new technology before staff moved in, around October 2019.

The building has been designed by Foster + Partners, with the interior design by Overbury and Sheppard Robson. There will be four floors providing office, studio and production space. There will be desk space for 750 staff, on the basis that not all the 1,200 staff will be on site at the same time.

The internal size of Central Square over several floors is 155,582 square feet (14,454.0 m^{2}), making it nearly 1.5 times the area of the Millennium Stadium pitch.

It is envisaged that an estimated 50,000 people will visit the new building every year. The BBC agreed a 20-year lease on the building at an annual rent of around £25 per square foot per annum with Rightacres Property Company, the developer of the Central Square.

Construction of New Broadcasting House

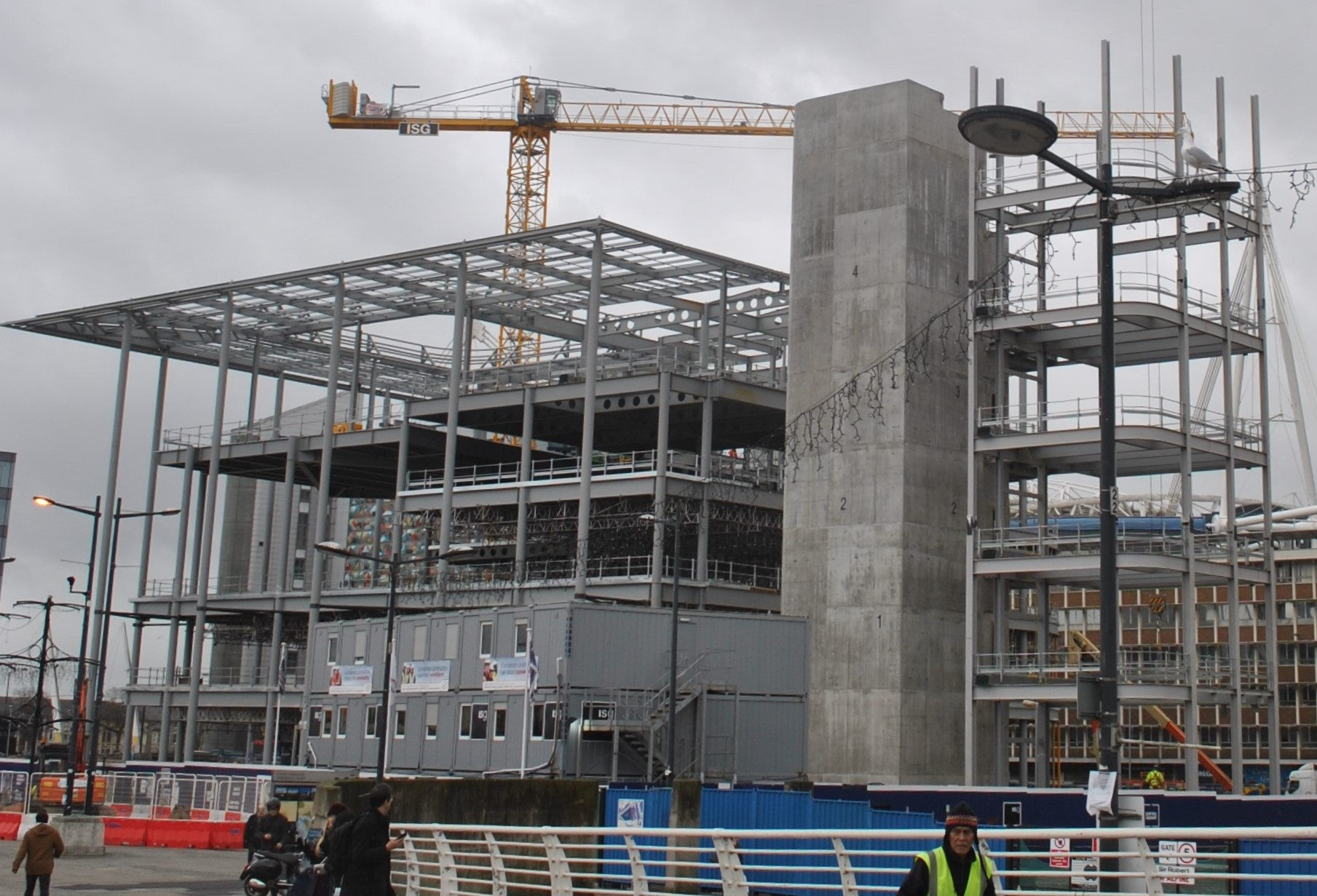
January 2017

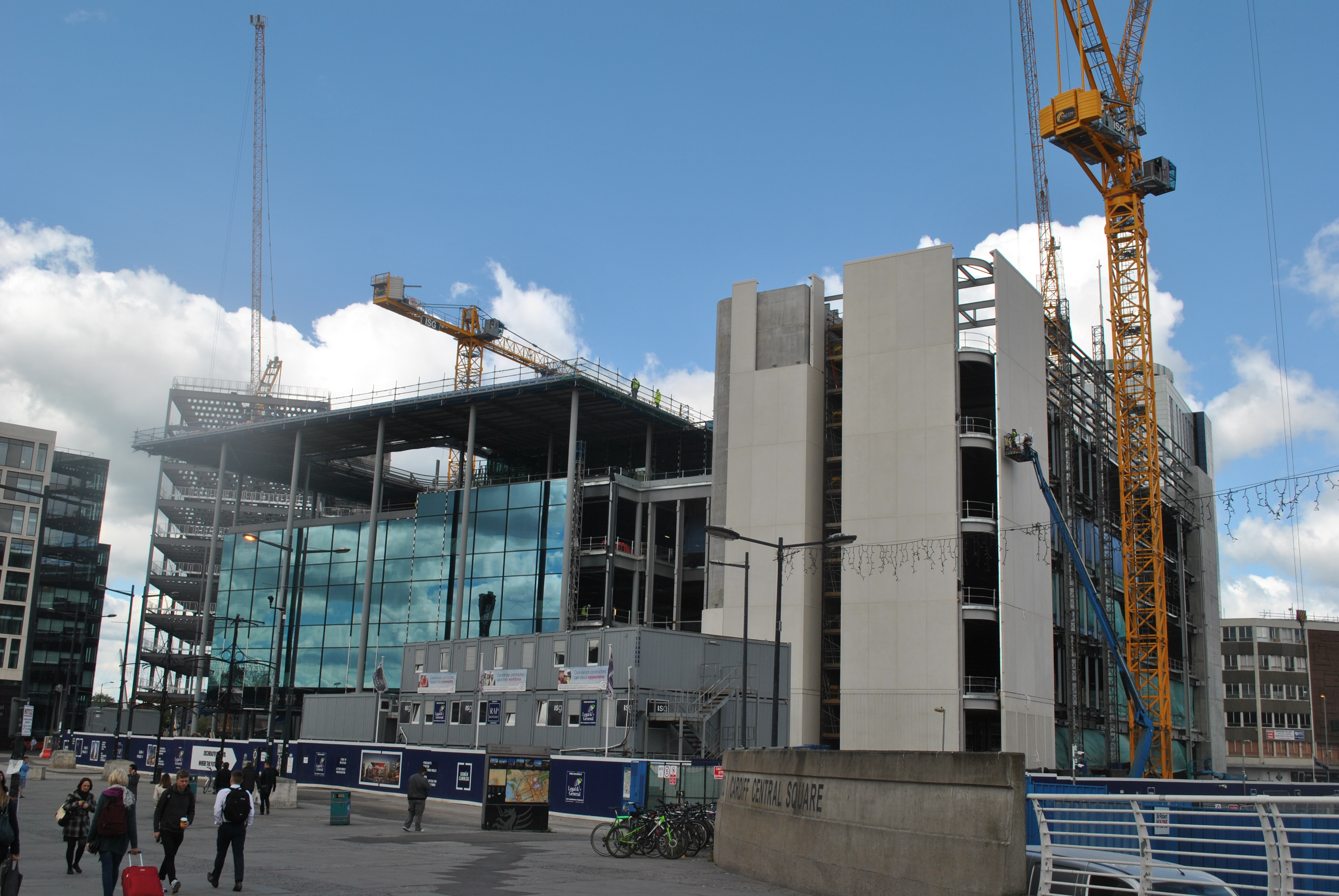
April 2017

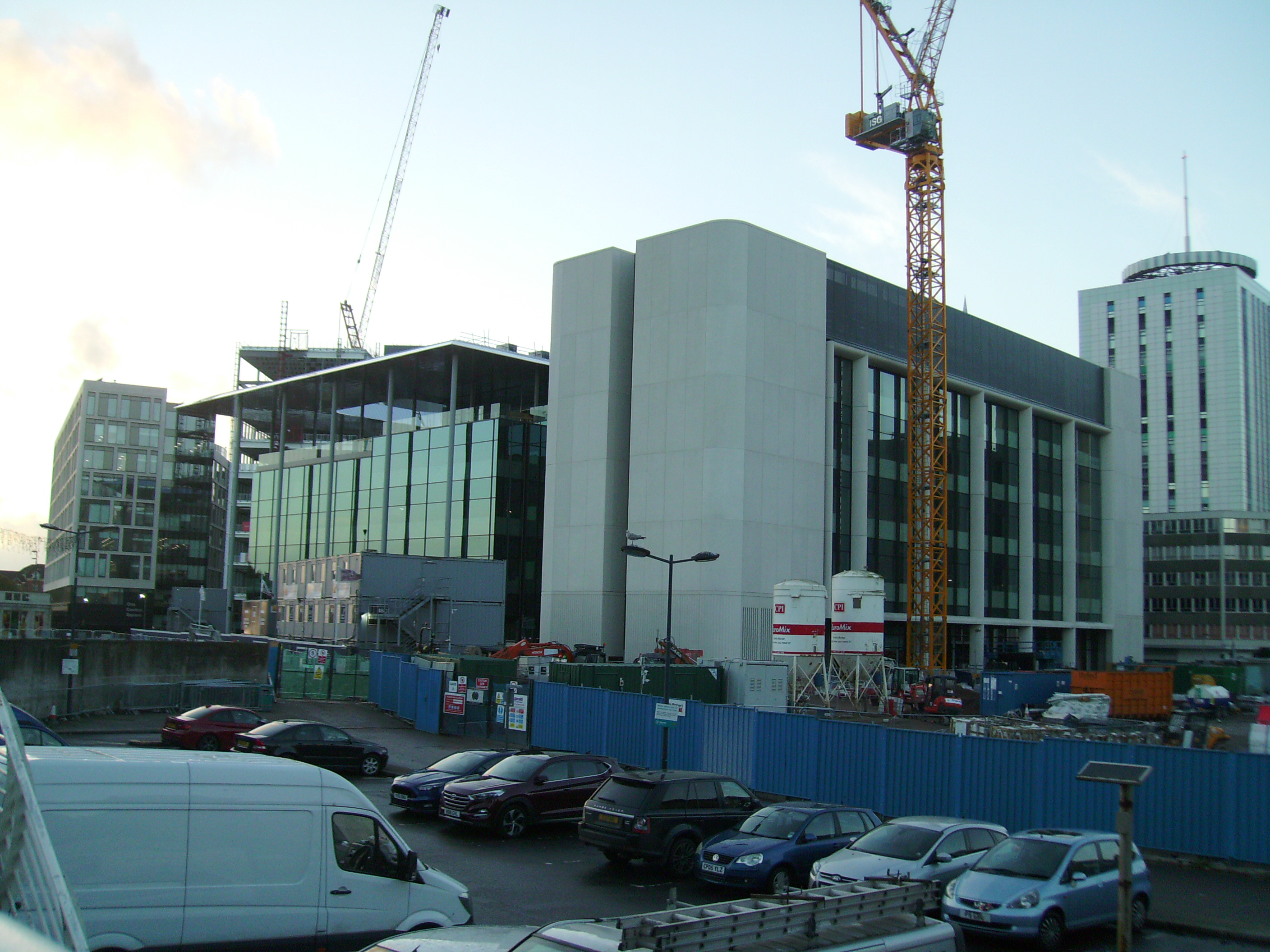
October 2017

== See also ==
- Media in Cardiff
- Architecture of Cardiff
