= Architecture of Cardiff =

Overview of the architecture in the capital city of Wales

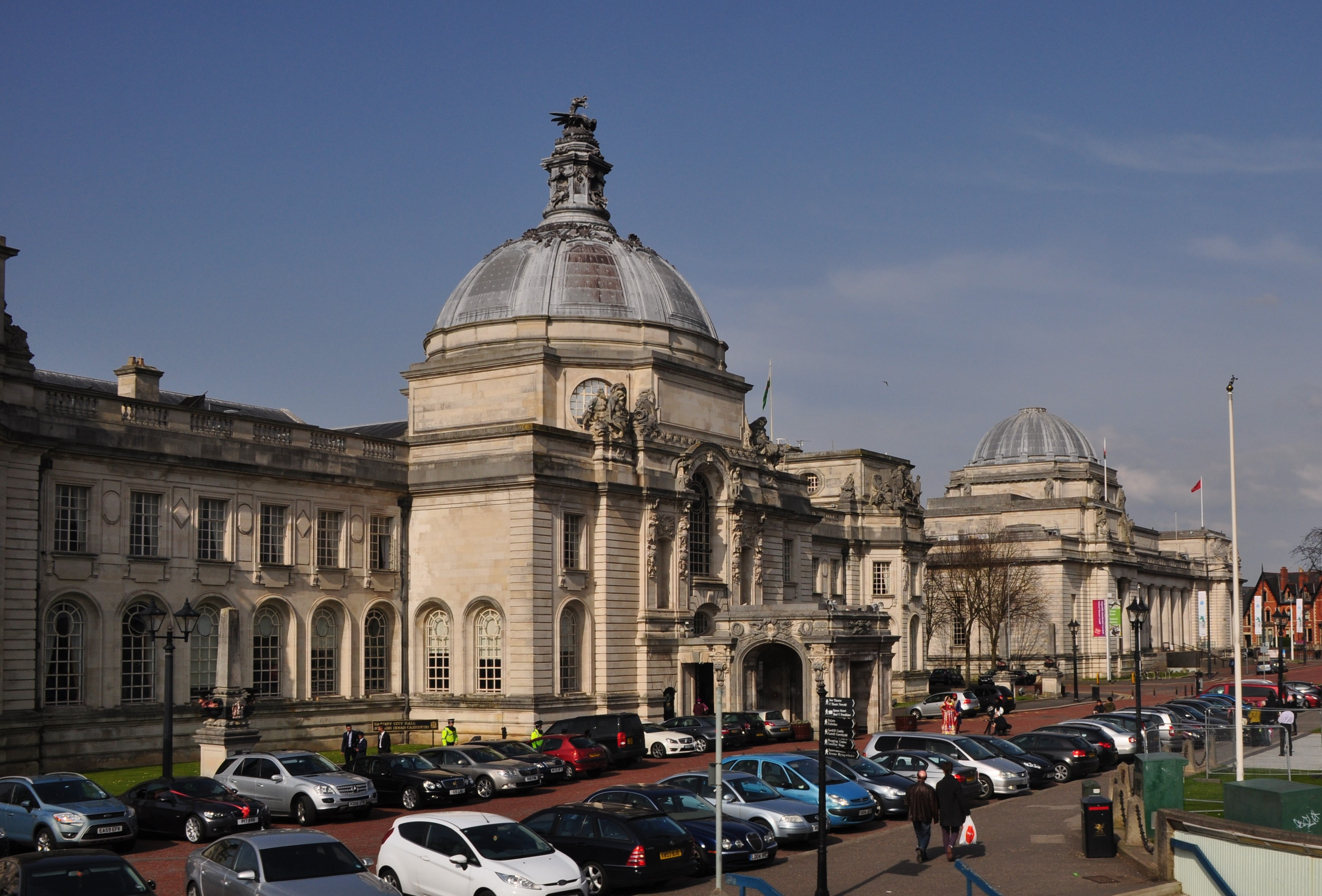
Cardiff City Hall (left) and National Museum Cardiff (right), Cathays Park

Architecture in Cardiff, the capital city of Wales, dates from Norman times to the present day. Its urban fabric is largely Victorian and later, reflecting Cardiff's rise to prosperity as a major coal port in the 19th century. No single building style is associated with Cardiff, but the city centre retains several 19th and early 20th century shopping arcades.

The city is noted for its fantasy castles, Cardiff Castle and Castell Coch, both by the Victorian architect William Burges. The well-preserved early 20th century Civic Centre, surrounding Cathays Park, was described as one of the best examples of civic planning in Britain.

The city contains a number of notable modern buildings and engineering projects. These include the Millennium Stadium (1999) in the city centre and several examples in the major urban regeneration project of Cardiff Bay, for example the Wales Millennium Centre and the Senedd.

The western suburb of St Fagans contains an open-air museum of Welsh vernacular architecture, the St Fagans National History Museum.

== Building materials ==
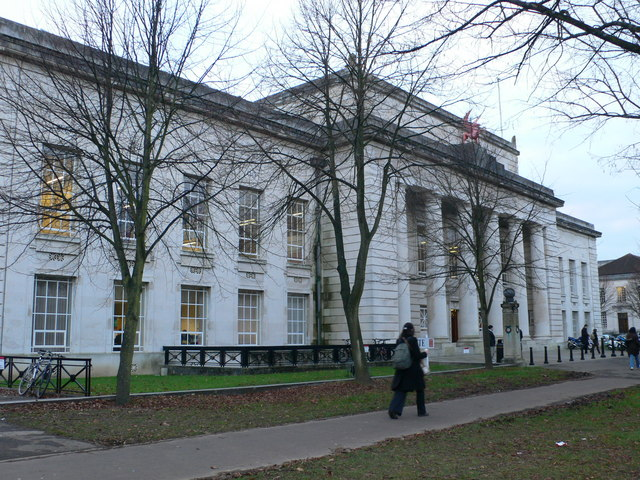
Bute Building in Cathays Park built in Portland stone

The common building materials of Cardiff's Victorian and Edwardian buildings are Bath stone, blue Pennant stone and red brick – except in Cathays Park, where Portland stone predominates. Grey Lias stone features heavily in the construction of the city's medieval buildings (the keep of Cardiff Castle, Llandaff Cathedral and St John the Baptist's church), but is absent from later buildings. Two recent buildings in Cardiff Bay, the Senedd and the Wales Millennium Centre, make conspicuous use of Welsh slate together with glass and steel.

== Early and medieval buildings ==
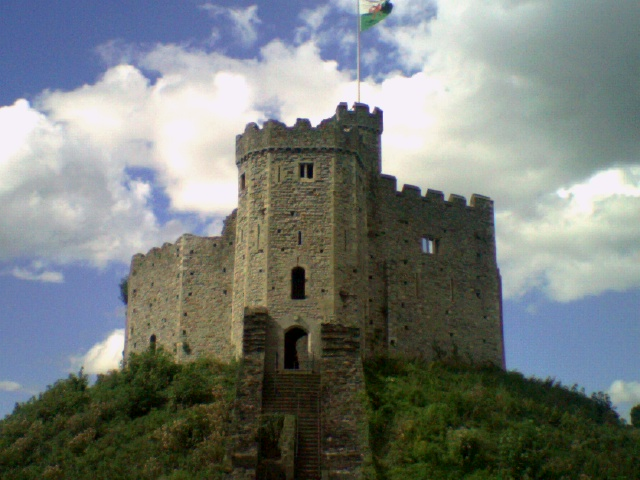
Cardiff Castle 12th-century Keep

Perhaps the most noted individual building in the city is Cardiff Castle, a fortress of Roman foundation with a ruined 12th-century medieval keep and exterior walls. After Cardiff Castle, the oldest remaining building in the city centre is St John's Parish Church, which dates from the 12th century but was almost totally reconstructed during the 15th century. It has a fine Perpendicular style nave and tower.

The medieval town walls were removed as the town developed and nowadays only two very small sections remain. The modernised Womanby Street is one of the few remaining original medieval streets, that lead from the town's original quay to the castle.

Two monastic buildings existed in Cardiff, Greyfriars (demolished for Capital Tower) and Blackfriars, established in the late 13th century. Greyfriars was converted into a family mansion but was demolished to make way for a carpark and office block during the 20th century. The foundations of Blackfriars can still be seen in Bute Park.

Llandaff Cathedral dates from 1107 but was built on the site of a pre-Norman building. It was significantly extended in the 13th and 15th centuries. Nearby are the ruins of the Bishop's Palace, destroyed by the forces of Owain Glyndŵr in 1400.

== 19th-century architecture ==
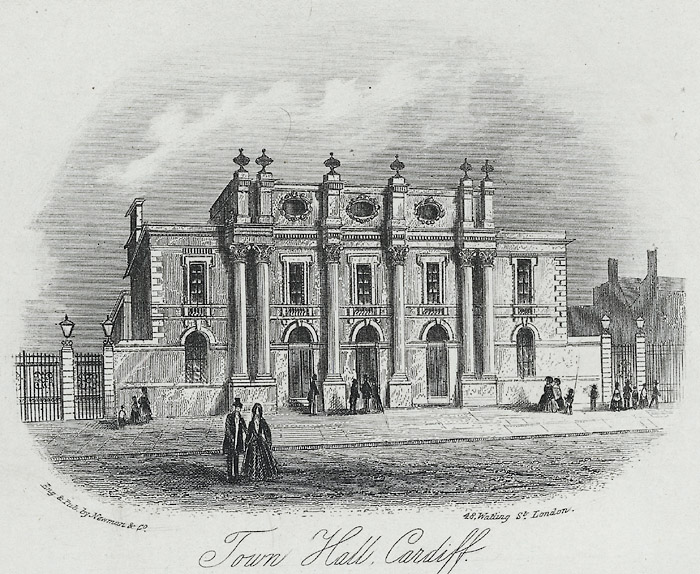
Horace Jones's Town Hall on St Mary Street

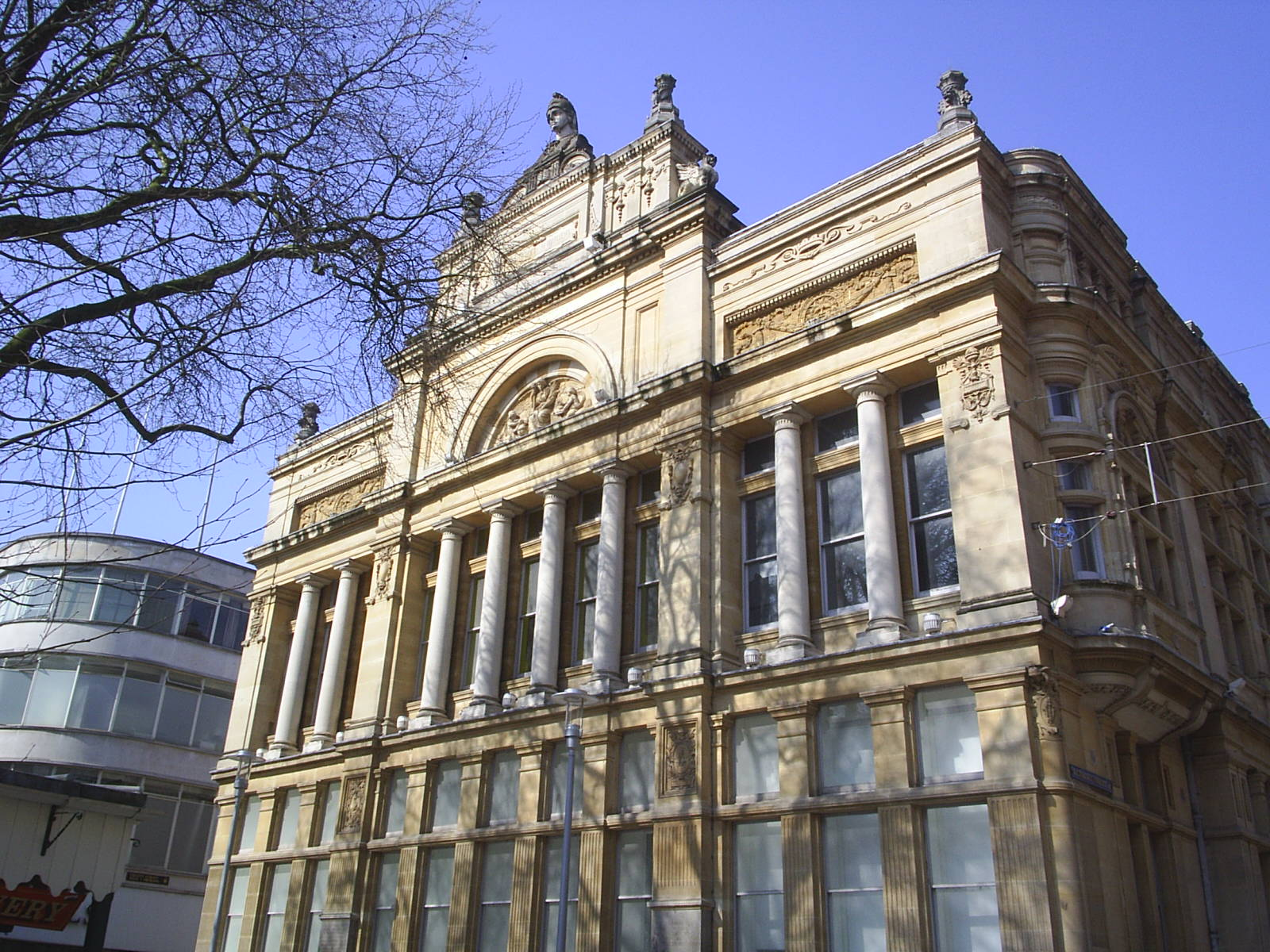
Cardiff Old Library (1882)

With the arrival of the railways and a rapidly expanding coal export industry, Cardiff changed beyond recognition during the mid nineteenth century. It became the largest town in Wales in 1875. From the 1840s new residential streets were built in Butetown and Temperance Town (completed 1864).

Much of the land on which Cardiff was built was owned by John Crichton-Stuart, 2nd Marquess of Bute. Much of Cardiff and many of its buildings were designed by the marquess's architect, Alexander Roos.

New churches and chapels were created, including a new Romanesque St Mary's Church on Bute Street. Noted local architect John Prichard designed St Margaret's Church, Roath and St John's Church, Canton, also refurbishing Llandaff Cathedral. The (surviving) Tabernacl chapel in The Hayes is described as the "finest classical chapel of the period". Important architects from outside Wales arrived, designing St David's Roman Catholic church (1887) in Charles Street, amongst others.

In 1853 a new "graceless but vigorous" colonnaded Town Hall and Corn Exchange (Cardiff's fourth town hall) replaced the old Guildhall in High Street. Horace Jones of London had been the winners of the design competition, controversially, because the cost limit was £8,000, while Jones scheme was estimated at £11,690. The building was extended in 1876 but was eventually replaced in the early 20th century.

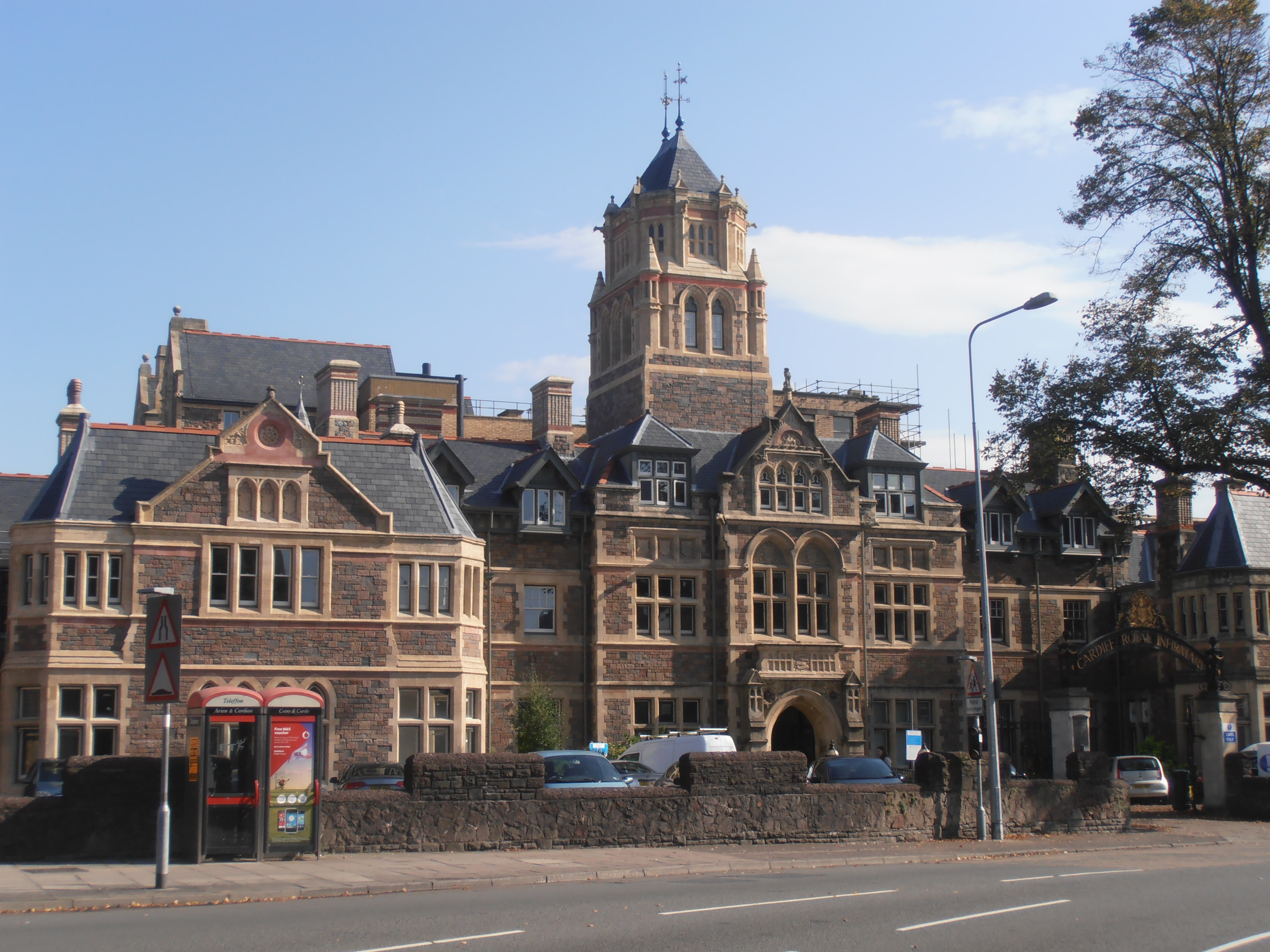
Cardiff Royal Infirmary

New shops, bank buildings and hotels appeared, including the Royal Hotel (1866), Great Western Hotel (1876) and Park Hotel (1885). Cardiff's "fascinating and delightful" Victorian shopping arcades were built: High Street Arcade (1885), Wyndham Arcade (1886), Castle Arcade (1887) and Morgan Arcade (1896).

Important new public buildings were created, including the Central Library, Cardiff Royal Infirmary, St David's Hospital, the Theatre Royal (later renamed the Prince of Wales Theatre), Grand Theatre (Westgate Street) and the University College of South Wales.

Impressive new buildings were constructed in Butetown to serve the dockland economy. These included the Coal Exchange (1883–86) in Mount Stuart Square and the imposing French-Gothic Pierhead Building (1896) at the docks entrance.

=== William Burges ===
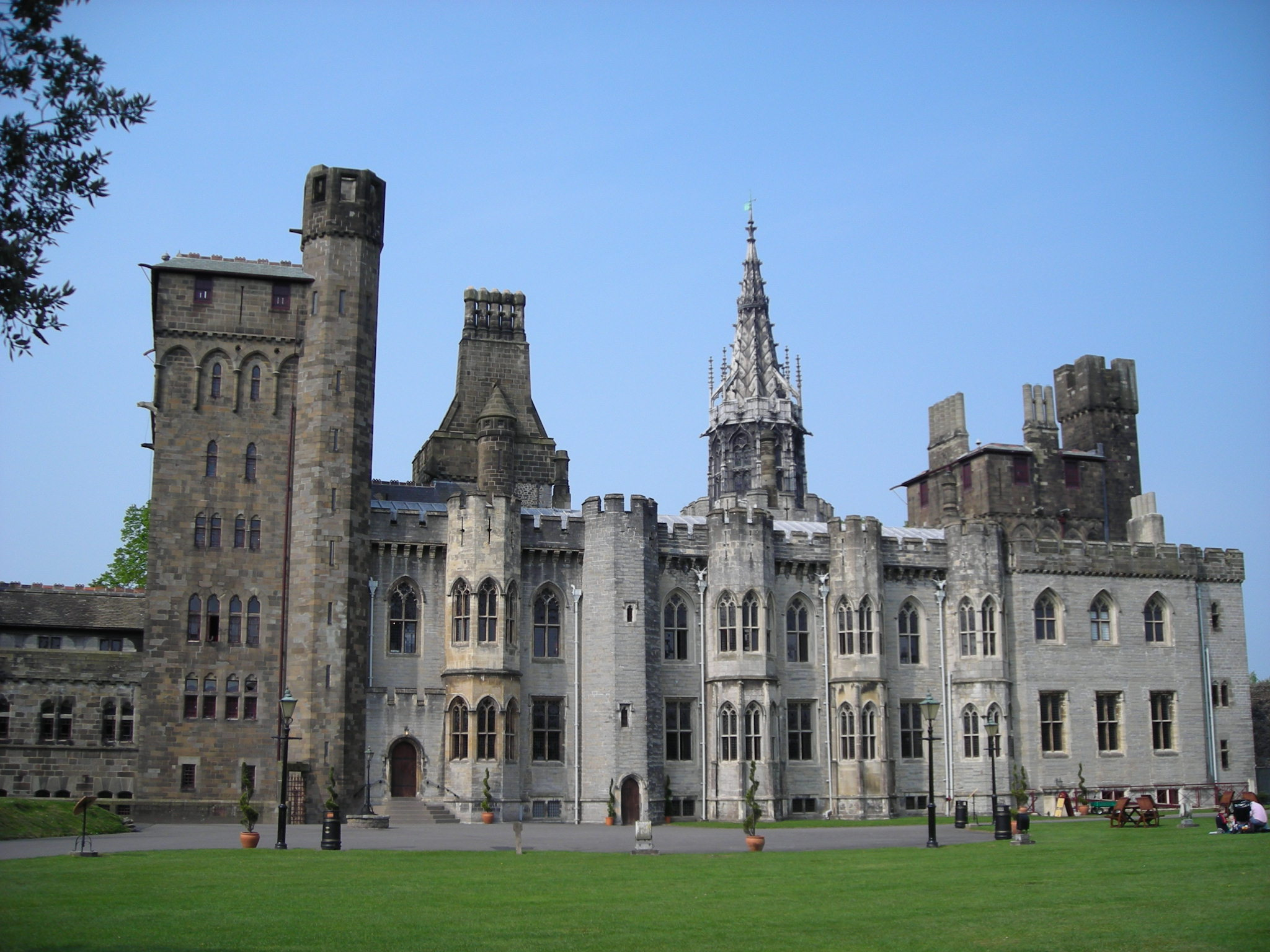
Cardiff Castle

William Burges' contribution to Welsh architecture was notable but limited to three buildings, Cardiff Castle, Castell Coch and Park House The influence of Park House was significant to the architecture of Wales; John Newman considers the house "revolutionized Cardiff's domestic architecture"" and the Cadw Grade I listed building status given to the house records it as "the pattern for much housing in Cardiff in later C19. Perhaps the most important (nineteenth century) town house in Wales." While Burges' style was highly creative it is often difficult to pin down the stylistic sources of his designs. Mordaunt Crook remarks that Burges drew on his extensive travels and the studies he had made of the campanilii of San Gimaggnano, Florence and Siena. He included recollections of Nuremberg and Palermo, of the Chateau de Chillonon on Lake Geneva, the Castello at Milan and the Palais des Papes at Avignon. Nearer home he took elements from Conway, Caernarvon and Durham Castles.

==== Cardiff Castle ====
Cardiff Castle was restored and redesigned between 1868 and 1890. The Marquis of Bute had a momentous partnership with Burges that was to last for sixteen years, with Cardiff Castle transformed into a Neo- Gothic dream palace. Bute's workmen pulled down the houses built against the South Curtain Wall. Burges restored the stonework, and he added a covered parapet walk with embrasures and arrow slits. The Clock Tower was built on the site of a Roman bastion and completed in 1875. The scheme included the Medieval buildings of the West wing which had been "gothicised" by Henry Holland in 1774. Burges designed a Nursery especially for the Bute children. The Bute Tower and Herbert Towers, as well as the new Guest and Tank Towers, were rebuilt. The 15th-century Octagon Tower was restored with the addition of a timber spire. Burges created a Library and the Banqueting Hall within the late medieval residential block. When Burges died in 1881, his work was continued by his former assistant William Frame.

==== Park House ====
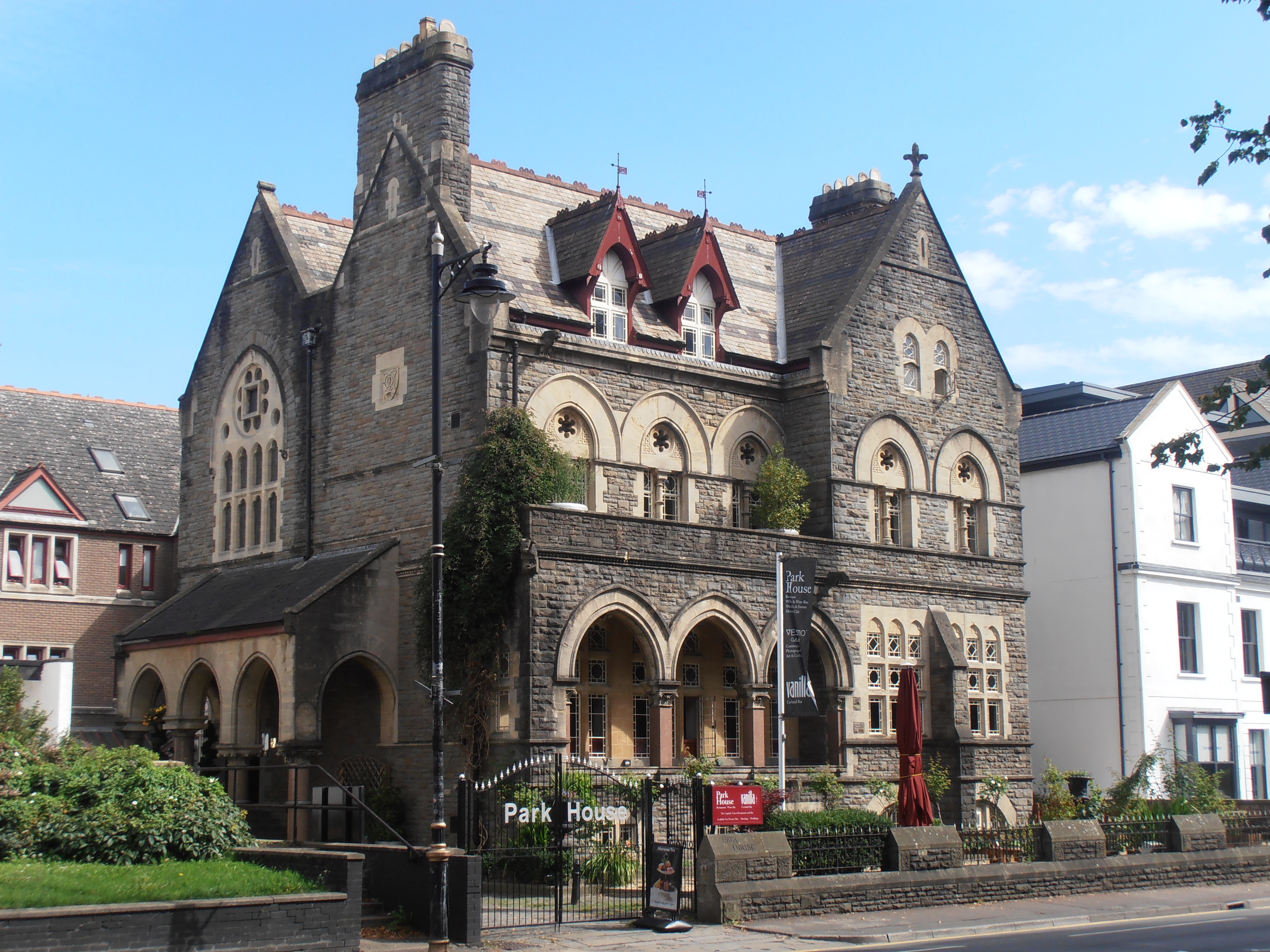
Park House, Park Place, Cardiff

Park House was built between 1871 and 1875 for James McConnochie, the dock engineer to Bute Estate. McConnochie was Mayor of Cardiff in 1880. The house has been used as a restaurant since 2012. The house draws on various French Gothic elements and is reminiscent of the Town Hall of St. Antonin, restored by Viollet le Duc in 1843, with late Romanesque and a Gothic arcade, but with added 15th-century dormer windows. It is built with grey Caerphilly stone and Bath stone dressings; steeply pitched slate roofs, stone chimneys. Features of the house were imitated by other late Victorian houses in Cardiff. Similar houses such as Llanilar at Abermad (1870–1872) in Ceredigion were being built by John Pollard Seddon.

==== Castell Coch ====
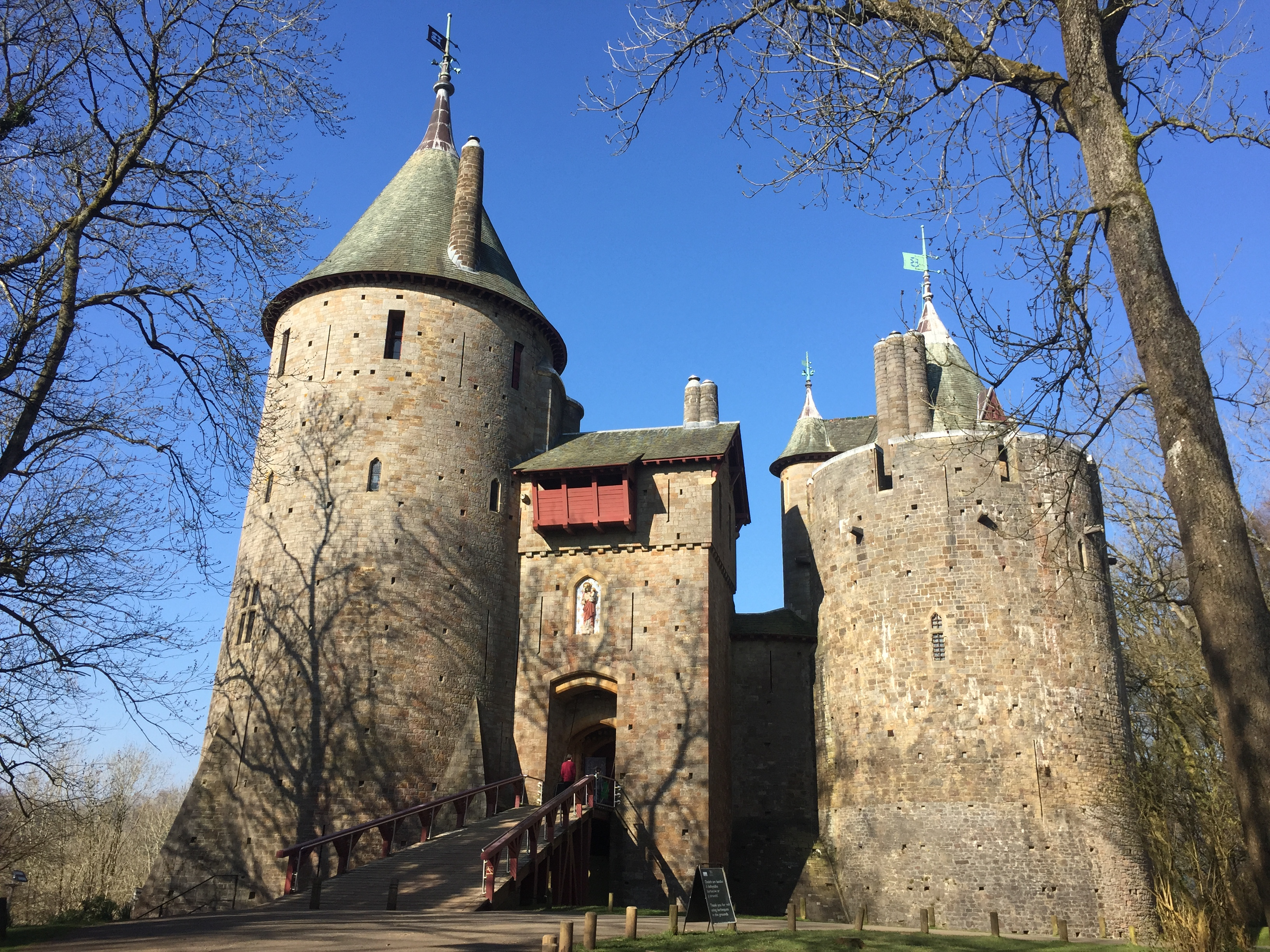
Castell Coch – exterior

Castell Coch, a ruined medieval castle, lying to north of Cardiff, was intended as an occasional summer residence for the Marquess of Bute. Burges's reported on the proposed reconstruction of Castell Coch in 1872 and construction started in 1875. The exterior comprises three towers, "almost equal to each other in diameter, but arrestingly dissimilar in height ."The Keep tower, the Well Tower and the Kitchen Tower incorporate a series of apartments, of which the main sequence, the Castellan's Rooms, lie within the Keep. The Hall, the Drawing Room, Lord Bute's Bedroom and Lady Bute's bedroom comprise a suite of rooms that exemplify the High Victorian Gothic style in 19th-century Britain. The octagonal chamber with its great rib-vault, modelled on one designed by Viollet-Le-Duc at Councy, is "spangled with butterflies and birds of sunny plume in gilded trellis work." Off the hall, lies the Windlass Room, in which Burges assembled the fully functioning apparatus for the drawbridge.

== 20th-century architecture ==
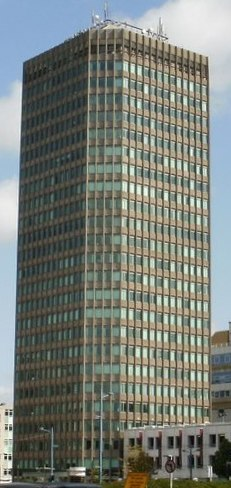
Capital Tower

The civic centre at Cathays Park, whose earliest building dates from 1901, is a notable example in the United Kingdom of city planning on Beaux-Arts principles.

In the 1941 Cardiff Blitz, Llandaff Cathedral sustained a direct hit. It was restored by George Pace, who added a concrete parabolic arch in the nave to support a new sculpture by Jacob Epstein, Majestas.

The Festival-style Empire Pool was built in the Cardiff Arms Park for the 1958 Empire Games; this was demolished in 1999.

BBC Broadcasting House in Llandaff (now demolished), designed in 1967 by Dale Owen of Percy Thomas & Partners, who had worked in Chicago under Walter Gropius, drew inspiration from modernist architecture in the United States such as Gropius's Harvard Graduate Center and Ludwig Mies van der Rohe's apartments on Lake Shore Drive, Chicago.

Cardiff Central police station, built between 1966 and 1968 in the classical civic centre of Cardiff is described as "The most successful post-war building in Cathays Park."

Cardiff Bay Visitor Centre (Will Alsop and John Lyall, 1990) – claimed to have "single-handedly put Cardiff on the architectural map". In 2010 it was dismantled to make way for a new road.

== 21st-century architecture ==
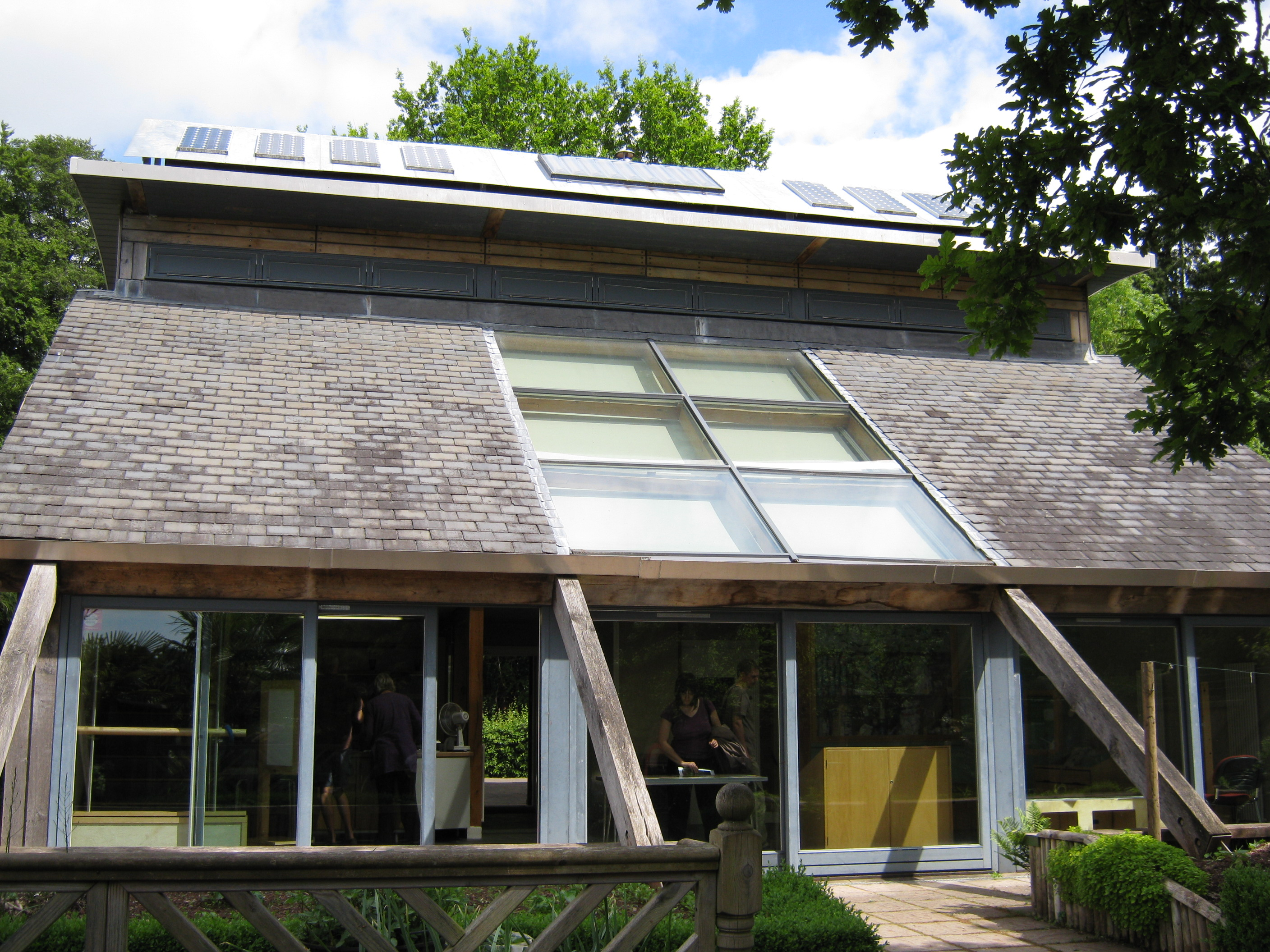
House for the Future

Cardiff began the new century in 2000 with the completion of a House for the Future at the St Fagans National History Museum. It was a joint initiative between BBC Wales and Malcolm Parry of the Welsh School of Architecture and aimed to create a zero carbon house on a reasonable £120,000 budget, using the latest technologies.

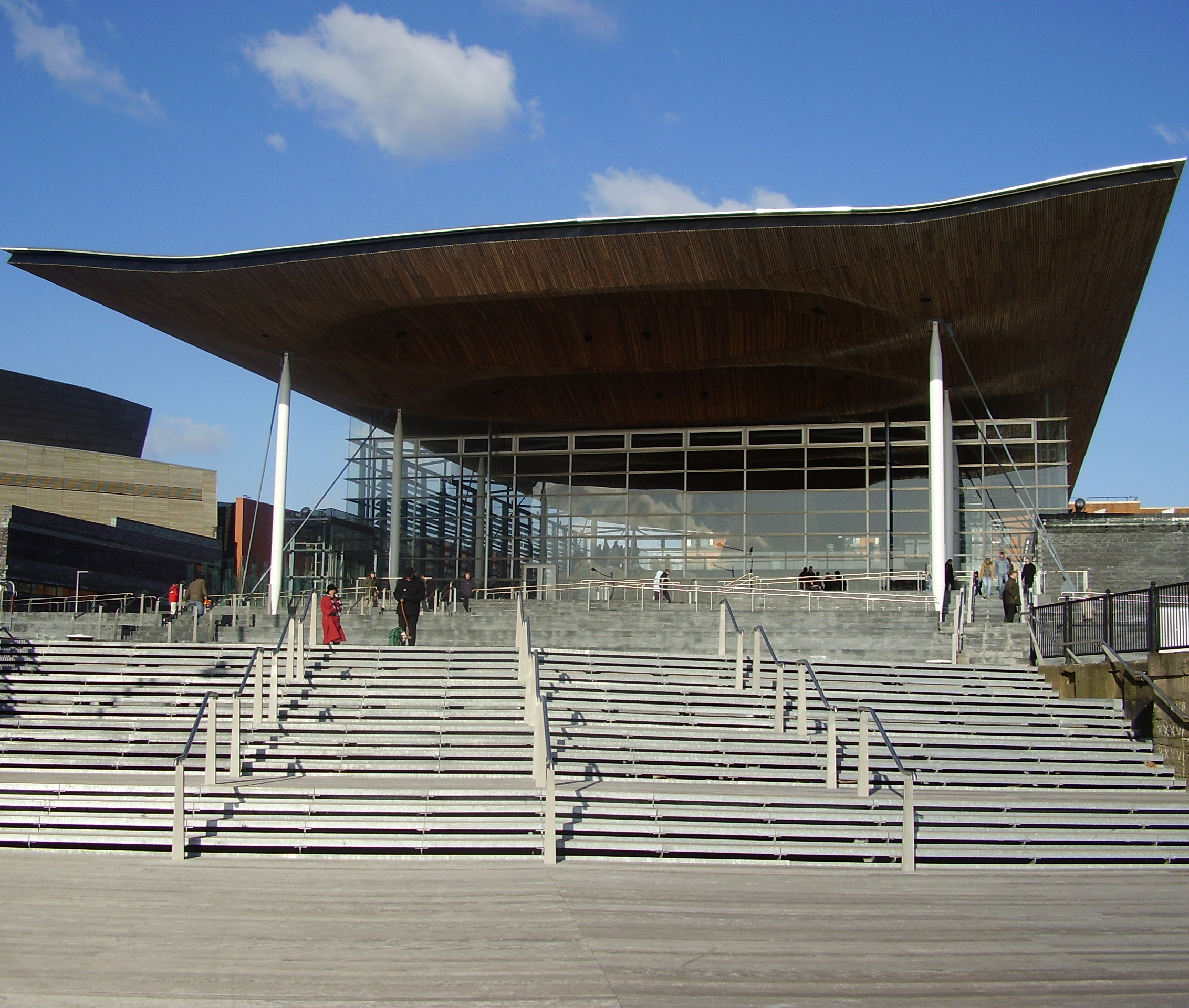
The Senedd designed by the Richard Rogers Partnership for the National Assembly for Wales in Cardiff Bay

Cardiff Bay underwent an urban regeneration scheme in the late 20th century and its Barrage was a major civil engineering project. New buildings of note in this area include:

- The Senedd building, home to Wales' national parliament Senedd Cymru (Richard Rogers, 2006), shortlisted for the RIBA Stirling Prize.
- The Wales Millennium Centre (opened 2004), awarded the Wales Eisteddfod Gold Medal in 2005. – this project was preceded by the Cardiff Bay Opera House scheme which, if built, would have been the first building by Zaha Hadid in the United Kingdom. The building was refused a Lottery grant as one had already been granted to the Millennium Stadium (HOK Sport, 1999).
- 260m 'post modern' facade to the BBC TV Production Centre (2011), by Fashion Architecture Taste.

Cardiff city centre is approximately 1 mile north of Cardiff Bay. Notable modern buildings in the city centre include:

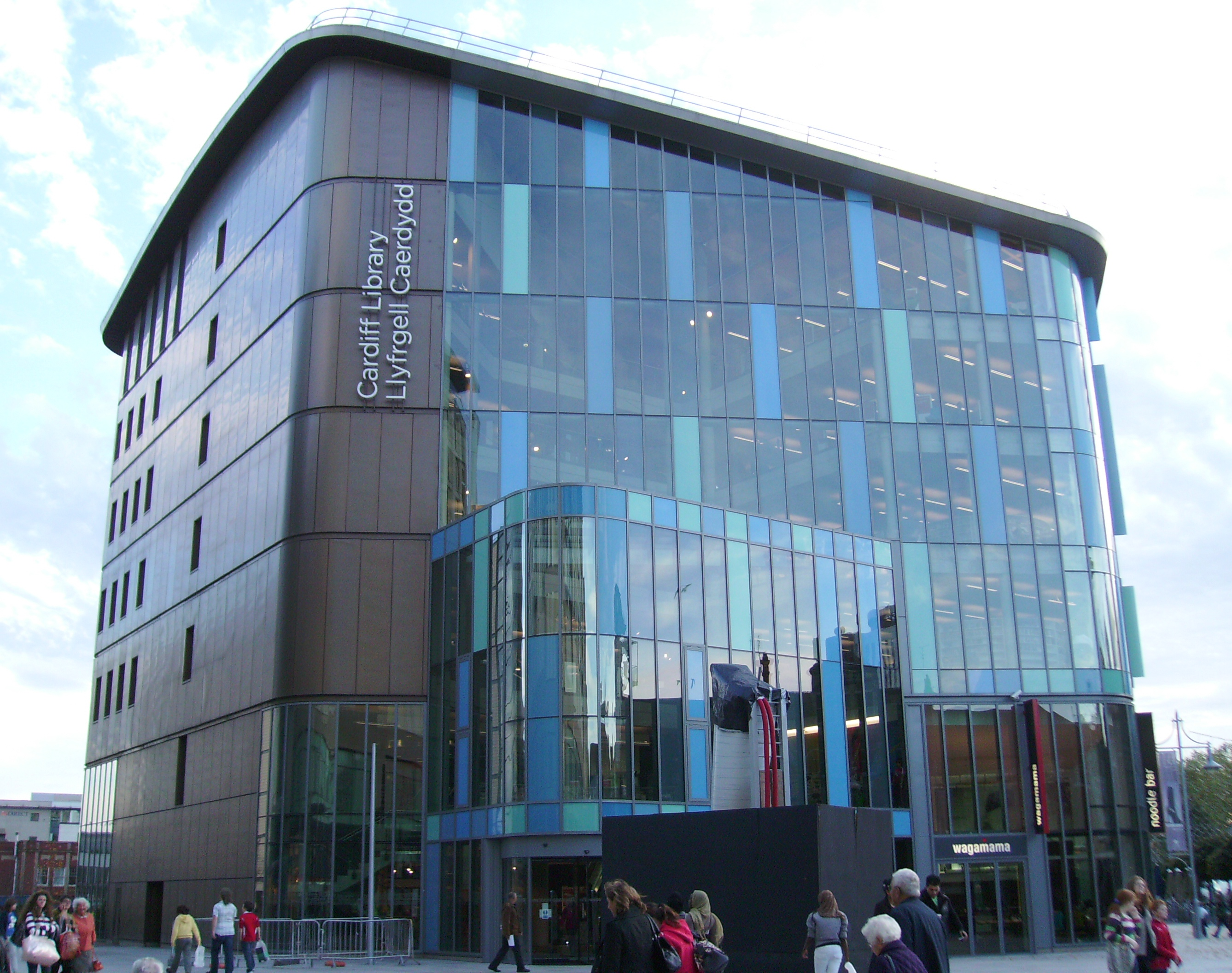
Cardiff Central Library which opened in 2009

- The new Cardiff Central Library (opened in March 2009) is an example of sustainable architecture. The building was specifically designed to be energy-efficient, and includes a sedum grass roof to improve insulation and reduce rainwater run-off, coloured glass panels and solar shading to prevent excessive heat gains, and a full Building Management System to provide climate control to individual floors. As a result of these measures the building was awarded a BREEAM rating of 'excellent'.
- Royal Welsh College of Music & Drama, North Road, completed a £22.5 million redevelopment in 2011. The impressive exterior blends with the nearby Civic Centre and parklands using Portland stone cladding and vertical cedar louvres. The interior contains an art gallery and a new recital hall.

The Cardiff International Sports Village and St David's 2 shopping centre are large leisure complexes underway as of 2009.

== Criticism ==
A number of important buildings have been lost to development in the latter decades of the 20th century. The Institute of Welsh Affairs (IWA) has bemoaned the "frightful" new multi-storey car parks that have replaced key Victorian buildings. For example, the classical old fire station in Westgate Street was replaced by a car park in the 1960s. The white stuccoed Capel Ebenezer was replaced by a superstore and the grand Wood Street Congregational Church was replaced by an office block. The IWA argued for more thought by planners for creative re-use of "our sadly neglected historic town centre buildings".

== See also ==
- Listed buildings in Cardiff
- List of tallest buildings in Cardiff

== Sources ==
- Crook, M. (ed) (1981), The Strange Genius of William Burges: Art-Architect, 1827–1881. National Museum of Wales. ISBN 0720002346.
- Lloyd, Thomas; Orbach, Julian; Scourfield, Robert (2006). Carmarthenshire and Ceredigion: The Buildings of Wales. Yale University Press. ISBN 9780300101799.
- Newman, John (1995), The Buildings of Wales: Glamorgan, Penguin Books.
