= List of tallest buildings in Cardiff =

Tall buildings in Cardiff
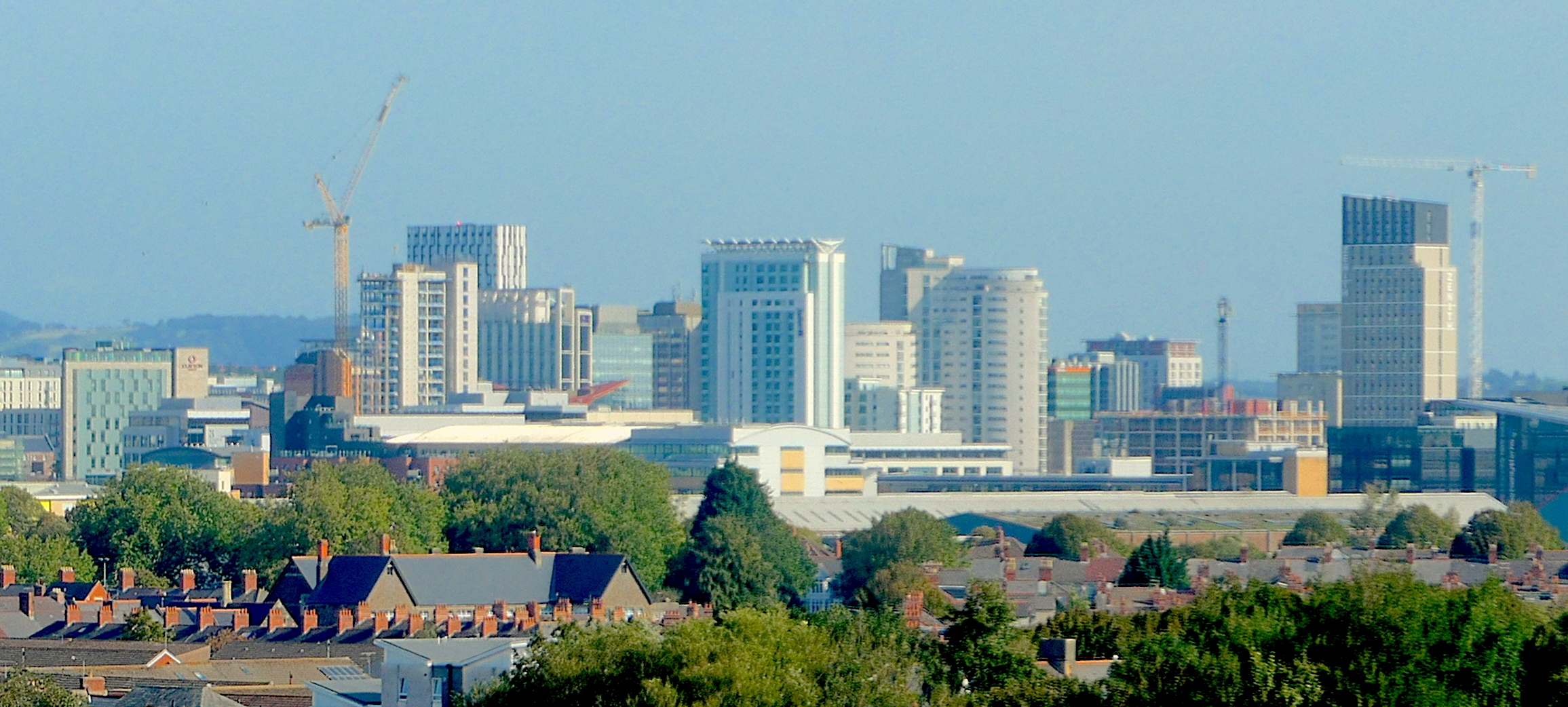
- Cardiff's skyline in 2020
- Tallest building: 1-6 Guildford Crescent (2025)
- Tallest building height: 96 m (315 ft)

Number of tall buildings
- Taller than 50 m (164 ft): 20

This is a list of the tallest buildings in Cardiff that are 42 metres (138 feet) in height and above in the capital of Wales. They include buildings ranging from the ornate civic centre to the historic Cardiff Castle and Llandaff Cathedral.

The city's growth is reflected in its growing skyline. As is the case with many British cities, some of Cardiff's skyline comprises 1960s and 1970s residential and commercial tower blocks. However, current development trends for high-rise buildings include upmarket apartments and office space.

Cardiff is the largest city in Wales and has the most tall buildings in the country. Designed by Rio Architects, the tallest building in Cardiff is Bridge Street Exchange at 85 m (279 ft). It replaced Capital Tower in 2018, which, at 80 m (260 ft), which had been the tallest building in Cardiff since 1970.

Cardiff Council considers a tall building within the city centre and Cardiff Bay to be 8 storeys or more or from 25 m (82 ft) in height. Any proposals to the council for a tall building should "Generally be located within an existing cluster or form part of a proposal to create a new cluster (a cluster can be defined as a group of buildings which form a visual cohesion from more than one viewing point)".

== Completed buildings and structures ==
This lists completed and topped out buildings and structures in Cardiff that are at least 45 metres. This includes spires and architectural details but does not include antenna masts.

Rank	Name	Image	Height (m)	Height (ft)	Floors	Year Completed/Topped Out	Primary Use	Location	Coordinates	Notes
1	Angorfa		96	314	30	2025	Residential	City Centre		Started construction in 2021, topped out in 2025.
2	Tŷ Ambr		90.5	296	29	2025	Mixed use / Residential	Central Quay		Started construction in 2022, topped out in 2025.
3	Principality Stadium		90 (masts)	295 (masts)		1999	Stadium	Stadium Plaza	51.4780°N 3.1825°W	
4	Bridge Street Exchange		85	279	26	2018	Student residential and retail units	City Centre	51.4800°N 3.1725°W	
5	Gramercy Tower, 6 Curran Road		84	275	27	2025	Residential	City Centre		Started construction in 2020, topped out in 2024.
6	Wood Street House		83.5	274	22	2023	Residential and public transport interchange	Central Square	51.4773°N 3.1786°W	
7	Capital Tower		80	262	25	1967	Office and retail units	City Centre	51.4829°N 3.1776°W	From 1967 until 2018, the tallest building in Cardiff to the top of the roof.
8	Stadium House		78 (excluding spire) 125 (including spire)	256 (excluding spire) 410 (including spire)	17	1976 (Renovated 2002)	Office	Stadium Plaza	51.4778°N 3.1806°W	With the communications mast, the structure (added in 2002) is the highest point in Cardiff. The stainless steel mast measures 131 feet (40 m). The lower levels of the building houses the Cardiff Empire Telephone Exchange.
9	Tŷ Copr		76	249	24	2025	Mixed use / Residential	Central Quay		Started construction in 2022, topped out in 2025.
10	Zenith		75 (Note: The Council on Tall Buildings and Urban Habitat estimates that the building is 85 m (279 ft), this is based on a floor count of 25 floors. The estimation has been arrived at by analyzing 8,693 other buildings of the same Residential function on this database that do have confirmed heights. The user should be aware that non-standard features, such as significant spires or raised entrances / podiums, may affect the accuracy of this estimation.)	246	26	2019	Student residential	Capital Quarter	51.4764°N 3.1715°W	
10	The Copper Works (Y Gwaith Copr)		75	246	23	2023	Residential	Capital Quarter	51.4767°N 3.1709°W	
11	Altolusso		72	236	23	2005	Residential	City Centre	51.4775°N 3.1725°W	
12	Tŷ Pont Haearn		63	207	21	2005	Student residential and lower multi-storey car park	City Centre	51.4780°N 3.1725°W	
12	Meridian Gate		63	207	21	2009	Hotel	City Centre	51.4768°N 3.1737°W	
13	Tŷ Admiral		61	203	14	2015	Office and retail units	City Centre	51.4795°N 3.1728°W	Not to be confused with Admiral House. Designed by Glenn Howells Architects at a cost of £58 million.
13	Premier Inn (Stadium) Hotel		61	200	18	2023	Hotel / restaurants	City Centre	51.4763°N 3.1755°W	
14	Holland House		60.3	198	15	1968 (Renovated 2004)	Hotel (former office)	Newport Road	51.4836°N 3.1672°W	
15	Llandaff Cathedral		59.40	195		1290	Religion	Llandaff	51.4958°N 3.2180°W	Until 1967, the tallest building in Cardiff to the top of the spire.
16	City Hall Clock Tower		59	194		1905	Civic building	Cathays Park	51.4850°N 3.1792°W	
17	Tŷ William Morgan		58 (approx)	190	12	2020	Office	Central Square	51.4776°N 3.1801°W	UK Government Regional Hub and offices of HMRC. Named after the bible translator William Morgan (1545–1604).
17	Helmont House		58	190	12	1984	Office / Hotel	Canal Quarter	51.4810°N 3.1713°W	
17	Brunel House		58	190	16	1974	Office and retail units	Newport Road	51.4823°N 3.1698°W	Originally called Great Western House, headquarters for the Western Region of British Rail.
18	Pendeen House		56	184	19	2014	Residential	Ferry Court, Cardiff Bay	51.45365°N 3.1768°W	
19	Vita Student, 11 Park Place		55.2	181	18	2022	Student residential	Park Place	51.4841°N 3.1749°W	
20	Admiral House		55	180	16	2006 (Renovated)	Residential	Newport Road	51.4842°N 3.1656°W	Not to be confused with Tŷ Admiral
21	Anchor Works		52	170	15	2024	Residential	Dumballs Road		Started construction in 2021, topped out in 2024.
22	Landmark Place		51	167	17	2004	Residential and retail units	Canal Quarter	51.4815°N 3.1713°W	
23	Verse, 47–53 Charles Street		50.5	165	16	2023	Residential	City Centre	51.4803°N 3.1729°W	
24	Cardiff University Tower Building		50	164	12		University	Cathays Park	51.4888°N 3.1808°W	
25	Vega House, Celestia		48	158		2007	Residential	Cardiff Bay	51.4643°N 3.1590°W	
25	Southgate House		48	157	13	1978	Office / Retail	Central Square	51.4778°N 3.1792°W	
29	Loudoun House		47	154	16	1964	Residential	Butetown	51.4699°N 3.1703°W	
29	Nelson House		47	154	16	1964	Residential	Butetown	51.4701°N 3.1709°W	
30	ISIS 3D		46	151	15	2007	Residential	Century Wharf	51.4675°N 3.1747°W	
30	Eastgate House		46	151	14	1969	Office	Newport Road	51.4851°N 3.1658°W	
30	McKenzie House		46	151	12		University	Newport Road	51.4840°N 3.1661°W	Previously known as NPI House
30	St Andrews United Reformed Church		46	150		1900	Church	Roath	51.4960°N 3.1645°W	
31	Brains Brewery Chimney		45.7	150		1938	Chimney	Central Quay		
32	The Aspect		45	148	15	1960s, renovated 2002	Residential and retail units	City Centre	51.4827°N 3.1710°W	Converted office block (Fanum House) with 2 additional storeys added in 2002.
32	Strata		45	148	15	2009	Residential	Century Wharf	51.4681°N 3.1761°W	
32	The Neighbourhood		45	148	11		Residential and retail units	Newport Road	51.4860°N 3.1662°W	Former City Road campus of Coleg Glan Hafren, converted in 2016 into a student accommodation and a coffee shop.
33	Marriott Hotel		43	141	12	1986	Hotel and restaurant	Mill Lane	51.4771°N 3.1752°W	
34	Channel View Flats		42	138	14	1965	Residential	Grangetown	51.4582°N 3.1824°W	
35	Cardiff Castle Clock Tower		40	131		1873	Monument	Castle Quarter	51.4813°N 3.182°W	
35	St John the Baptist Church		40	131		circa 1490	Church	The Hayes	51.4807°N 3.1783°W	

== Buildings under construction or approved ==
Height figures are rounded to the nearest metre.

=== Under construction ===
This lists buildings that are under construction in Cardiff and are planned to rise at least 40 metres. Under construction buildings that have already been topped out are listed above.

Rank	Name	Image	Height (m)	Floors	Year Construction Began	Primary Use	Location	Coordinates	Notes
1	Cardiff Sixth Form Boarding Hub			18	Approved 2023, under construction 2024	Student accommodation			

=== Approved ===
This lists buildings that have been approved for, but are yet to start, construction in Cardiff (over 40 m).

Rank	Name	Image	Height (m)	Height (ft)	Floors	Year Approved	Primary use	Location	Coordinates	Notes
1	5 Central Square		178	584	49	2026	Residential	Central Square		Image shows the approximate plot of land (showing 2 Central Square under construction)
2	Y 400		102	339	33	2026	Residential	City Centre		Image taken from the site of Y 400 (showing the John Lewis store on the right, and the Golden Cross pub on the left)
3	Harlech Court				35		Residential	Bute Terrace		Image shows the former Harlech Court being demolished on the site
4	John Street Tower (John Street - North)		99	324		2018	Mixed use			
4	Hallinans House		99	324	32	2017	Mixed use	Newport Road		Image shows current building
5	Friary House				Up to 28	2024	Mixed use	City Centre		Image shows current building
6	The Embankment			25			Residential	Dumballs Road		Image shows current building
7	Longcross Court			18		2024	Student accommodation	Newport Road		Image shows current building

== Demolished ==
Rank	Name	Image	Height (m)	Height (ft)	Floors	Year Constructed	Year Demolished	Primary Use	Location	Coordinates	Notes
1	Phase 2, Government Buildings, Tŷ Glas		73	239	18	1969	2024	HMRC offices	Llanishen	51.5267°N 3.1982°W	
2	Gleider House, Phase 1 Government Buildings, Tŷ Glas		44.50	146	11	1968	2024	HMRC and Tenovus offices	Llanishen	51.5276°N 3.1966°W	

== See also ==
- Cardiff city centre
- Architecture of Cardiff
