= Bridge Street Exchange =

High-rise building in Cardiff, Wales

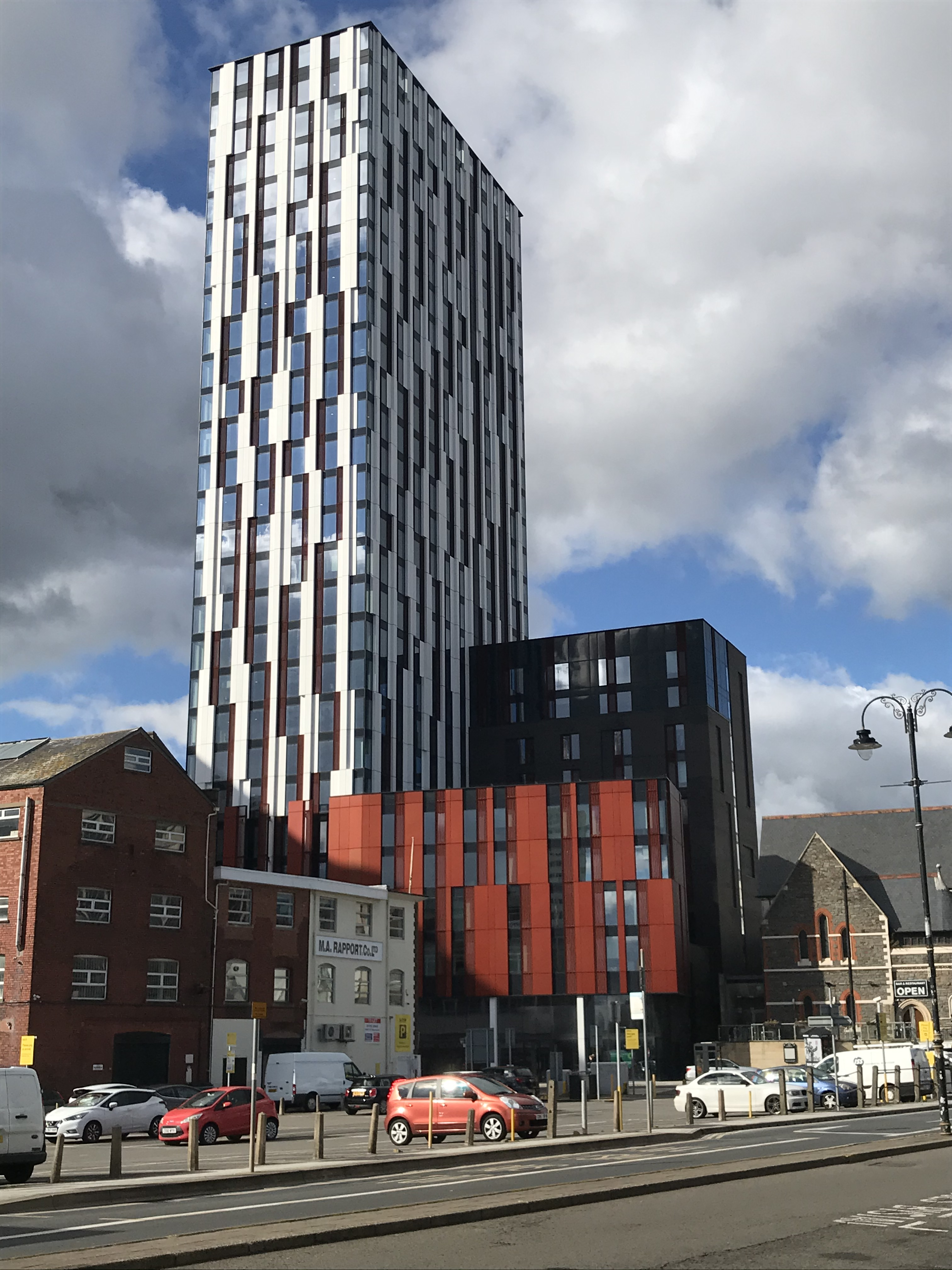
- Bridge Street Exchange in March 2020 with the 11 and 5-storey blocks to the right
- Alternative names: 71 and 71A Bridge Street

General information
- Status: Completed
- Location: 71 Bridge Street, Cardiff, Wales, United Kingdom
- Coordinates: 51.4801°N 3.1725°W
- Construction started: 5 September 2016
- Topped-out: 25 April 2018
- Completed: 31 August 2018
- Cost: £36,669,000
- Landlord: Privilege Cardiff S.à r.l.

Height
- Roof: 85 m (279 ft)

Technical details
- Floor count: 26

Design and construction
- Architect: Rio Architects Ltd
- Structural engineer: Clarkebond (UK) Ltd
- Main contractor: Watkins Jones Group Ltd

Website
- bridgestreet-exchange.com

Bridge Street Exchange is a 26-storey high-rise building in Cardiff, Wales, with conjoining 11 and 5-storey blocks. At 85 m (279 ft) in height, it is the tallest building in Cardiff, and is a mixed-use development accommodating approximately 477 students with retail units on the ground floor. It is located on the eastern corner of the junction between Bridge Street and Charles Street.

== History of the site ==
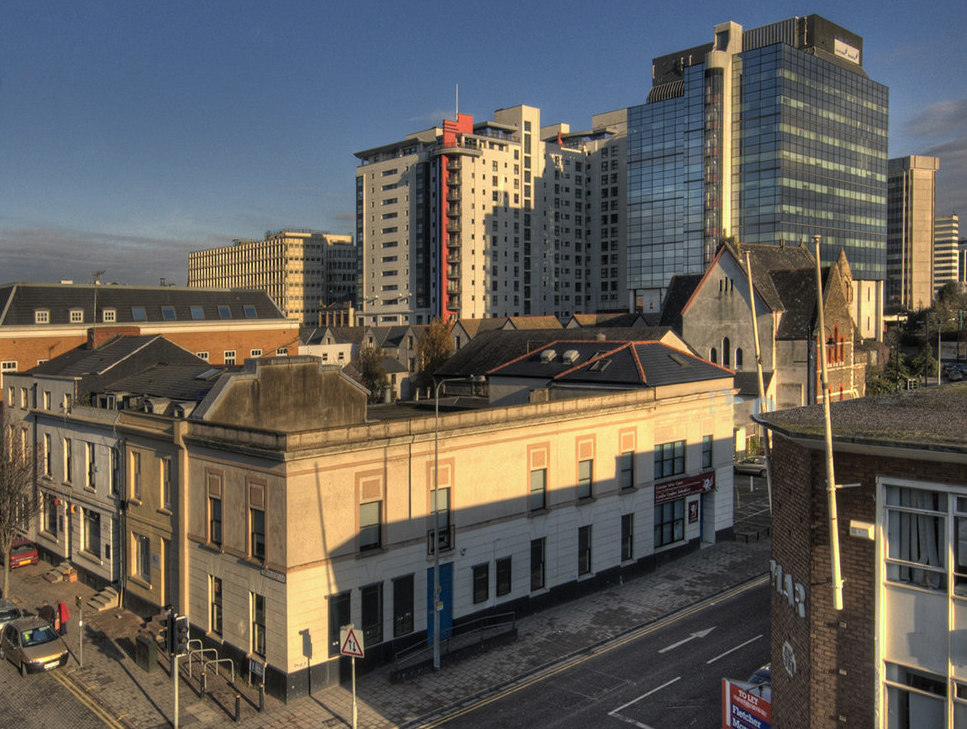
The original building (lower half of image) before it was demolished

Charles Street was originally an area of private housing leading from Crockherbtown to Bridge Street; now no residential properties remain in the area. 71 Bridge Street is within a Conservation Area, which is an area designated by Cardiff Council as an area of special architectural or historic interest. The original building was built in 1984 and Cardiff Council said that it held "no historic significance and of little aesthetic value due to the inconsistent fenestration details and lack of presence at this prominent corner location". Half of the site was already cleared and the remainder was undeveloped for more than 10 years.

Planning permission was originally granted by Cardiff Council in 2008 for a 5-storey hostel and ground floor retail space and for a 5-storey office development with ground floor retail space. Neither were implemented, and the planning permission subsequently lapsed. The building was first proposed on 16 December 2015, when a planning application was made for a 24-storey block of student flats. Full planning permission was granted on 20 April 2016.

Construction of Bridge Street Exchange

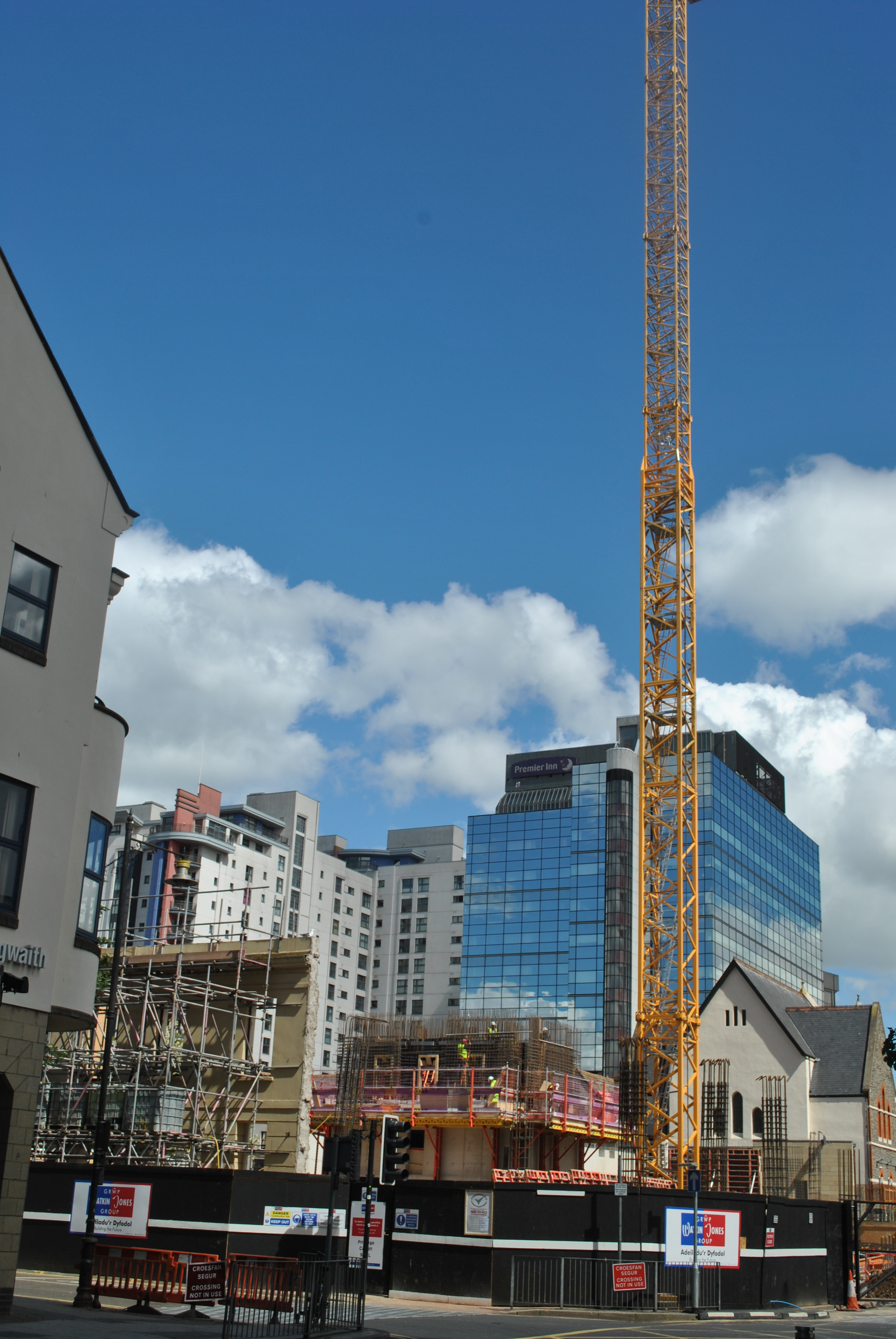
April 2017

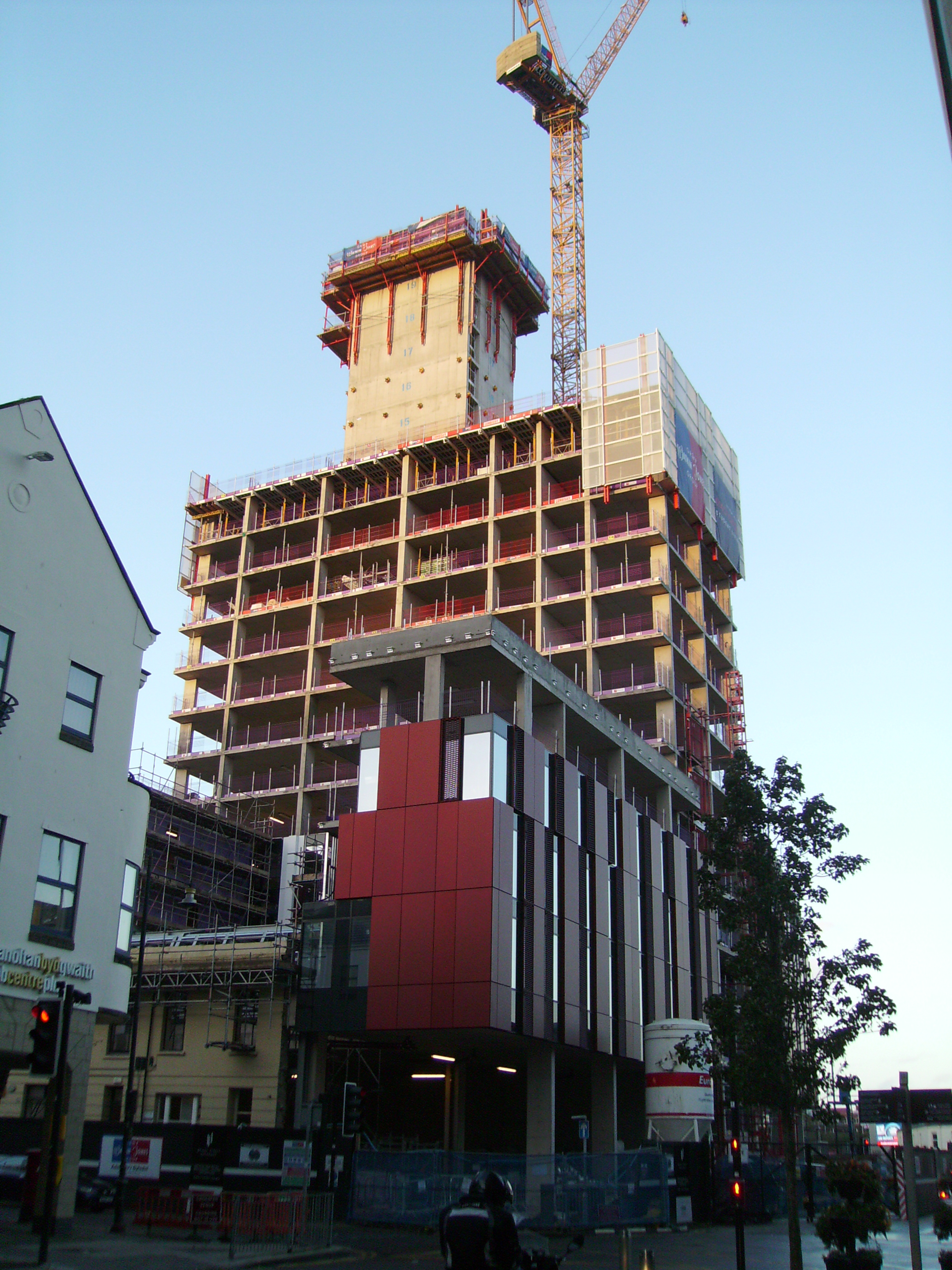
October 2017

The building was constructed by the Watkins Jones Group of Bangor in north Wales between 5 September 2016 and 31 August 2018. It was designed by Rio Architects of Cardiff. The associated archaeological work was undertaken by Rubicon Heritage Services. The Bridge Street Exchange is the tallest building in Cardiff, beating the previous record holder of Capital Tower, which had held the record since 1970.

== Location ==
The building is bounded to the north by Wesley Lane, to the south by Bridge Street and to the west by Charles Street. The address was previously at 71 and 71a Bridge Street.

== Objections ==
The building obtained planning permission on 20 April 2016, despite an objection from Cathays councillor Elizabeth Clark, who said the building would be "completely out of scale to the nearby buildings and the design jars with the historic area"; she added, "currently, the nearest high rise building is Ty Admiral which is 55m-61m high."

== See also ==
- List of tallest buildings in Cardiff
