= Helmont House =

Hotel and office building in Cardiff, Wales

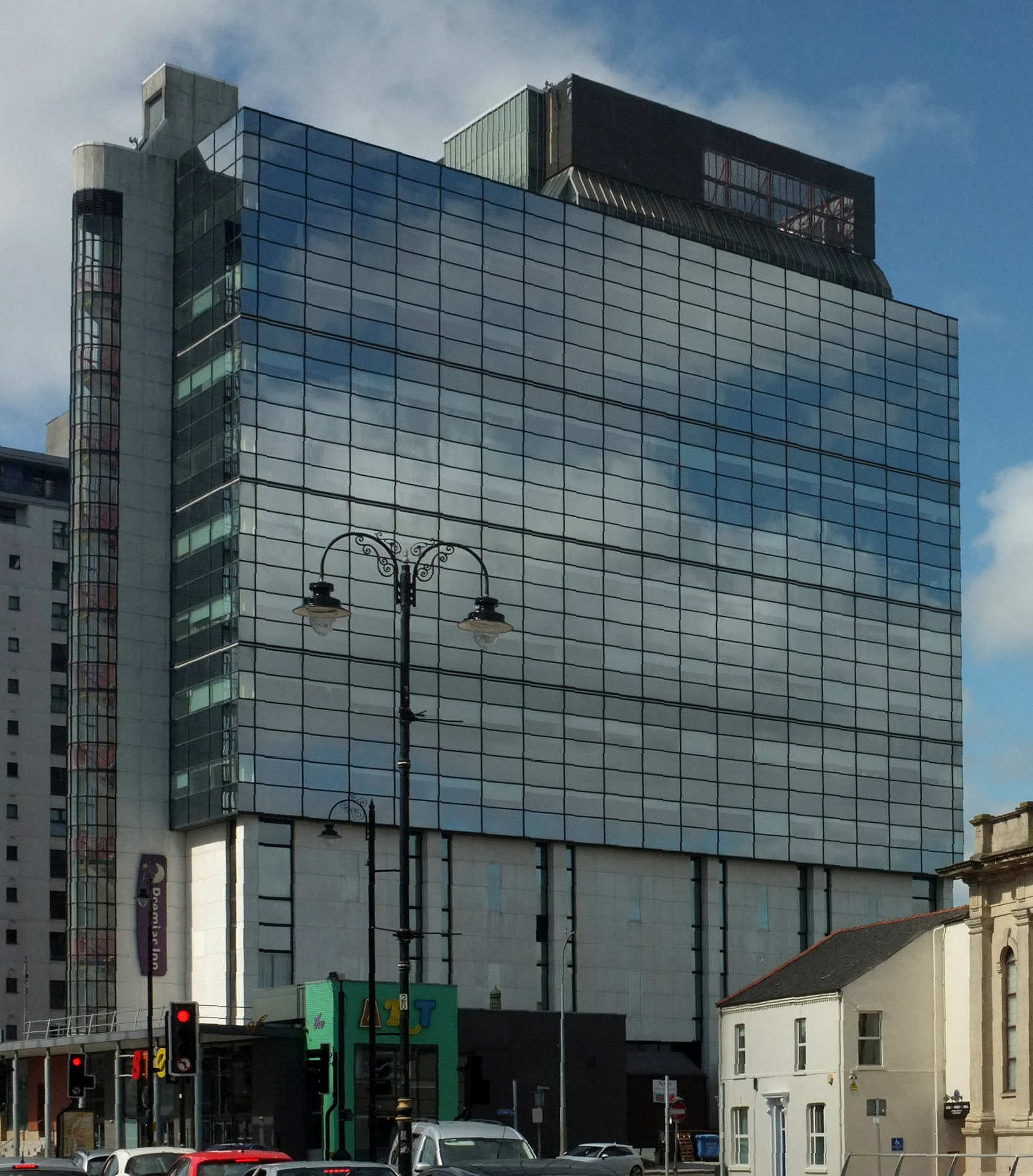
- Helmont House
- Interactive map of the Helmont House area

General information
- Type: Hotel and Offices
- Location: Cardiff, Wales, Churchill Way, Cardiff city centre CF10 2NB
- Coordinates: 51.481°N 3.171°W
- Current tenants: Premier Inn; Meltwater Group; NewLaw Legal Ltd T/A NewLaw Solicitors; Quote Exchange Ltd; Horwich Farrelly Solicitors, Cardiff.
- Completed: 1984
- Owner: Rightacres

Height
- Height: 58 metres (190 ft)

Technical details
- Floor count: 12
- Floor area: 155,000 sq ft (14,400 m^{2})

Helmont House is a high-rise hotel and office building in Cardiff, Wales. Completed in 1984, the 58-metre-high (190 ft) building has 12 floors and is the 15th-tallest building in Cardiff. The building was renovated in 2009 into a 200-room Premier Inn hotel.

The building was previously occupied by British Gas and was one of the largest office buildings in Cardiff, and is yards away from Cardiff Queen Street railway station.

== History ==
When British Gas was privatised in 1986, fewer than 600 people were employed in the Cardiff office. In 1998 the Cardiff regional headquarters became the National Sales Centre for Britain. Prior to relocation, 2,400 people were employed at Helmont House, two thirds of which were call centre staff, with a further 800 working in the field.

In 2009 British Gas relocated its Wales headquarters to a new 70,000-square-foot (6,500 m^{2}) office site at the nearby Callaghan Square, in the south of Cardiff city centre. Helmont House was acquired by the property company Rightacres when the building's value was estimated at over £10m. Rightacres had previously acquired Holland House in Cardiff from Lloyds TSB, which was converted into a Mercure Hotel.

The building was renovated in 2009 into a 200-room Premier Inn hotel on a 25-year lease after a wide range search by the company for a location in central Cardiff. The hotel was the largest in the city in terms of beds.

Sixty thousand square feet (5,600 m^{2}) of Helmont House remains dedicated to office space, 45,000 sq ft (4,200 m^{2}) of which is let to law firm NewLaw Solicitors.

The building featured in episodes of the television programmes Doctor Who ("Partners in Crime") and Torchwood in 2007. Both series are filmed and produced in Cardiff.

== Architecture ==
The angular look of Helmont House was inspired by the Cubist art movement which was dominated by artists Pablo Picasso and Georges Braque.

== Location ==
Helmont House is in close proximity to the main shopping areas including Queen Street and St David's. Cardiff Queen Street railway station is within a short walk, as are the Cardiff Central Bus and Railway Stations. The building is one of the closest hotels to the Cardiff International Arena.

== See also ==
- List of tallest buildings in Cardiff
