= Eastgate House =

Eastgate House may refer to:

- Eastgate House, Rochester, a Grade I listed house in Rochester, Kent
- Eastgate House, Cardiff, a high-rise office building in Cardiff
- Eastgate House, Eastgate, a Grade II listed house in Bourne, Lincolnshire
