= Cardiff Marriott Hotel =

Hotel in Cardiff, Wales

Cardiff Marriott
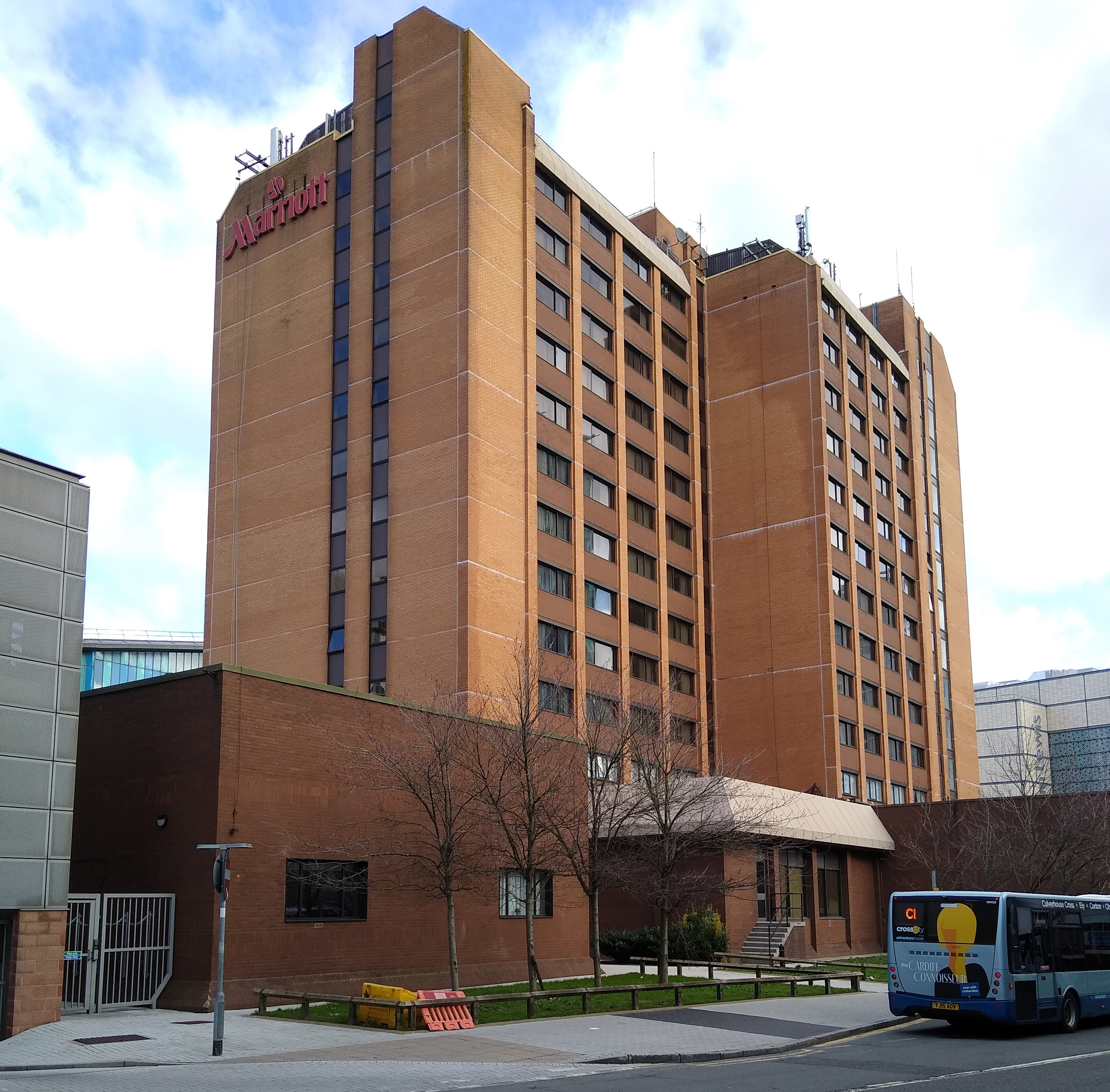

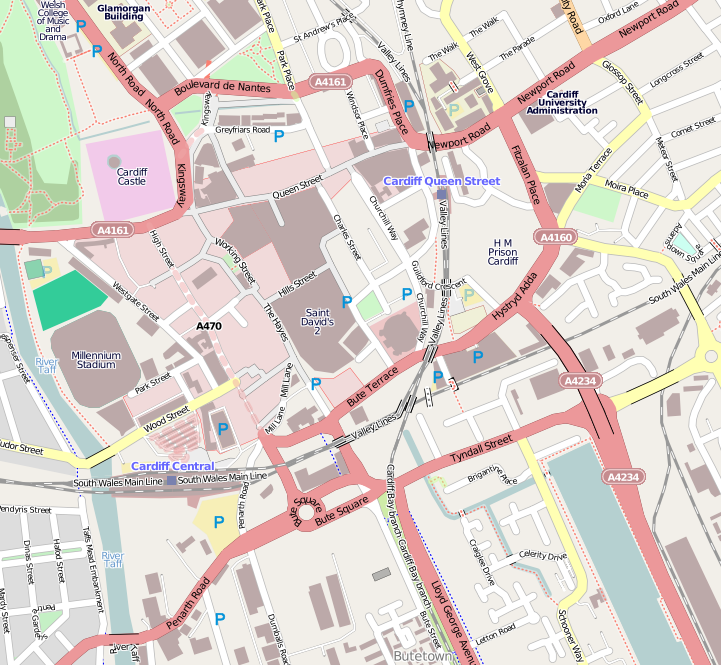
- Location within Central Cardiff

General information
- Location: Mill Lane, Cardiff, Wales, United Kingdom
- Coordinates: 51°28′37.6″N 3°10′30″W
- Operator: Marriott Hotels & Resorts

Technical details
- Floor count: 10

Other information
- Number of rooms: 181
- Number of restaurants: 1

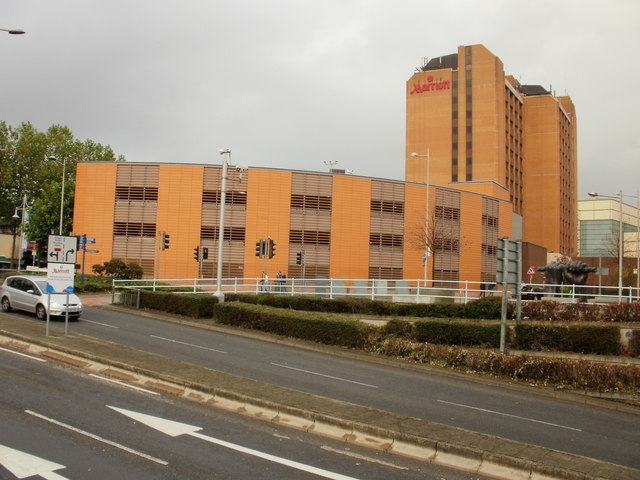
Marriott Hotel including the multi-storey car park

Cardiff Marriott Hotel is a four star Marriott hotel in the southern part of The Hayes in the centre of Cardiff, capital of Wales. It is located in close proximity to Cardiff Central Library and St. David's Hall.

The hotel was officially opened by Princess Margaret in 1986 as a Holiday Inn, owned by Canada-based Scott's Hotels. It was renamed the Cardiff Marriott in 1992. It was sold to Whitbread Hotels in 1995 and then sold again in 2005. The hotel underwent refurbishment in 2008, which included a new multi-storey car park, because part of the hotel car park was sold to make way for a new Cardiff Central Library as part of the St. David's 2 development.

== See also ==
- List of tallest buildings in Cardiff
