= Tŷ Pont Haearn =

Residential building in Cardiff, Wales

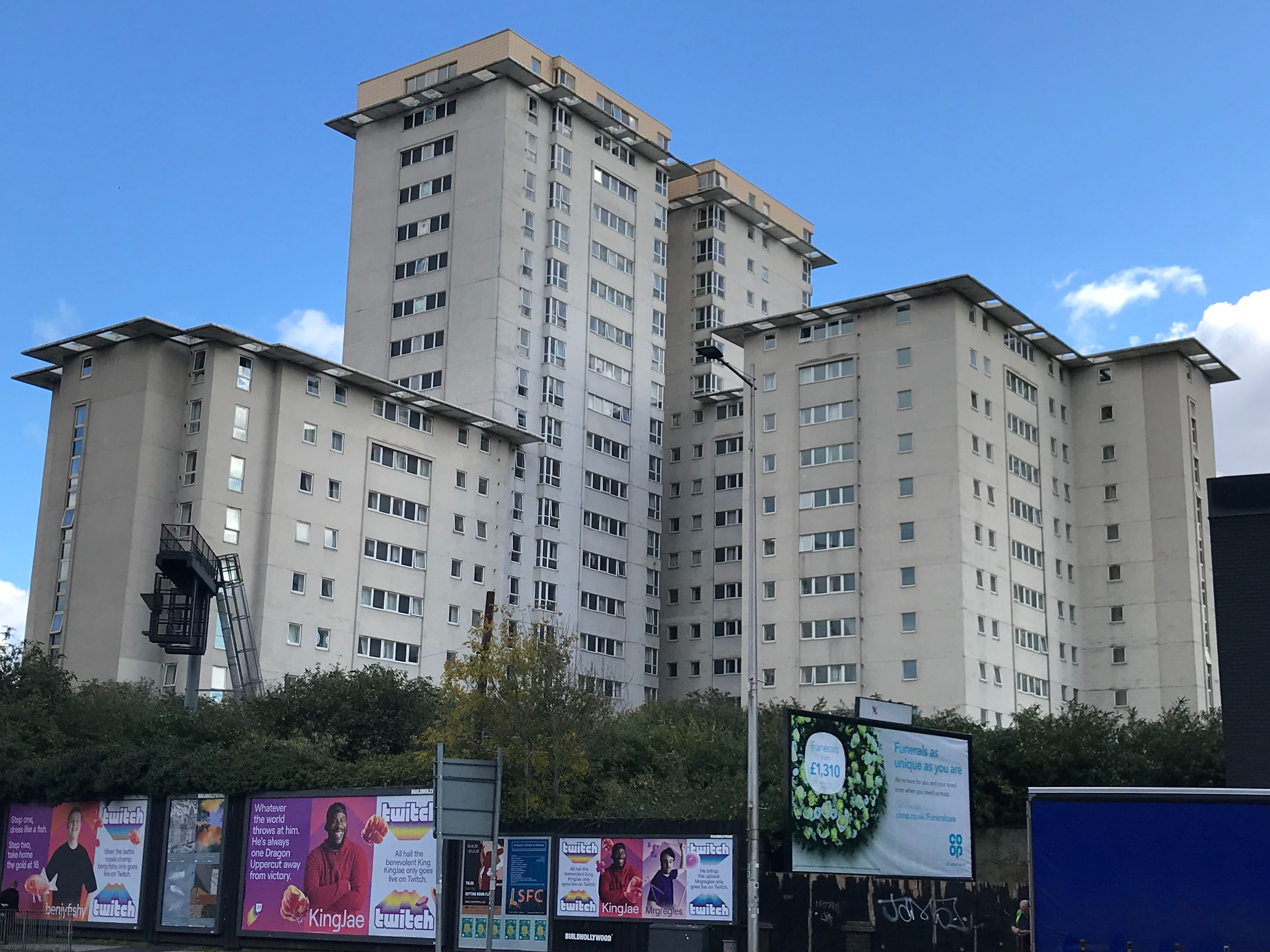
- Tŷ Pont Haearn
- Interactive map of the Tŷ Pont Haearn area

General information
- Type: Residential
- Location: Cardiff, Wales, Pellett Street, Cardiff city centre
- Coordinates: 51.4778°N 3.1702°W
- Current tenants: Unite Students; NCP
- Construction started: March 2004
- Completed: September 2005
- Cost: £19.7 million
- Owner: UNITE Group

Height
- Height: 63 metres

Technical details
- Floor count: 21

Design and construction
- Architect: Wigley Fox Partnership
- Civil engineer: Faber Maunsell
- Other designers: Baris
- Main contractor: Carillion

Tŷ Pont Haearn (meaning: 'Iron Bridge House'), formerly also known as Liberty Bridge, is a residential building and is also seventh tallest building in Cardiff, Wales. The building is currently managed by Unite Students.

The 21-storey building comprises 17 floors of 144 student flats on top of a four-storey public car park.

== Construction ==
The building was proposed in 2003. Construction began in 2004 and was completed in September 2005.

=== Site ===
The site was formerly a cold storage facility demolished into the basement of the building and capped as a surface car park, which meant Carillion had to undertake extensive groundworks prior to construction. The project was rendered more complex by its restricted city-centre location on a triangular site, with two sides bound by live railways and very narrow access via Pellett Street.

=== Structure design ===
The building has a piled structure and was constructed using traditional building techniques. UNITE sometimes uses modular construction methods on their projects, but this was unsuitable here due to the tight site constraints. The high-rise building has a repetitive design which meant the team became increasingly efficient at the process as the project progressed.

=== Drywall ===
During construction, subcontractor Baris installed 50,000 m^{2} of Knauf plasterboard and systems throughout. Up to 90% of the available wall space throughout Tŷ Pont Haearn has been fitted with 12.5 mm and 15 mm Soundshield fixed to 70mm 'C’-Studs and high performance Twin Frame Partitions to enhance sound reduction values. 12.5 mm Moistureshield is in place throughout all the wet areas of the building, providing protection in internal areas of high humidity, with Shaftwall used for the stairwells and lift shafts.

=== Completion ===
On-time delivery of the project was achieved allowing the client to move in the students in time for the new academic year as planned. Handover took place on a Friday night and the students began moving in on Saturday, two days earlier than the scheduled Monday move-in date.

== Accommodation ==
Owned by Unite Students (Previously Liberty Living), Tŷ Pont Haern accommodates 642 students in 144 flats, each with a communal kitchen. The bedrooms are situated in apartments or clusters of three, four, five or six beds and there are also several larger premium bedrooms. 629 students are housed in single study bedrooms and 14 in studio apartments. All rooms include an en-suite shower, toilet and washbasin plus data points for high-speed Internet access. All study bedrooms share a fully fitted kitchen and living area.

Tŷ Pont Haearn is staffed with an on-site management and maintenance team, along with 24-hour security including a CCTV system monitoring the site, electronic entry systems to access the residence plus a staffed reception area 24-hours a day. The residence also provides wheelchair access, a communal living area with Internet access and vending machine, an on-site laundry facility and bike storage.

== Location ==
Tŷ Pont Haearn is in close proximity to higher educational establishments including Cardiff University and Cardiff Metropolitan University. Located on Pellett Street in the heart of the city centre, the residence is close to Cardiff Central railway station. and Cardiff International Arena. The residence is accessible from Junction 29 (Cardiff South) of the M4 motorway.

== See also ==
- List of tallest buildings in Cardiff
