= Eastgate House, Cardiff =

Office building in Cardiff, Wales

Coordinates: 51°29′6″N 3°9′56″W

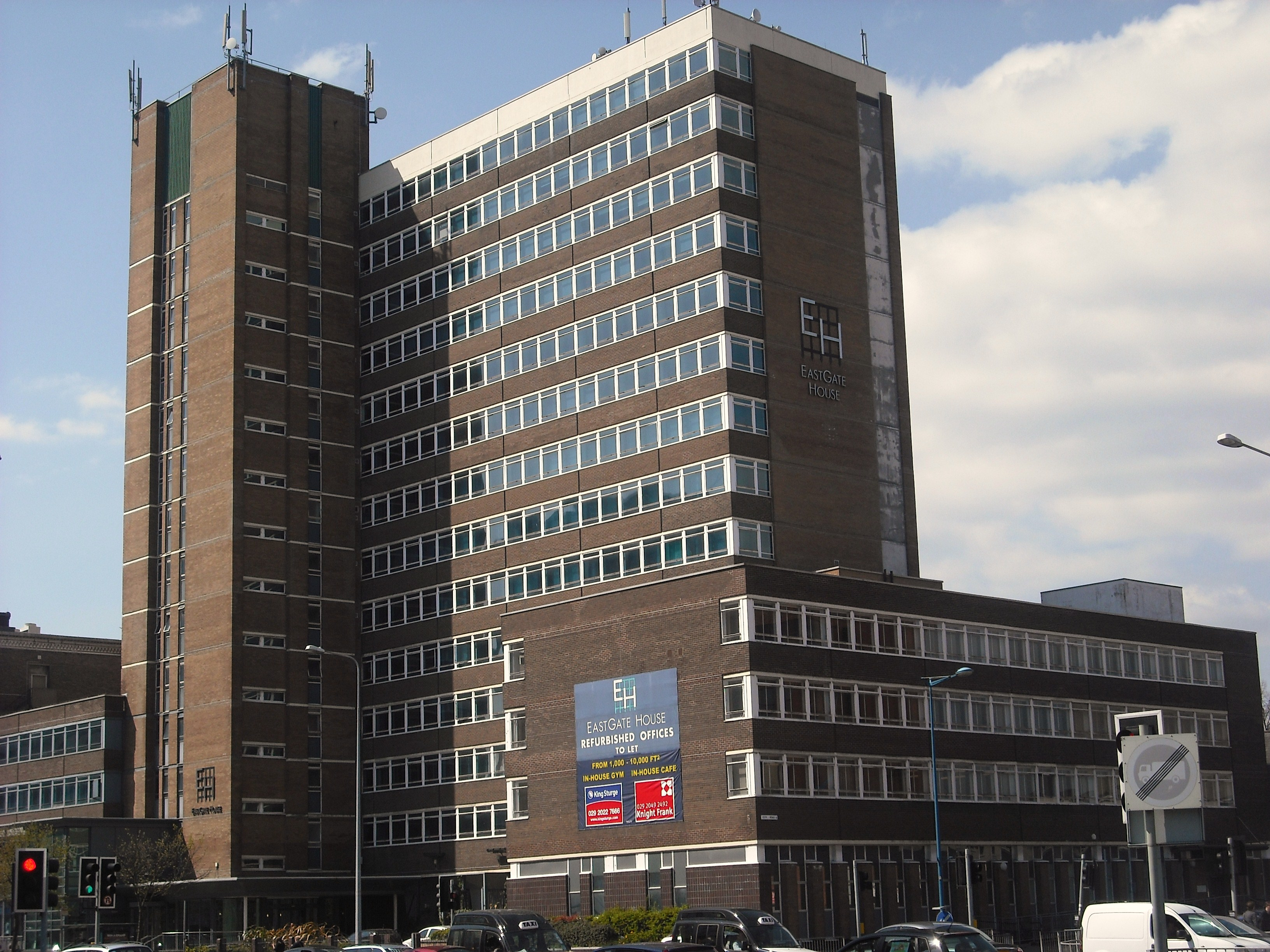
Eastgate House

Eastgate House (also known as Heron House) is a high-rise office building on the corner of Newport Road and City Road, Cardiff, Wales, next to Longcross Court and near Holland House. It was built in 1969 and is 46 metres (151 ft) high, with 14 floors. It is (or has been) occupied by the Wales Office, Department for Work and Pensions, Cardiff University, Newsco Insider, Biofusion Plc, BPP Professional, Asthma UK and Randstad NV. The office building contains 3 elevators and has parking space for 40 cars.

Eastgate House was purchased in 2015 by private equity firm Maya Capital, for £7 million.
