= Newport Road =

Major road in Cardiff, Wales

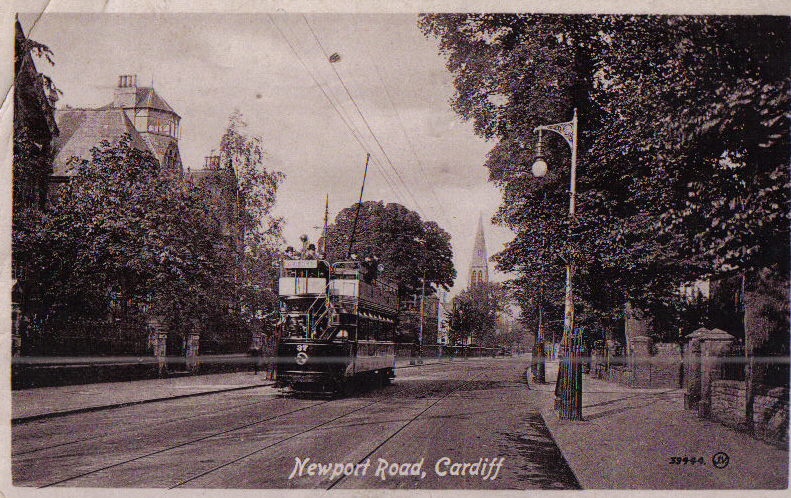
Tram on Newport Road c. 1912

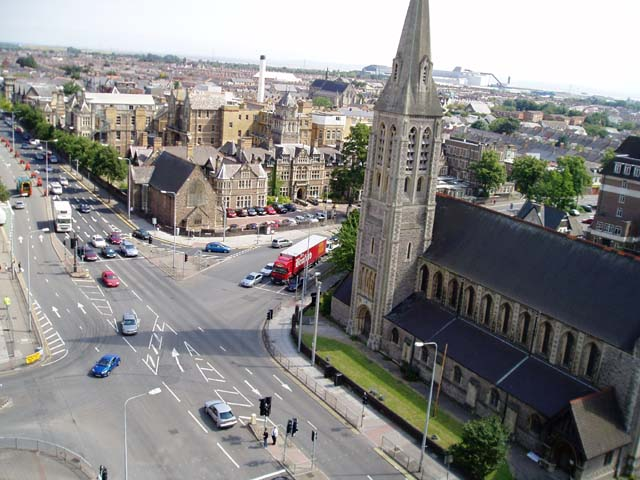
View looking onto St James Church and CRI, from Eastgate House

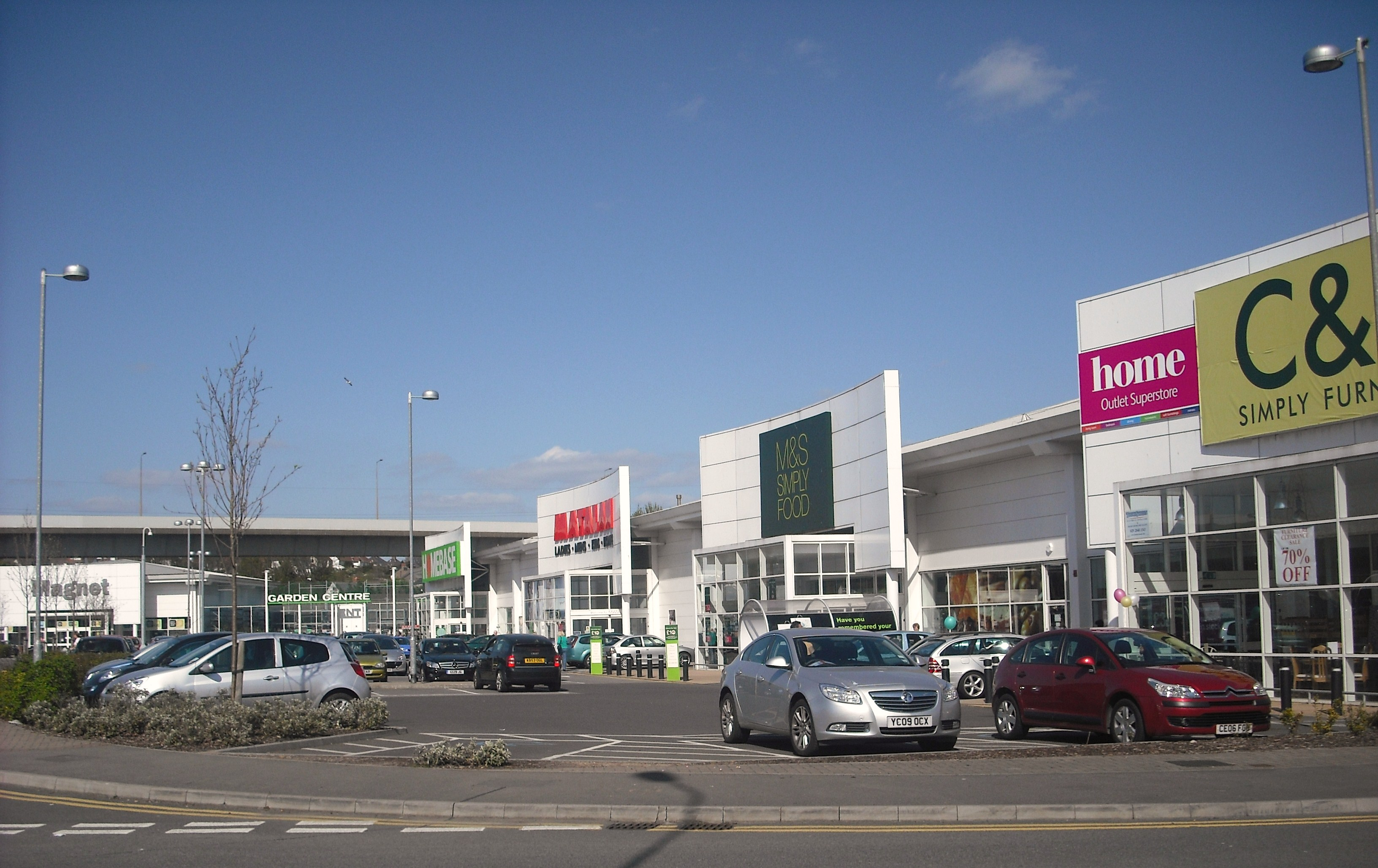
Retail Park, Penylan/Rumney

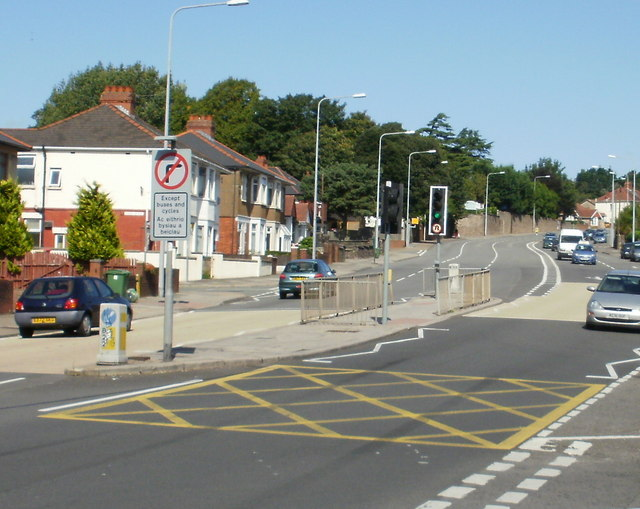
Newport Road on Rumney Hill

Newport Road is a 4.7 mi (7.5 km) road leading east from the centre of Cardiff, Wales, towards Newport, until it joins the A48 at St Mellons.

== Description ==
Newport Road follows the route of the A4161 through Roath and the B4487 through Rumney, Llanrumney and St Mellons. Until 1971 Newport Road was part of the main A48 route through South Wales (via Cardiff city centre). On 19 November 1971 the route was renumbered when the A48 was re-routed along the Eastern Avenue dual carriageway to the north.

Notable landmarks on Newport Road include the Cardiff Royal Infirmary (CRI), built in 1884. Between 1883 and 1909 the University College of South Wales and Monmouthshire (later Cardiff University) was founded and based on Newport Road. The stretch between Cardiff city centre and the CRI is now dominated by high-rise buildings and office blocks, including Eastgate House, Holland House and offices used as the headquarters of South Glamorgan County Council until 1986.

The stretch beyond the old city limits and before Rumney Hill is dominated by out of town shopping parks, such as the Avenue Retail Park and City Link Retail Park.

== Recent events ==
In 2012 (following a 2002 report which measured nitrogen oxide above safety levels) the area of Newport Road around the CRI became one of three Air Quality Management Areas in the city.

In 2014 Newport Road laid claim to the most prolific speed camera in Britain. The camera, at the junction of Newport Road and Colchester Avenue caught 13,624 speeding car drivers in the first six months of the year, possibly raising £800,000 in fines. That stretch of Newport Road had approximately 1600 vehicles passing along it each day.

In 2019, the road was closed for filming the science fiction movie Infinite starring Mark Wahlberg, using it as a street in New York City.h
