= Capital Tower, Cardiff =

Building in Cardiff, Wales

Coordinates: 51°28′59″N 3°10′39″W

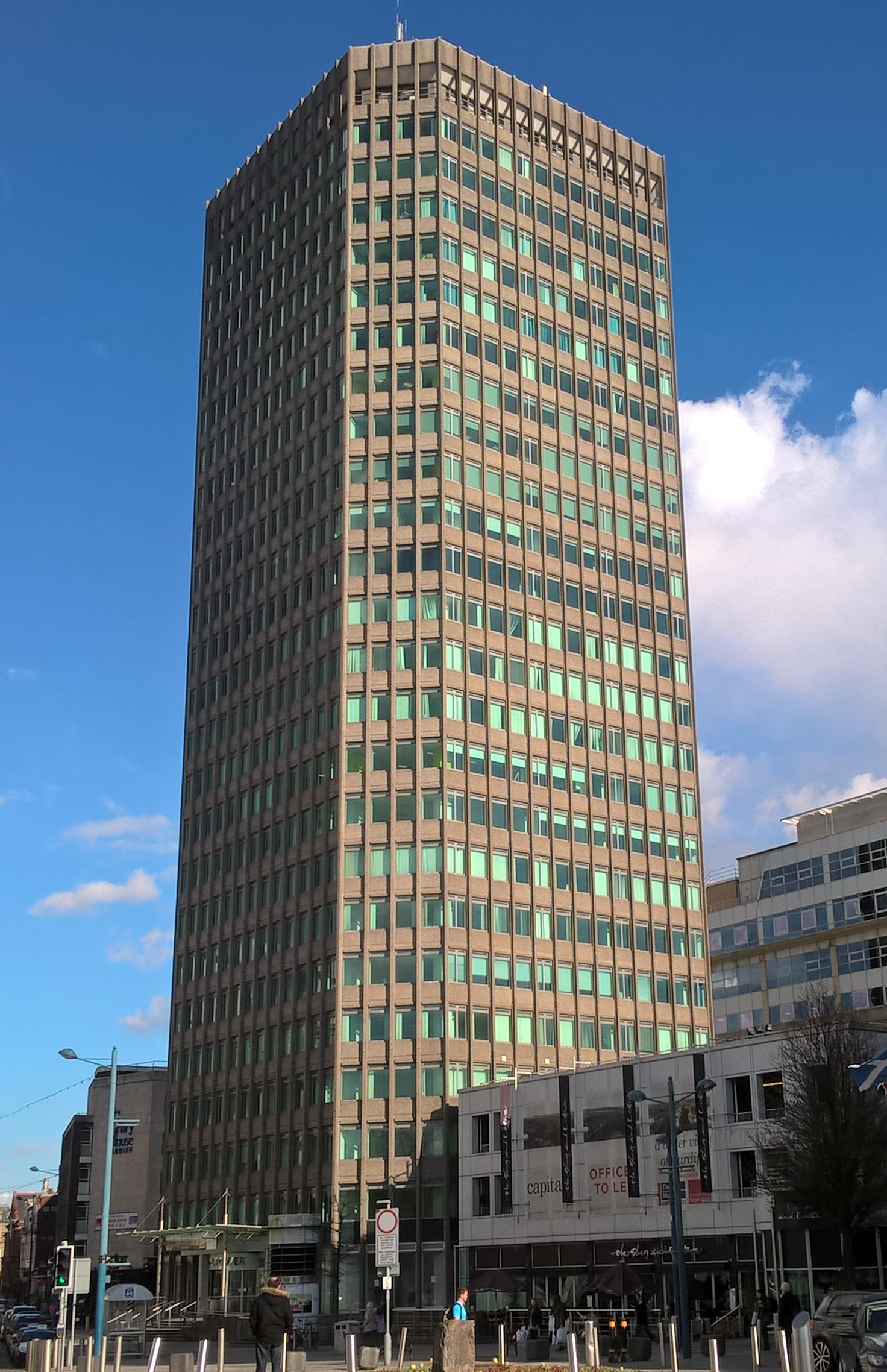
Capital Tower

Capital Tower, originally known as Pearl Assurance House, is a high-rise building in Cardiff, Wales. Standing at 270 feet (82 m) to roof height, Capital Tower is slightly taller than Stadium House, which stands at 78 metres (256 ft) to roof height (though inclusion of the antenna gives Stadium House a pinnacle height of 120 metres (390 ft)).

== History ==
The foundations were built on the ruins of a 12th-century friary, much of which had still stood until 1955. These were completely cleared for the tower to be constructed, although it is probable that under modern planning laws this would not have been allowed.

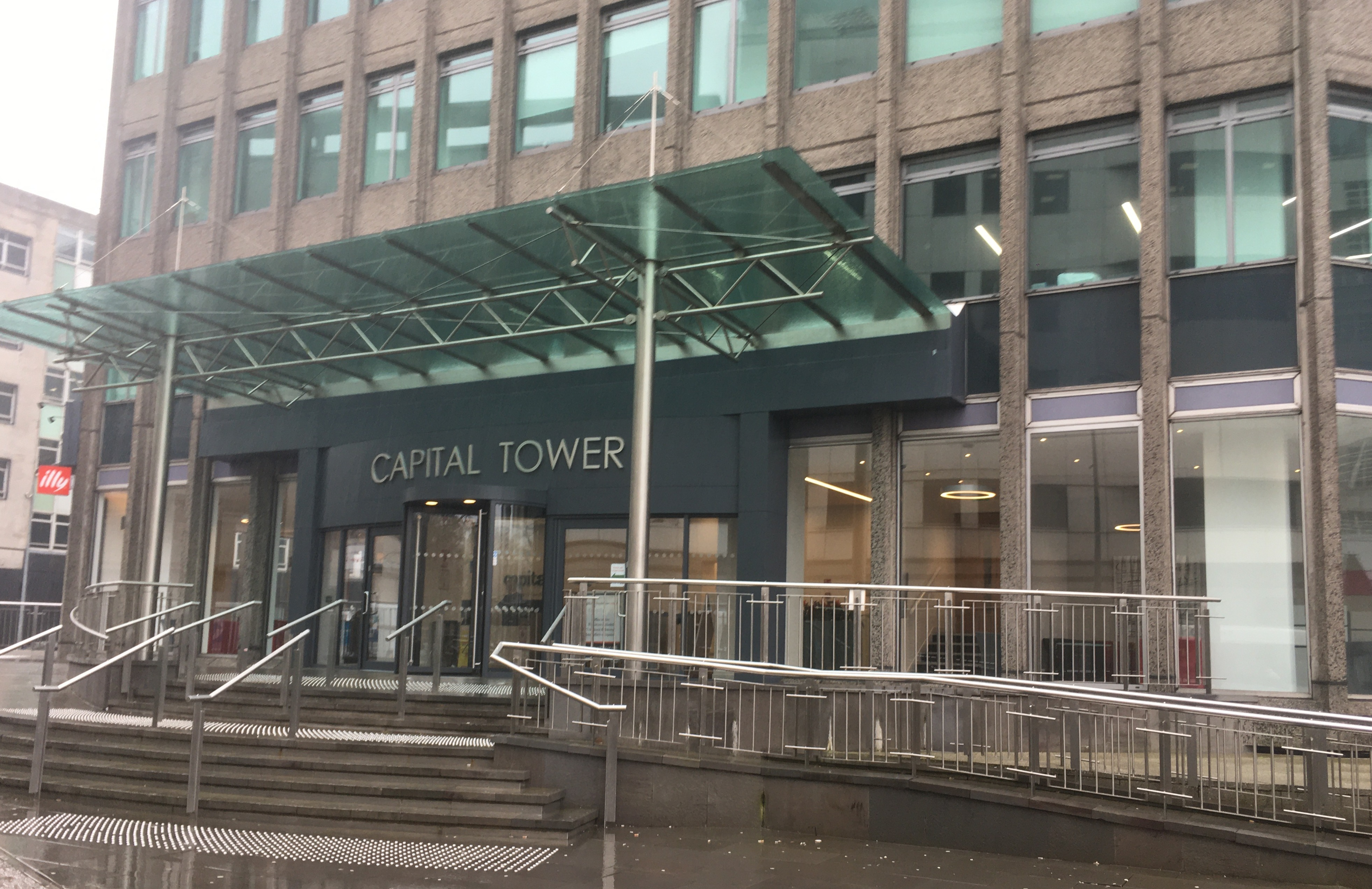
Entrance to Capital Tower

Construction was started in 1967 and completed on schedule at a cost of £1.5 million, with the building being officially opened on 7 April 1970 by Lord Lieutenant of Glamorgan, Sir Cennydd Traherne. It was originally known as Pearl Assurance House, after the Pearl Assurance company.

For a long period it was the tallest building in Wales, until it was overtaken by Swansea's The Tower, Meridian Quay completed in 2009.

The building provides 190,000 sq ft (18,000 m^{2}) of floor space, Originally, a jobcentre, bookshop and galleries were built on the lower floors, but in 1998 they were replaced by a new set of developments including cafe-bars, and the multi-storey car parks were re-clad. At this time the building received its current name, Capital Tower.

On 25 November 2002, the tower was sold for £17.4 million by Aberdeen Property Investors to the Raven Group. In August 2012, DTZ secured the £12.35 million sale of Capital Tower and Friary House to the Topland Group.

In 2018 the building was for sale at an asking price of £23.4 million.

The building currently houses offices for The Law Society, ranstad, AA, DevOpsGroup, Allianz, Yard, Admiral and Dolmans.

== See also ==
- List of tallest buildings in Cardiff
