= House for the Future, Cardiff =

The House for the Future
- Interactive map of the The House for the Future area
- Alternative names: Ty Gwyrdd

General information
- Location: St Fagans National History Museum, Cardiff, Wales
- Coordinates: 51°29′12″N 3°16′18″W
- Opened: 2000

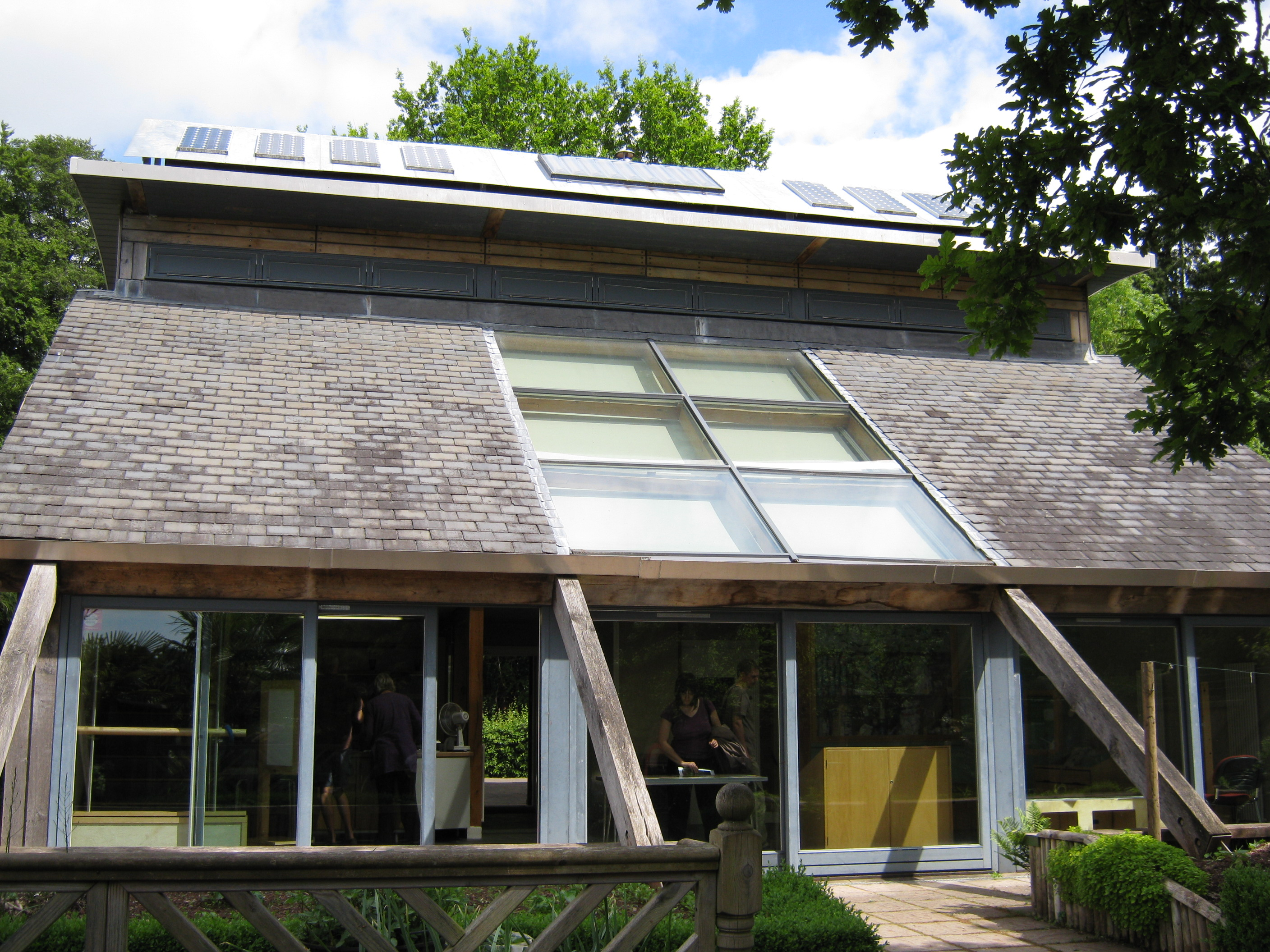
The House for the Future (south)

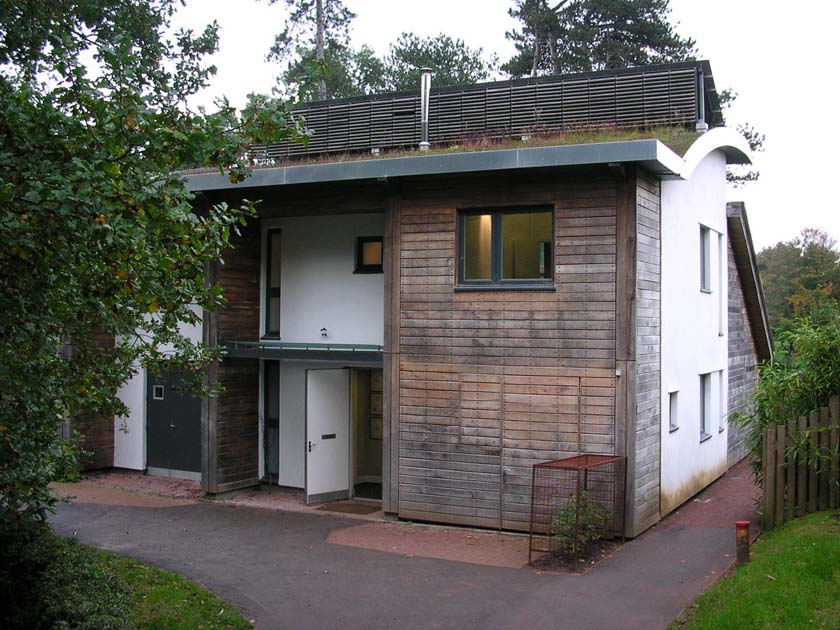
The House for the Future (north) showing the alpine garden roof

The House for the Future, sometimes called House of the Future and more recently renamed Ty Gwyrdd (Welsh for 'Green House'), is a modern house located in the St Fagans National History Museum on the western edge of Cardiff, Wales. Completed in 2000, it was originally a showcase of the latest green building technologies, but was later transformed into an education centre. It was described by architectural writer Owen Hatherley as "a rather ambitiuous gesture for a place devoted to reconstructing the past".

== Design and construction ==
The House for the Future project was a joint venture between the National Museum of Wales, BBC Wales and Redrow Homes with support from Malcolm Parry, head of the Welsh School of Architecture. An architectural competition was launched to design an adaptable, eco-home, which received 321 expressions of interest. These were reduced to a shortlist of six finalists, from which the winner was announced in July 1999 as London firm Jestico & Whiles.

Redrow Homes were tasked with constructing the building within a £120,000 budget, but because many of the components of the project were not widely available (for example the oak frame and the green roof) the costs spiralled. It was completed in December 2000 and the process also resulted in three 40 minute BBC television programmes.

A competition was then held to choose a family to live in the house for a week. It was won by the Powell family from Bridgend, who enjoyed the open plan kitchen, but disliked the bedrooms and had problems with the computer controls.

The house was officially opened by Welsh Government Minister for Culture, Jenny Randerson, at the end of April 2001.

It went on to win several design awards, including the National Homebuilder Design Award (2001) and the Welsh Housing Design award (2002). Redrow meanwhile were criticised for building houses only 10 minutes away that were the antithesis of the St Fagans house, with The Telegraph saying they were "getting ever further away, not closer, to the house of the future it has sponsored."

== Features ==
The house was designed to make a net carbon dioxide emission of zero.

Features included:

- Use of locally sourced materials wherever possible, including use of the earth excavated for the foundations to make bricks
- Sedum green roof
- Rainwater collection
- Solar panels providing energy and hot water
- Ground source heat pump and underfloor heating
- Large areas of glazing on the south side of the house, with automatic shutters, to maximise solar gain
- A flexible internal design, catering for accessibility and adaptable to changing family needs
- Insulation using sheep's wool and newspaper
- Voice activated low-energy lighting

== Education centre ==
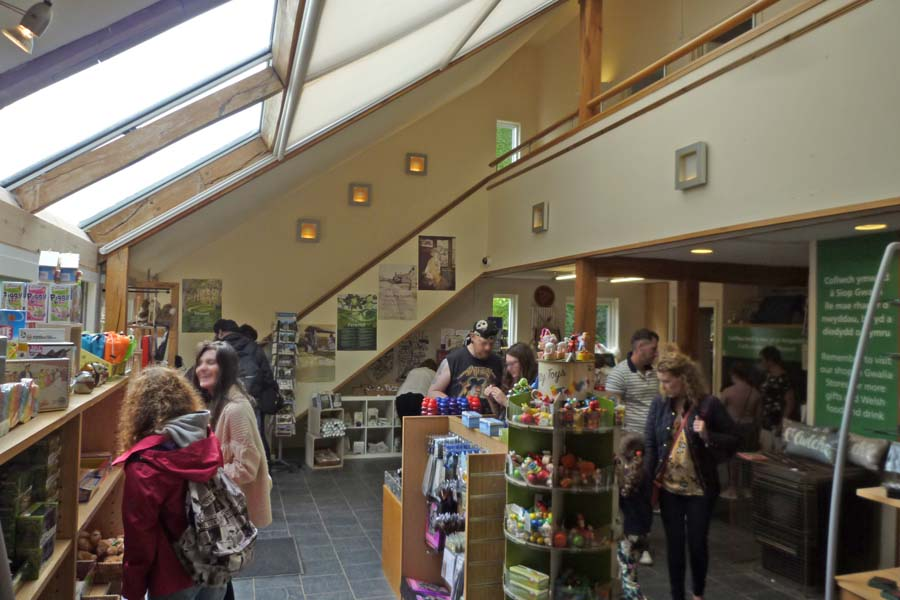
Inside Ty Gwrdd shop (2016)

After ten years many of the futuristic elements had been superseded by current technology, for example recycling of refuse was now common and low wattage lightbulbs were widely used in households. Other systems, for example the solar panels and ground source heat pumps remained prohibitively expensive. The contents had begun to look dated and it was claimed the museum's culture did not support serious investment to keep the technology ahead of fashion. With its days numbered as a futuristic exhibit, plans were put in place in 2009 to convert the house into an educational centre, named Ty Gwyrdd ('Green House'), to host environmental courses.

During refurbishment of the museum's main building during the 2010s, Ty Gwyrdd was used as the main gift shop.

== See also ==
- Low-impact development (UK)
