= Maya Capital =

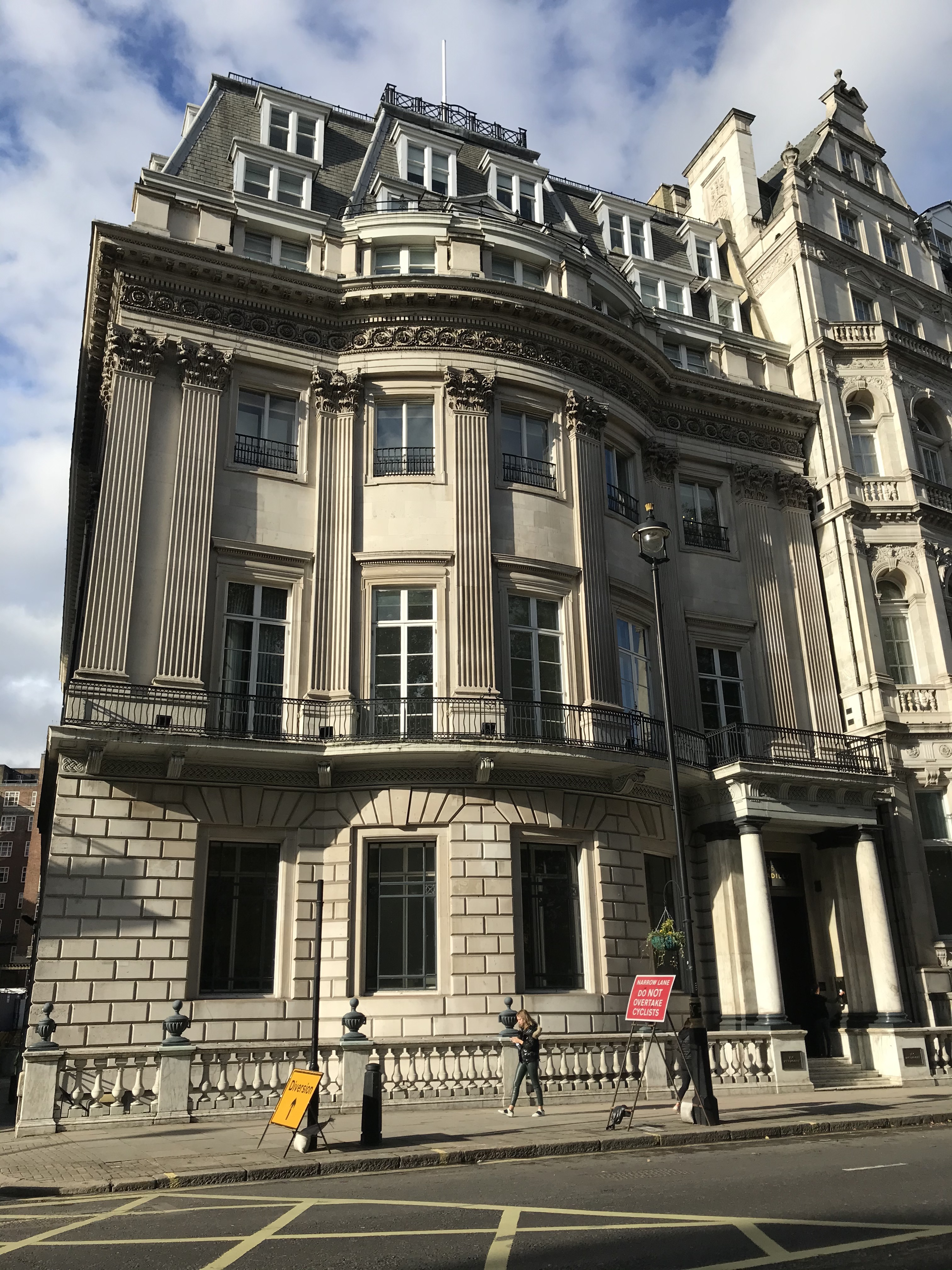
- Registered office at 105 Piccadilly, London
- Type: Private
- Industry: Private Equity
- Founded: 2014; 12 years ago
- Headquarters: London
- Products: Private Equity, Real Estate
- Website: www.maya-cap.com

Maya Capital is a British real estate and private equity investment firm based in London. The firm's major activities to date have concentrated on investment in UK real estate outside London. Their strategy focuses on creating initiatives, such as asset repositioning, financial structuring, property development, and seeking opportunities resulting from special situations.

== History ==
The firm was founded in 2014. In February 2015, Maya Capital closed a £6m investment in Swansea consisting of a 66,800 sq ft office building let entirely to the DVLA with 4.5 years of lease remaining at a yield of 10%. Maya Capital was advised on the transaction by Gerald Eve LLP and Mishcon de Reya.

In 2014 Maya Capital also completed 15 million pounds of investments in London within the M25 motorway, including the acquisition and sale of Countryside House, an office building in Brentwood; and the acquisition of 160-163 Friar Street, an office building in Reading, Berkshire in October 2014.
