= Stadium House, Cardiff =

Building in Cardiff, Wales

Coordinates: 51.477808°N 3.180606°W

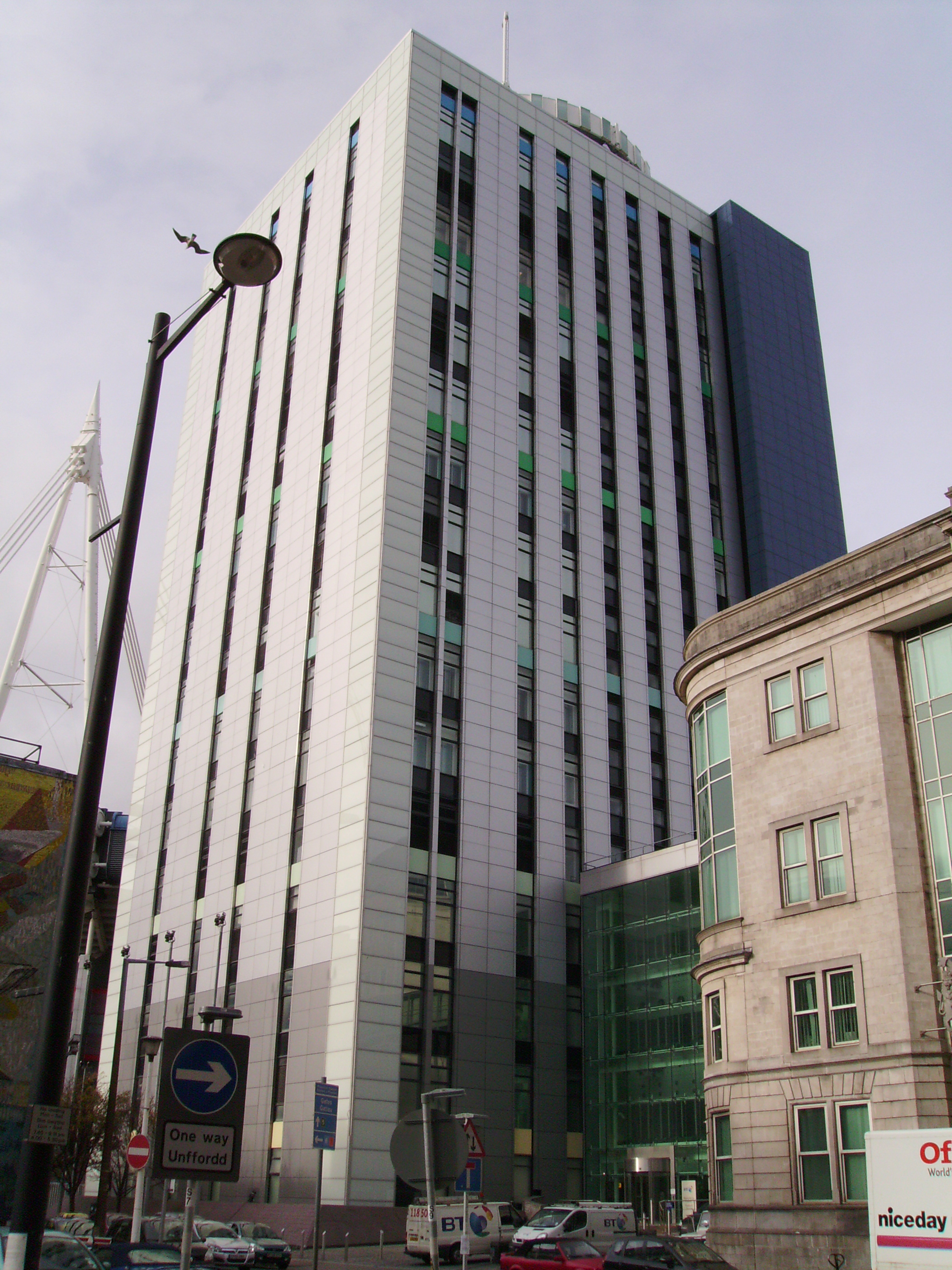
Stadium House

Stadium House (Welsh: Tŷ Stadiwm) in Park Street, Cardiff, Wales, is the eighth tallest building in Cardiff, Wales, which stands next to the Millennium Stadium. The 255 feet (78 m) tall building is owned by BT Group, and underwent a £7.1 million refurbishment programme in 2002.

== Construction ==
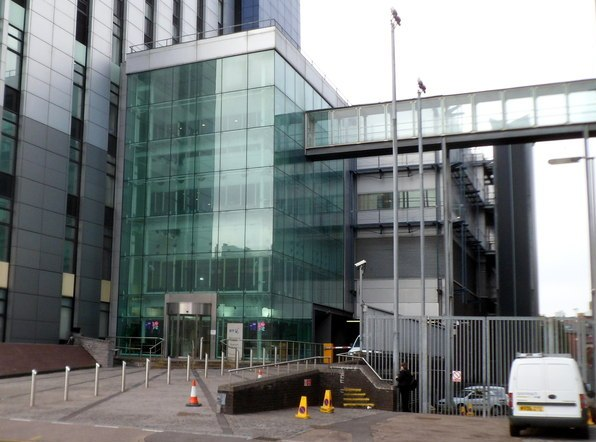
Entrance to Stadium House and the skyway which links to Park Gate in Westgate Street

Work started on the building in March 1974 and was completed in 1976. The building is now clad in white and blue, while the roof is topped with a 131 feet (40 m) stainless steel spire, which was lit up green and white in the evening, to complement the cladding. The addition of this spire qualifies the building as the tallest in Cardiff and Wales, at 390 feet (120 m), if the spire is included. This building is also an internet exchange point.

The building is clad in a composite material. Numerous incidents of the cladding falling off the building have resulted in adjacent roads being closed.

== See also ==
- List of tallest buildings in Cardiff
