= Malcolm Parry =

Welsh architect (born c. 1938)

C. Malcolm Parry (born c. 1938) is a Welsh architect, professor emeritus, and TV/radio broadcaster.

== Early life ==
Parry was born in Blaenavon, left school at the age of 15 and trained as a Mining Surveyor. He intended to attend university to study Civil Engineering but was encouraged by the then Head of Architecture at Cardiff University to study architecture. Parry was later employed by the university to teach and carry out research.

== Employment at Cardiff University ==
Parry is a former Head of the Welsh School of Architecture at Cardiff University, which he led from 1997 until his retirement. In his teachings Parry showed a particular interest in the aspect of light in architecture, evident in the Architectural Practice Group of which he was director. The research group studies the processes of architectural design, including construction law, economics, process and the strategic management of estates. The group has links with the RIBA. Research into the design process includes the production of a Design Manual for Wales.

== TV appearances ==
Parry has presented several programmes about architecture on BBC television, for example On the House, as well as BBC Radio Wales programmes Building on the Past and Work Matter.

In 1999 he devised and progressed The House for the Future project in conjunction with the BBC, which resulted in a TV series about the construction of the building, which he presented.

In the first series of Building on the Past, Parry visited the towns of Newport, Newtown, Blaenavon, Carmarthen, Criccieth and Machynlleth, and in the second series Anglesey, Swansea, Presteigne, Lampeter, Merthyr, and Haverfordwest, relating the history of each town to its architecture.
