= Holland House, Cardiff =

Hotel in Cardiff, Wales

Holland House
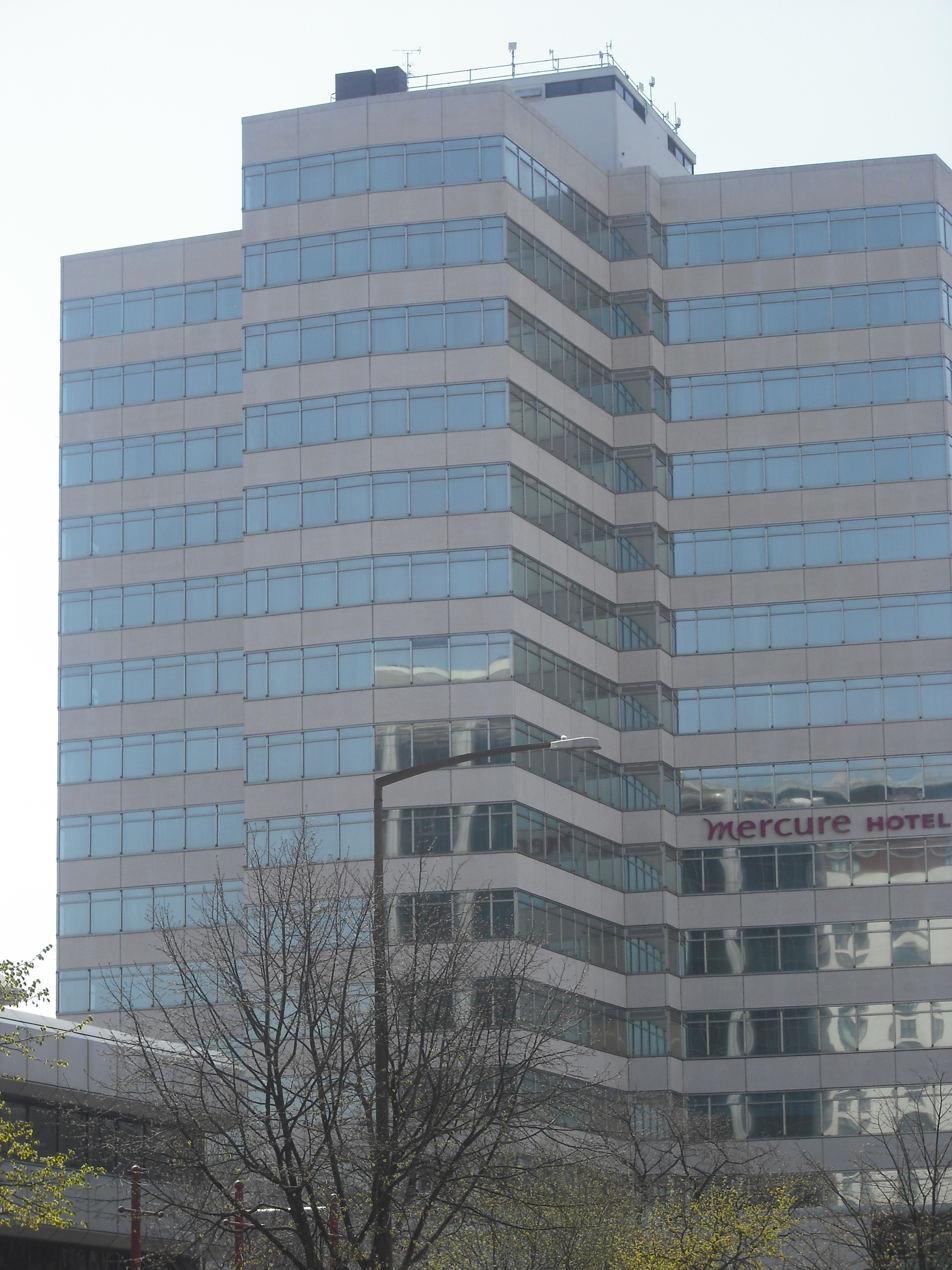
- Interactive map of the Holland House area
- Former names: Julian Hodge House; Julian S. Hodge Building; Macdonald Holland House
- Hotel chain: Mercure

General information
- Type: Hotel
- Location: Cardiff, Wales, 24-26 Newport Road, Cardiff city centre CF24 0DD
- Coordinates: 51.4836°N 3.1672°W
- Completed: 1968
- Renovated: 2004
- Owner: AccorHotels

Height
- Height: 60.30 metres (197.83 ft)

Other information
- Number of rooms: 165

Holland House, formerly called Julian Hodge House, is a high-rise hotel on Newport Road near the centre of Cardiff, Wales. Originally an office block, the 60.3-metre-high (197.83 ft) building has 15 floors and is the tenth tallest building in Cardiff.

== History ==
The building was constructed in 1968 by the Welsh financier Julian Hodge (1904 –2004). It was named Julian Hodge House, and later the Julian S. Hodge Building. It was built as an office block, with occupants including Lloyds TSB Bank.

The building was refurbished in 2003/4 for hotel use. The existing concrete framed structure was altered and a two-storey extension, built on top of a basement car park area, was demolished.

In 2004 it became the Macdonald Holland House Hotel. The hotel was run by Macdonald Hotels until 2007, when it was sold to AccorHotels to operate under the Mercure brand. It was known as Mercure Cardiff Holland House Hotel & Spa until 18 March 2025, when it left Accor. It now operates as Holland House Hotel Cardiff By Sunday.

In 2006, the exterior of the building was used as a hospital for the BBC television sci-fi drama series Torchwood, which was produced in Cardiff.

== Hotel facilities ==
Holland House Cardiff is a 4-star hotel with 165 rooms. It has a first floor restaurant and a lounge bar, an indoor swimming pool and seventeen meeting spaces.

== See also ==
- List of tallest buildings in Cardiff
