= Cardiff city centre =

Coordinates: 51.48°N 3.17°W

Cardiff City Centre: Welsh: Canol y Ddinas, Caerdydd
- Central Business District
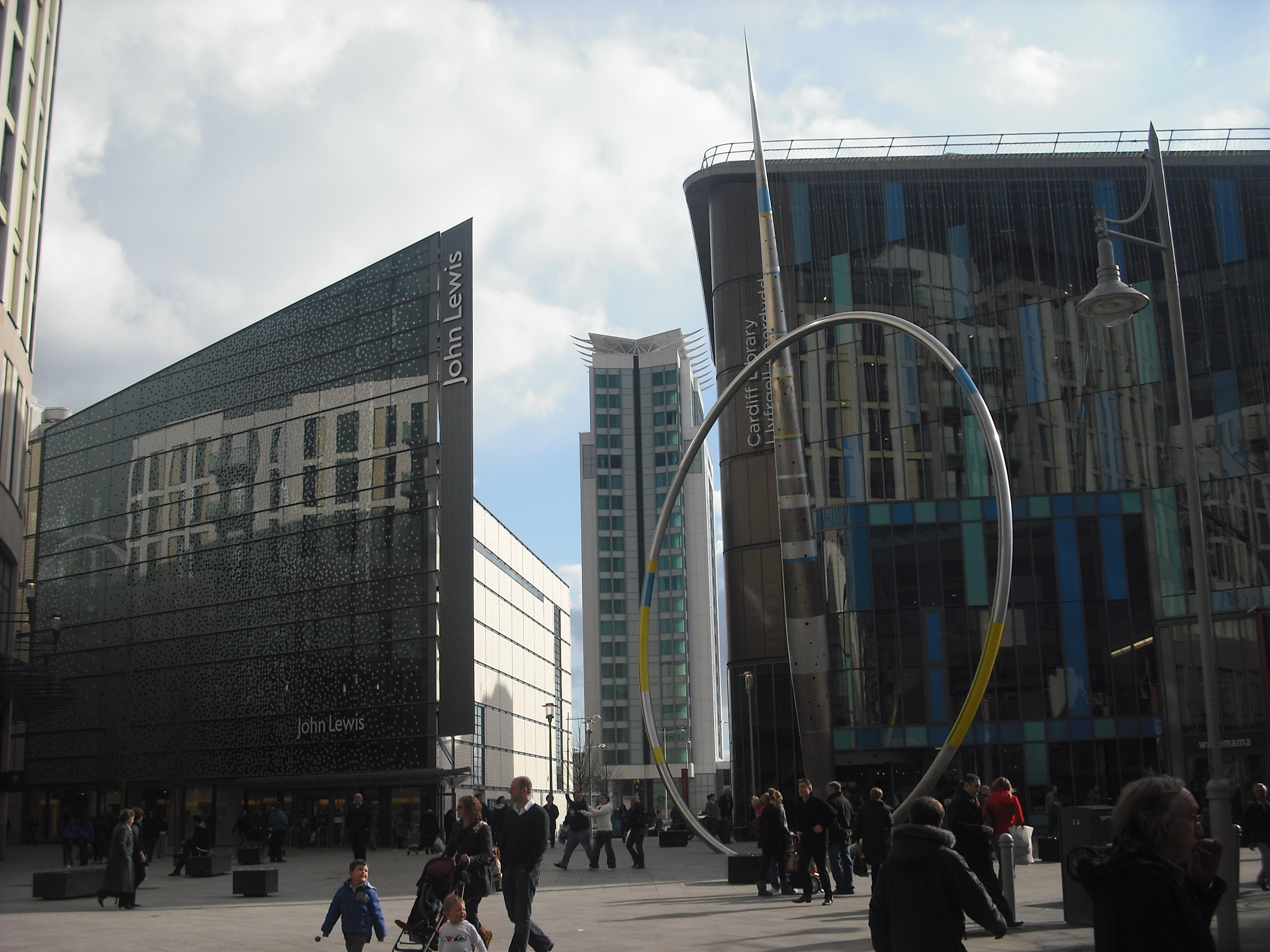
- The Hayes, Cardiff with Cardiff Central Library (right)

- Location within Cardiff
- Principal area: Cardiff
- Preserved county: Cardiff
- Country: Wales
- Sovereign state: United Kingdom
- Post town: CARDIFF
- Postcode district: CF10; CF11; CF24
- Dialling code: 029
- Police: South Wales
- Fire: South Wales
- Ambulance: Welsh
- UK Parliament: Cardiff South and Penarth
- Senedd Cymru – Welsh Parliament: Cardiff Central

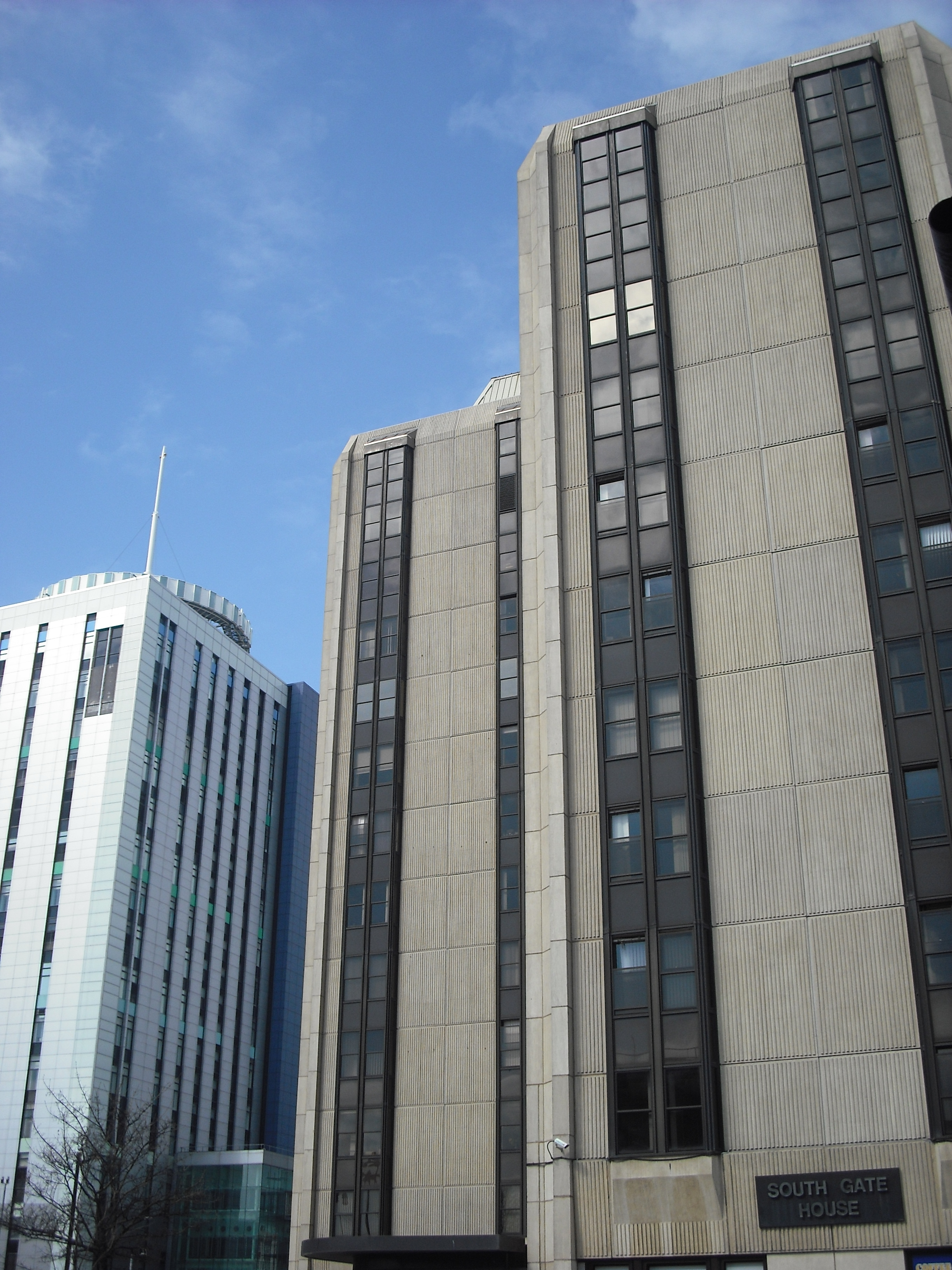
Stadium House (left) and South Gate House (right), in the west of the city centre

Cardiff city centre (Welsh: Canol Dinas Caerdydd) is the city centre and central business district of Cardiff, Wales. The area is tightly bound by the River Taff to the west, the Civic Centre to the north and railway lines and two railway stations – Central and Queen Street – to the south and east respectively. Cardiff became a city in 1905.

The city centre in Cardiff consists of principal shopping streets: Queen Street, St. Mary's Street and the Hayes, as well as large shopping centres, and numerous arcades and lanes that house some smaller, specialized shops and boutiques.

The city centre has undergone a number of redevelopment projects, including St. David's 2, which extended the shopping district southwards, creating 100 new stores and a flagship John Lewis, the only branch in Wales and the largest outside London. Compared to nearby cities, the new St David's Centre has more retail space than the whole of Newport or Swansea.

In 2008–9, the annual footfall of shoppers was 55 million, and is expected to have risen to 66 million by 2009–10. Cardiff is the sixth most successful shopping destination in the United Kingdom – behind London, Glasgow, Birmingham, Manchester and Liverpool.

== History ==
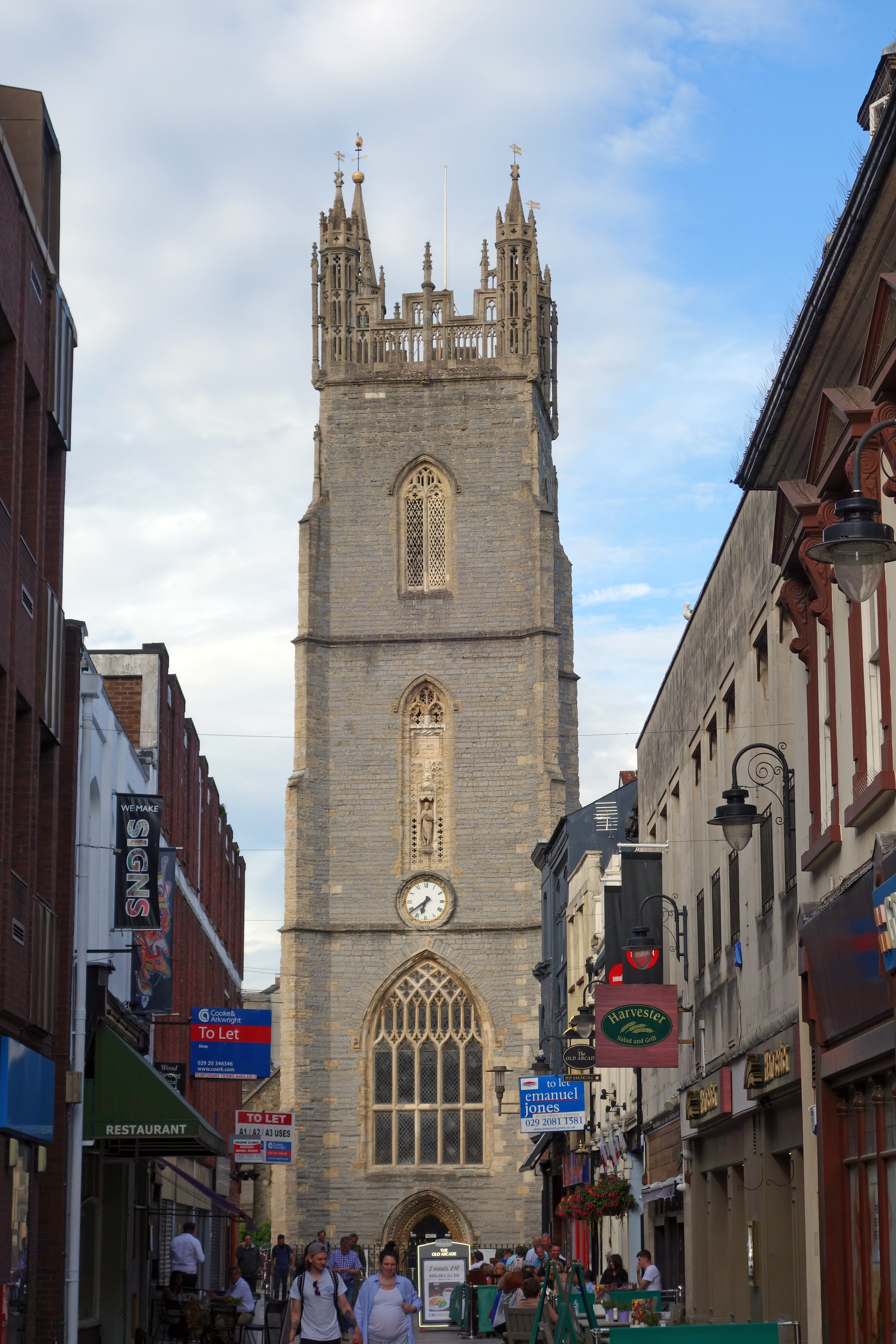
St John the Baptist Church, Cardiff's only medieval parish church in the city centre.

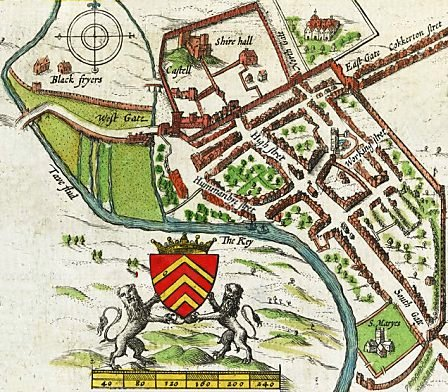
John Speed's 1610 map of Cardiff

Cardiff was granted city status by Edward VII in 1905.

In the 1960s, planners described Cardiff city centre as "worn out, inconvenient, drab and dangerous". The centre had escaped the extensive wartime bomb damage inflicted on other cities, so little redevelopment took place in the 1950s and 1960s. The Buchanan Plan of 1964 envisaged a highly ambitious extended city centre, crossed with urban motorways. The council scrapped the proposed motorway network and focused on the small commercial core of the city; its proposed redevelopment scheme, in partnership with a private developer, would have seen almost all of the city centre (except St Mary Street and Working Street) demolished, replaced by modernist office towers of up to 21 storeys and pedestrianised decks linking multi‑storey car parks to covered shopping malls.

By the time the legal agreement to implement 'Centreplan 70' was signed, the 1973 property crash had made it unviable. However, one legacy of the scheme was the future segregation of office and retail development, with the west end of Newport Road as the principal office area with secondary concentrations on Churchill Way, Greyfriars Road and Westgate Street.

Development in the 1970s and 80s was more piecemeal than envisaged in Centreplan, with the building of the St. David's Centre and St David's Hall, new multi‑storey car parks, and the grant‑supported construction of the 14‑storey Holiday Inn (now the Marriott) and World Trade Centre (now the Cardiff International Arena), which gave a fillip to the city's conference and exhibition business. In the mid–1980s developers returned to Queen Street, creating three medium‑sized malls, helping it to become one of the best performing shopping streets in the country in terms of footfall and rental levels.

In the 1990s the Mill Lane cafe quarter was developed in partnership with the Welsh Development Agency, a pedestrian forecourt was created for the refurbished Central railway station, a new walkway was constructed alongside the Taff and the Millennium Stadium was built on the site of the National Stadium and Empire Pool. The latter became, according to official publicists, one of the icons of Cardiff's new image.

== Castle Quarter ==
The Castle Quarter includes some of Cardiff's Victorian and Edwardian arcades: Castle Arcade, High Street Arcade and Duke Street Arcade, and principal shopping streets: St Mary Street, High Street, Castle Street and Duke Street.

Development and Pedestrianisation of the area began in February 2010 and was completed by October. Cardiff Council says that work to create the Castle Quarter as a pedestrian friendly environment for High Street and St Mary Street is designed to enhance the city centre.

=== Castle Street/Duke Street/Kingsway ===
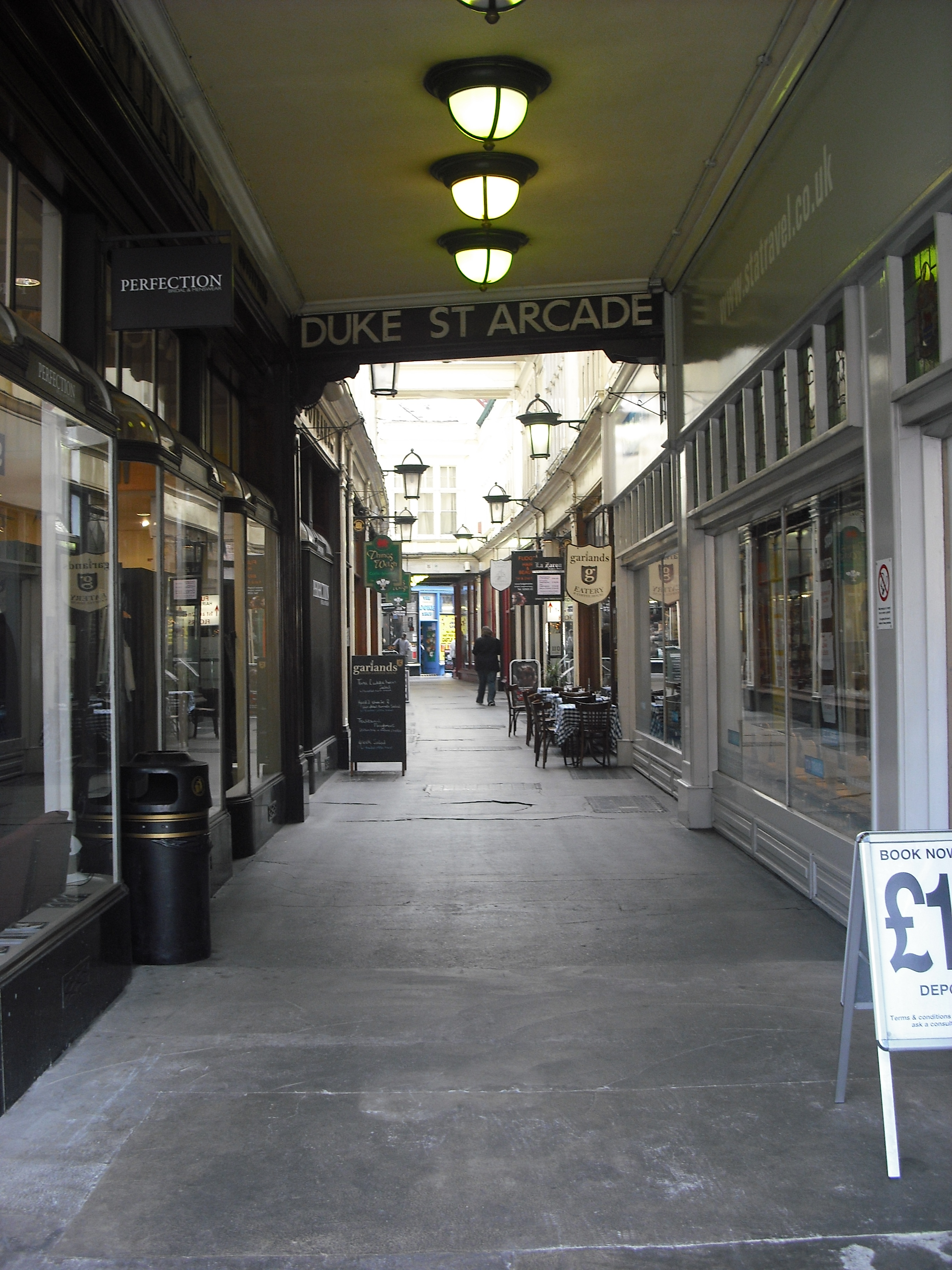
Duke Street Arcade

Castle Street follows on from Cowbridge Road East from Canton and begins after Cardiff Bridge, over the River Taff. It becomes Duke Street after the junction with High Street before turning north and becoming Kingsway, leading to Cardiff Civic Centre. From west to east, streets that begin from the southern side of this stretch are Westgate Street, Womanby Street, High Street (St Marys Street), St Johns Street (The Hayes), Queen Street and Greyfriars Road. Cardiff Castle and Bute Park dominate the northern side of the street. On the southern side are pubs, bars, retail and hotel units. Castle Arcade and Duke Street Arcades begin from this stretch.

=== St. Mary Street and High Street ===
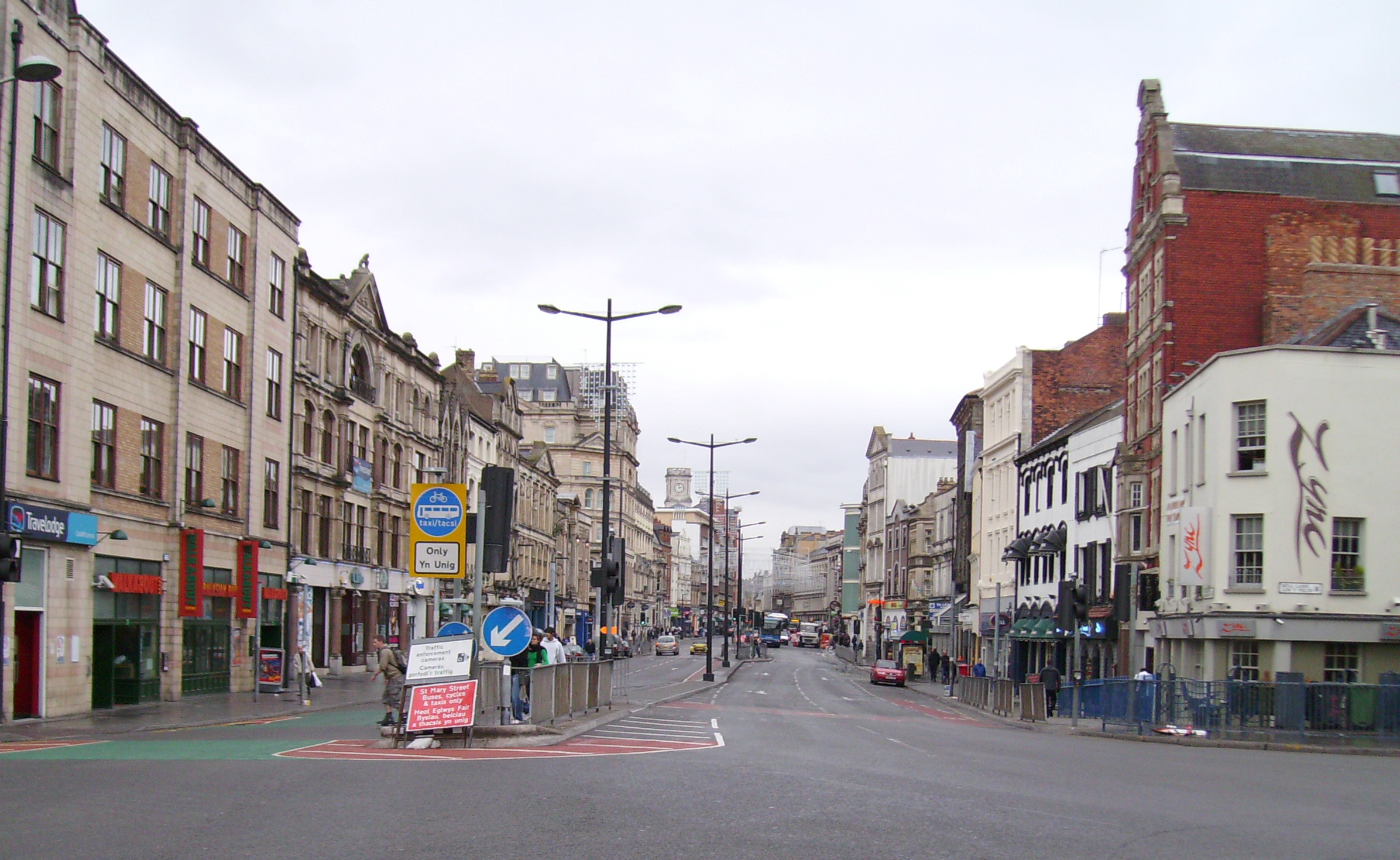
St. Mary Street south end

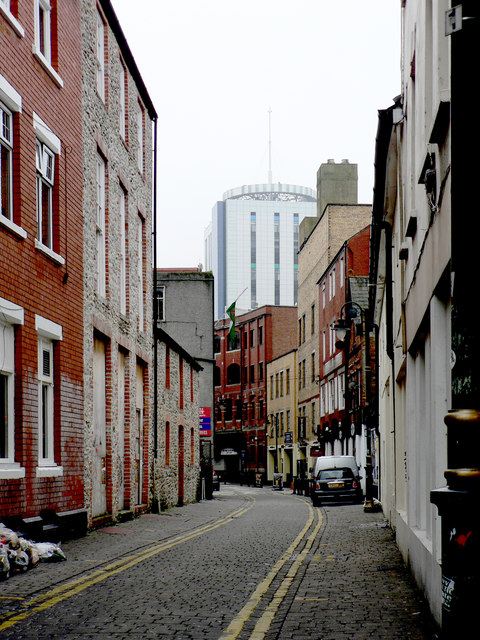
Womanby Street looking south

St. Mary Street (Welsh: Heol Eglwys Fair) and High Street (Welsh: Heol Fawr). The former street is named after the 11th century church of St. Mary, the largest in Cardiff until it was destroyed by the Bristol Channel floods of 1607. Today the stretch of road is the home of a number of bars, night clubs and restaurants, as well as branches of many major banks. Also fronting onto the street is Howells department store, which stretches from just after Cardiff Central Market to the corner of Wharton Street. From August 2007 the street was closed to private vehicles, leaving only buses, cycles and taxis allowed to access the whole street. The street is usually closed to all traffic every Friday and Saturday night to allow the efflux from night clubs and pubs located in that part of the street to clear. It is also closed when major events take place such as at the Millennium Stadium. The Prince of Wales is a prominent J D Wetherspoon establishment at the junction with Wood Street, which leads to Central Station. At the northern end of the street is Castle Street and Cardiff Castle. To the south is Callaghan Square.

=== Womanby Street ===
Womanby Street is one of Cardiff's oldest streets. It is known for its small, independent live music venues and is home to Clwb Ifor Bach. It is accessed from Castle Street, between Westgate Street and High Street.

== Queen Street and vicinity ==
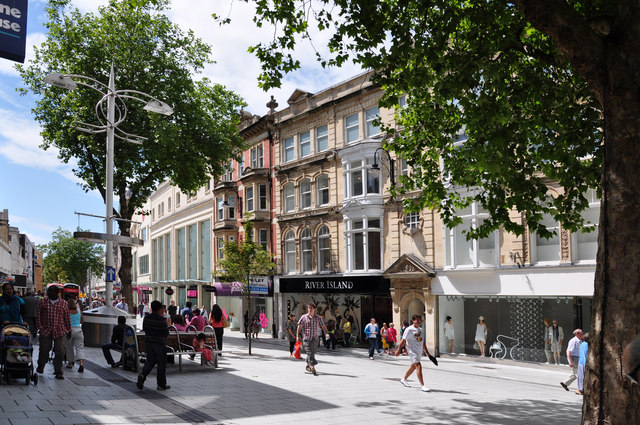
Queen Street

Queen Street (Welsh: Heol y Frenhines) is the main thoroughfare in the city, now wholly pedestrianised. Most of Queen Street, from the castle moat to Dumfries Place, used to be called Crockherbtown (Crockherbtown Lane can still be found off Park Place), but the street was renamed in honour of Queen Victoria in 1886. Queen Street was pedestrianised in 1974 and is served by Cardiff Queen Street railway station on Station Terrace. It meets Dumfries Place/Newport Road at its eastern end, Duke Street/Castle Street at its western, and Park Place approximately halfway along. Further down Park Place is the New Theatre, a local landmark is Principality House, head office of the Principality Building Society. To the north running parallel is Greyfriars Road, referring to the site of an old monastery, a traditional office location that has recently seen conversion to bars, apartments and hotels as offices move to the new business parks on the edge of the city, or to the better connected southern end of the city centre.

Charles Street, named after the landowner (and twice Cardiff mayor) Charles Vachell, was originally built in the 1840s as luxury housing. When Cardiff's new drainage was being devised, in 1849, Charles Street was described as Cardiff's "principal street". It joins the north side of Queen Street about halfway along its length. The street became more commercial later in the 1800s. In the 1970s it became the home of the Welsh Arts Council's Oriel gallery. It is also the location of St Davids Catholic Cathedral.

== Cathays Park (Civic Centre) ==
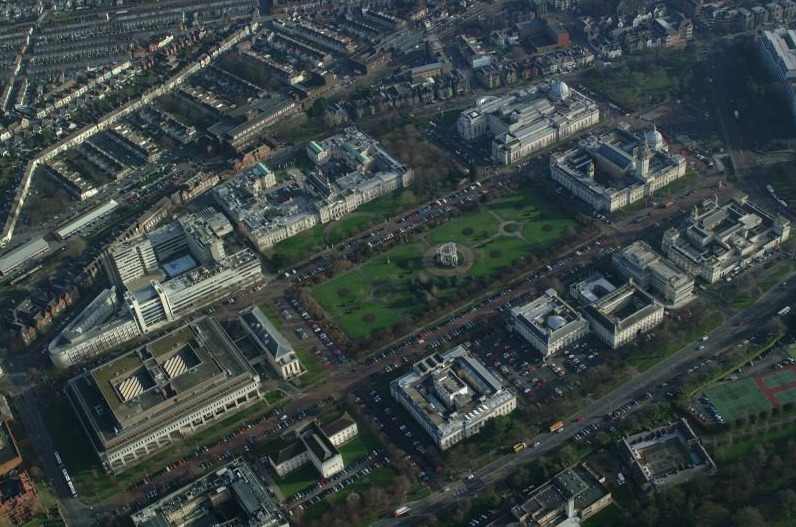
Cathays Park

Cathays Park is the civic centre of Cardiff. The Edwardian architecture of Cardiff City Hall, National Museum and Gallery of Wales, Cardiff University, Cardiff Crown Court, and the administrative headquarters of the Welsh Government dominate the area. Behind the City Hall is the Welsh National War Memorial. Bute Park also dominates the northwest of the area, running behind Cardiff Castle along the River Taff southward to Westgate Street and northward to Gabalfa. Cardiff's Winter Wonderland ice rink and fairground returns to the front lawn of the City Hall every winter.

Boulevard de Nantes and Stuttgarter Strasse, named after Cardiff's twin cities, run through the southern end and act as a northern bypass of parallel Queen Street for the A4161. To the west, it is connected to Kingsway (leading to Castle Street and St Mary Street), and Dumfries Place/ Newport Road to the east. Park Place runs north to south through the area, linking it to the A470 in the north and Queen Street in the south

== Eastern city centre ==
=== Dumfries Place/Newport Road ===
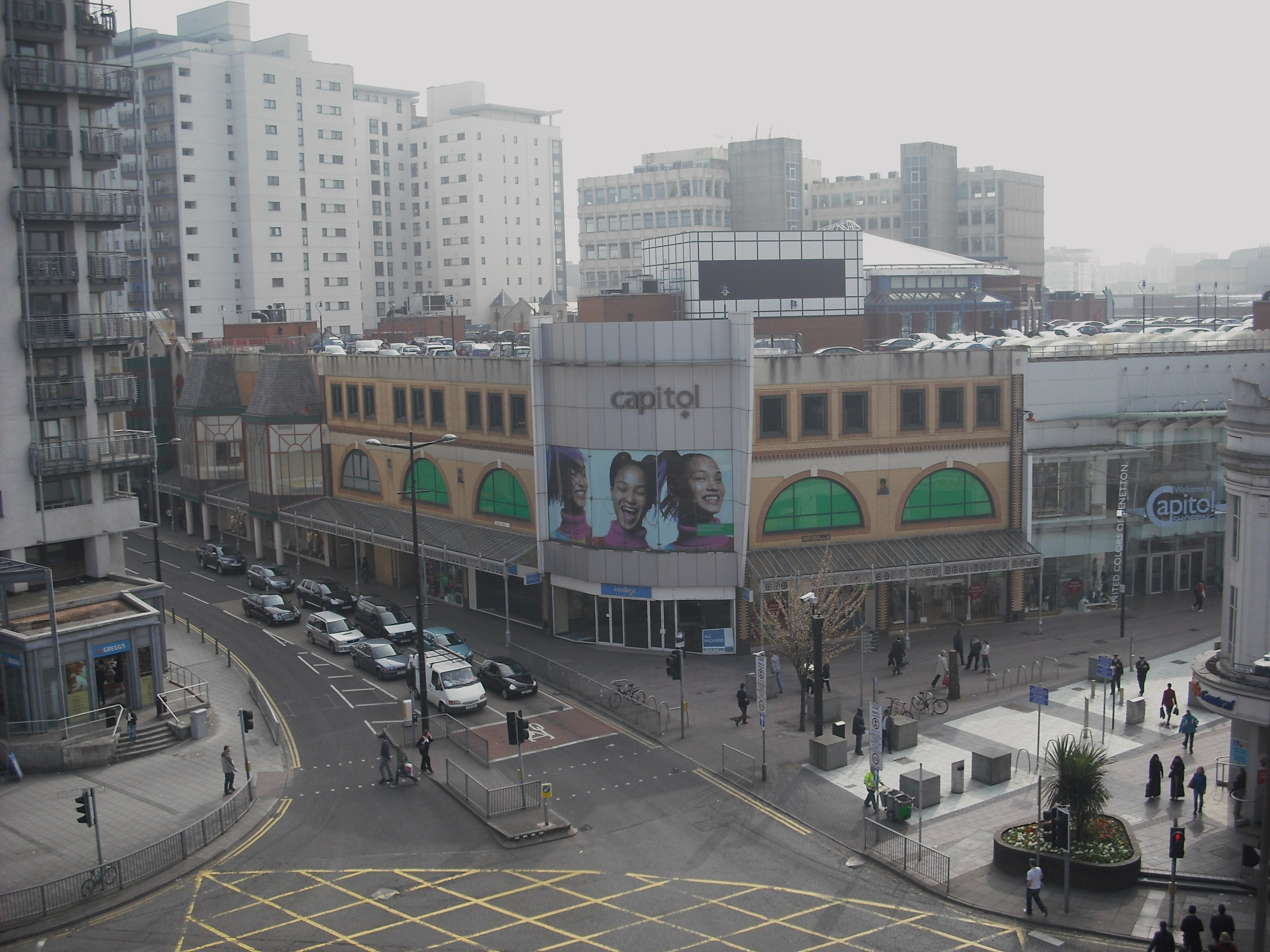
The junction of Newport Road, Queen Street and Dumfries Place

Dumfries Place is named after the Earl of Dumfries, a courtesy title given to the Marquis of Bute's eldest son.

Newport Road, the major road leading east from Queen Street towards the neighbouring city of Newport, has been one of the prime office locations of central Cardiff since the 1960s. Some of the original buildings have been converted from office use to residential (e.g. The Aspect, Admiral House or hotel use including the Mercure Holland House. Occupancy of the remaining commercial property has increased, reflecting a shortage of office space in the city and there is now little scope for further conversion. Newport Road is also home to several buildings owned by Cardiff University, and Shand House, occupied by Cardiff Institute for the Blind.

Newport Road is also the site for the Cardiff Royal Infirmary, now providing long-term care and rehabilitation. The hospital once housed 500 beds and provided the main A&E service for Cardiff before the University Hospital of Wales took over these functions.

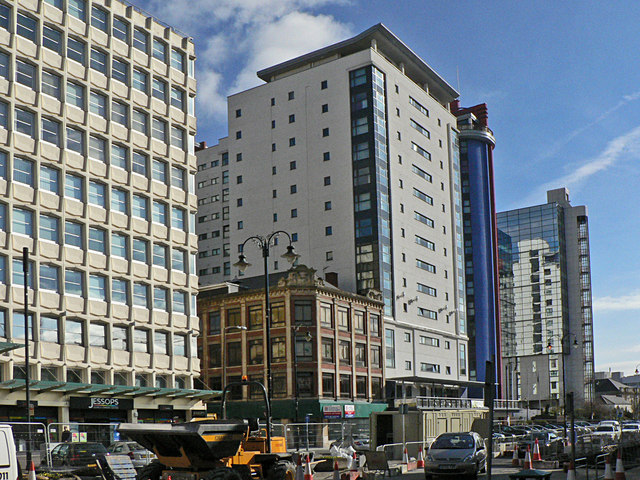
The eastern side of Churchill Way

=== Churchill Way ===
Churchill Way runs parallel to the west of Station Terrace (Cardiff Queen Street station) and joins Queen Street in the north and Bute Terrace in the south. The Capitol Centre is on the corner with Queen Street. Further along this road are office and modern apartment developments. The Cardiff office of the Driving Standards Agency, former British Gas offices in Helmont House (now a Premier Inn), and an Ibis Hotel are located on this street. The Cardiff office of the DSA subsequently closed.

Cardiff Masonic Hall occupies a major site on the corner of Guildford Street, adjacent to Churchill Way.

== Southwestern city centre ==
=== Wood Street ===
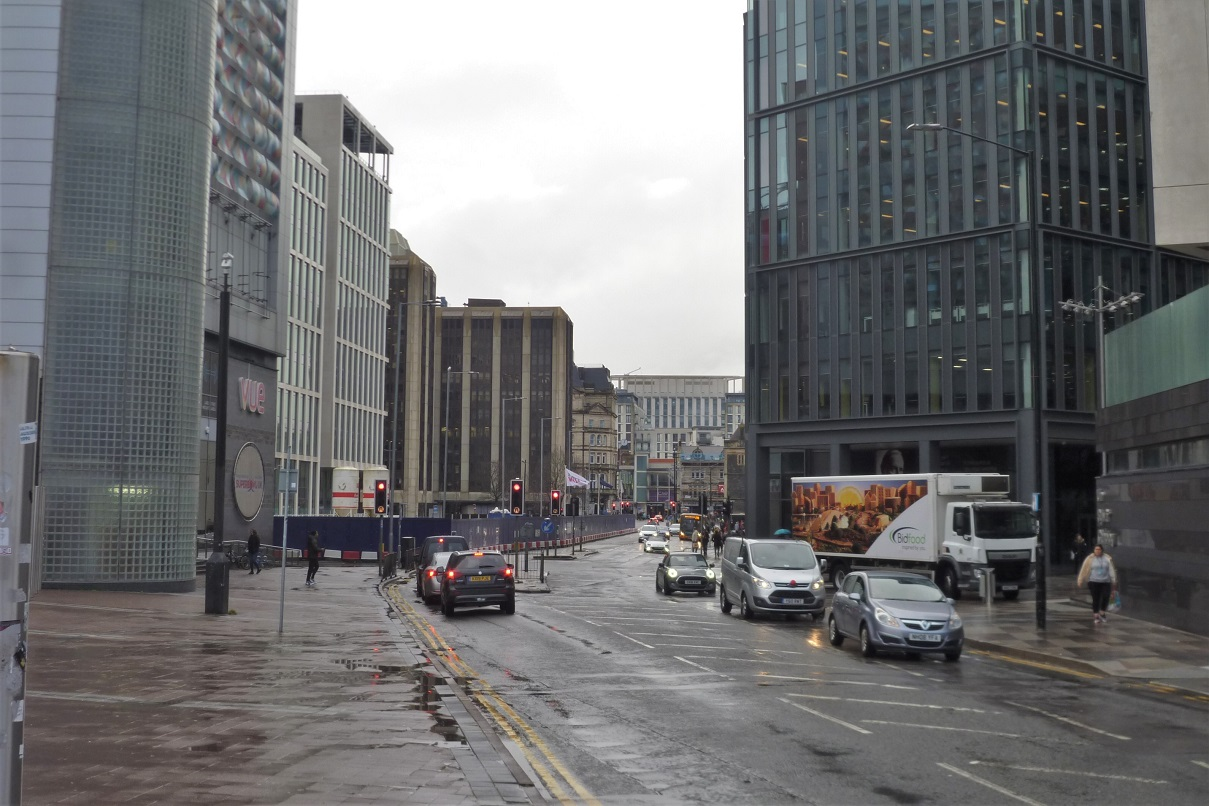
Wood Street in December 2019

Wood Street is the main access point for Cardiff Central railway and Central bus stations, with the latter undergoing reconstruction since early 2008. The street also had bus stands running along the length of the street as well. St David's House, which ran most of its length, was demolished in 2019. Travelling westwards along this street are the Millennium Stadium, Millennium Plaza (with bars, night clubs, comedy clubs and a Vue cinema), Stadium House, Media Wales (offices of the South Wales Echo and Western Mail) and Southgate House, (which houses among other organisations the Cardiff offices for the Armed Forces).

=== Central Square ===
Central Square is a large public space between Wood Street and Cardiff Central railway station. It includes Cardiff bus station. In 2012 plans were announced to redevelop the square and rename it 'Capital Square'.

=== Westgate Street ===
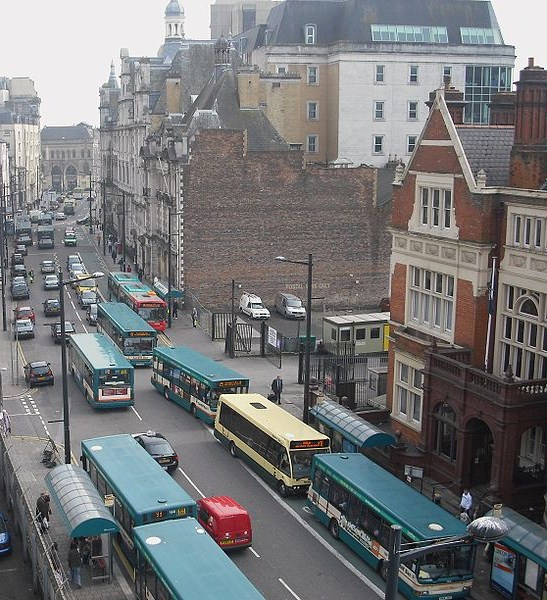
The southern end of Westgate Street towards the perpendicular Wood Street

Westgate Street runs parallel just west of St Marys Street for about half of the latter's length, linked by several alleys and lanes. Linking Castle Street and Wood Street, Cardiff Arms Park and the Millennium Stadium dominate its western side, whereas pubs and bars and hotels dominate its eastern side, with the Angel Hotel at the north end and the Royal Hotel to the south.

== The Hayes ==
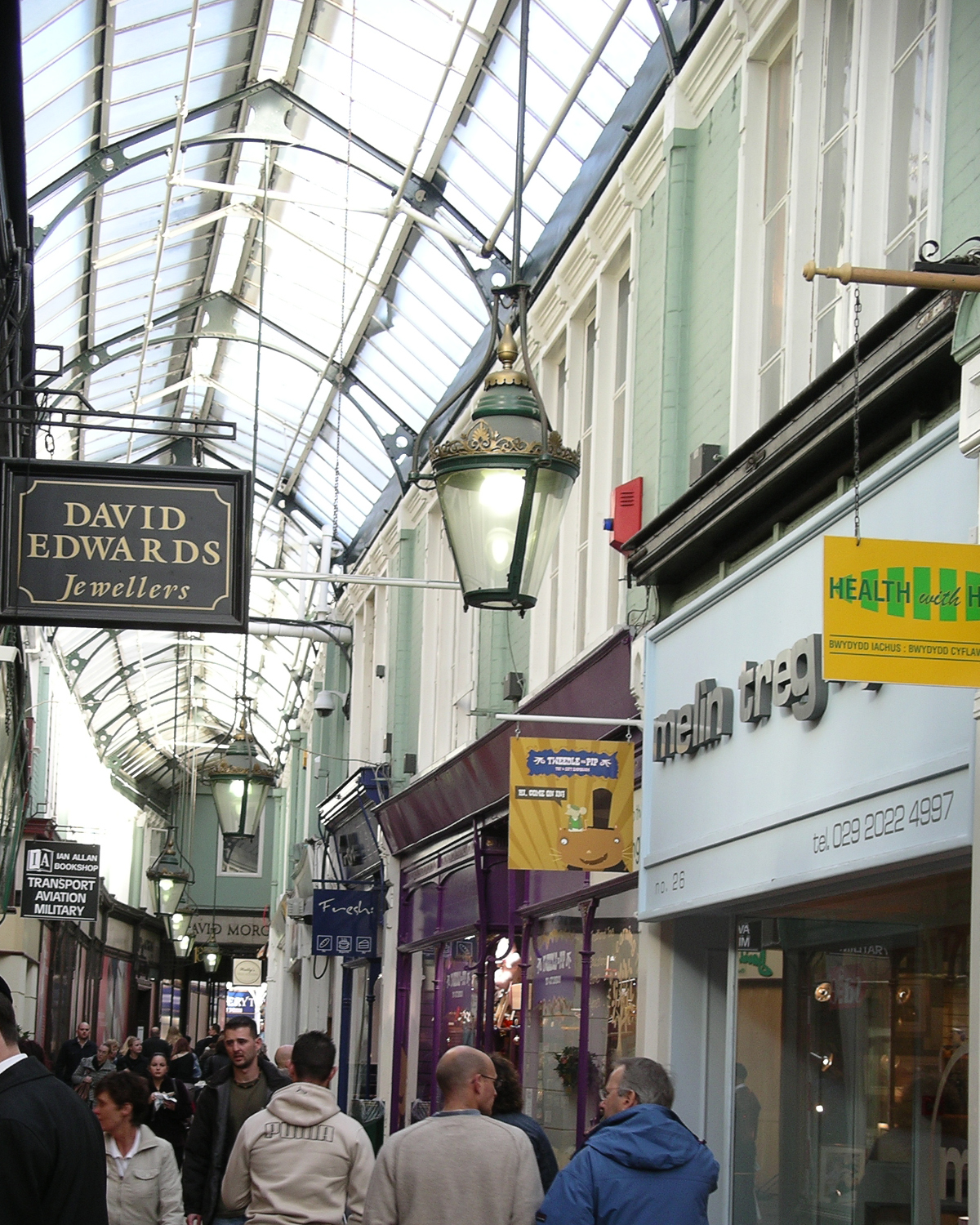
Morgan Arcade

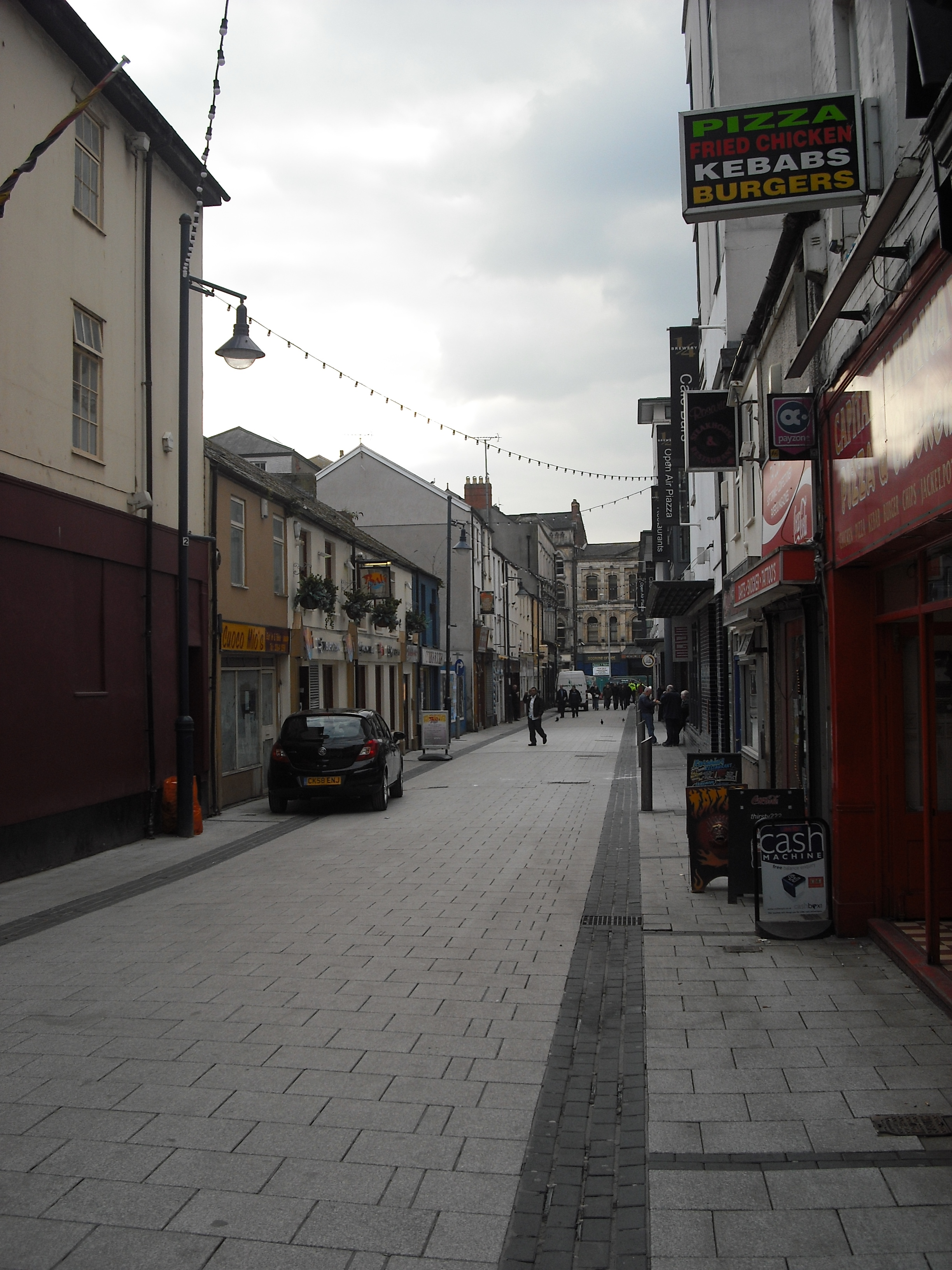
Caroline Street looking south

The Hayes (Welsh: Yr Ais) is where the department store Howells, Bwyty Hayes Island Snack Bar, Spillers Records, St David's Hall, and elegant Victorian arcades are found. At the northern end is Cardiff's Grade II* listed Old Library building (location of the Cardiff Story people's museum).

The Hayes used to be home to David Morgan department store, an historic local landmark that dominated the shop fronts on the western side of The Hayes. Since its closure in 2005, the Grade I‑listed David Morgan Buildings have been subdivided into several retail units, and the upper floors converted into 56 luxury apartments. The exterior of the building received a comprehensive refurbishment, with the street clock being reinstated and the façade being restored to its original design, following many alterations since its construction in the late 1800s.

The eastern side of the Hayes is fronted by the new St. Davids 2 shopping centre. Prior to this it was home to Oxford Arcade, a post war construction that dated quickly and was underused given its central location.

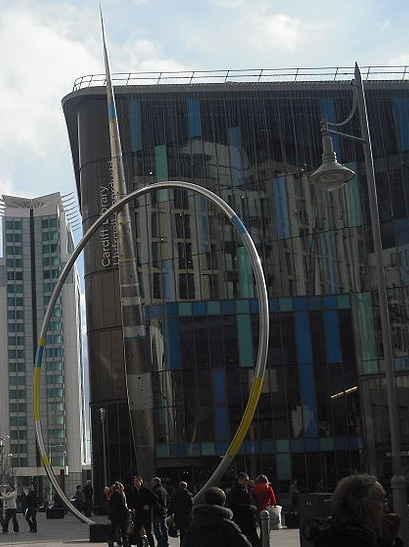
Alliance in front of Cardiff Central Library

The southern end features the John Lewis department store and the new Cardiff Central Library, which opened in March 2009. The previous Central Library closed in 2006 to make way for the construction of the St. David's 2 shopping centre and was located a few hundred yards north-east on Bridge Street.

As part of the St Davids 2 development, the Hayes was pedestrianised and repaved. A new public square was created at its southern end with a large, interactive public artwork as its centrepiece called Alliance, a 25 metres (82 ft) high sculpture consisting of a large stainless steel and enamelled metal ring and an arrow column, which was initially meant to feature lights that would rise and fall with the tide.

=== Caroline Street ===
Caroline Street is a pedestrianised link between St Mary Street and The Hayes. The street has been a host to all kinds of stores but has seen a surge in chip and kebab shops, and as such is commonly known as Chip Lane or Chip Alley. Around 2003, the north side of the street was redeveloped after the demolition of the old Brains Brewery. In its place were luxury flats encircling the Old Brewery Quarter, where new shops, bars and restaurants were erected. The pavement on the street was re‑tiled as part of this development.

== Southeastern city centre ==
=== Callaghan Square ===
This development, built in 1999, extends the central business district south of the mainline railway. Eventually the main development will include approximately 850,000 square feet (77,000 m^{2}) of office space and other uses, of which approximately 350,000 square feet (33,000 m^{2}) is complete (with the largest occupiers being Eversheds and British Gas). Further phases are unlikely to be built on a speculative basis. The initial masterplan suggest that the final phase, yet to be commenced, will also include hotel and residential use. Nearby offices on Tresillian Way (housing The AA, and Lloyds TSB Black Horse finance amongst others) plus further potential developments have turned the area relatively quickly into one of the largest office locations in Central Cardiff. Within a few years total office space in the area will exceed 1 million square feet (90,000 m^{2}).

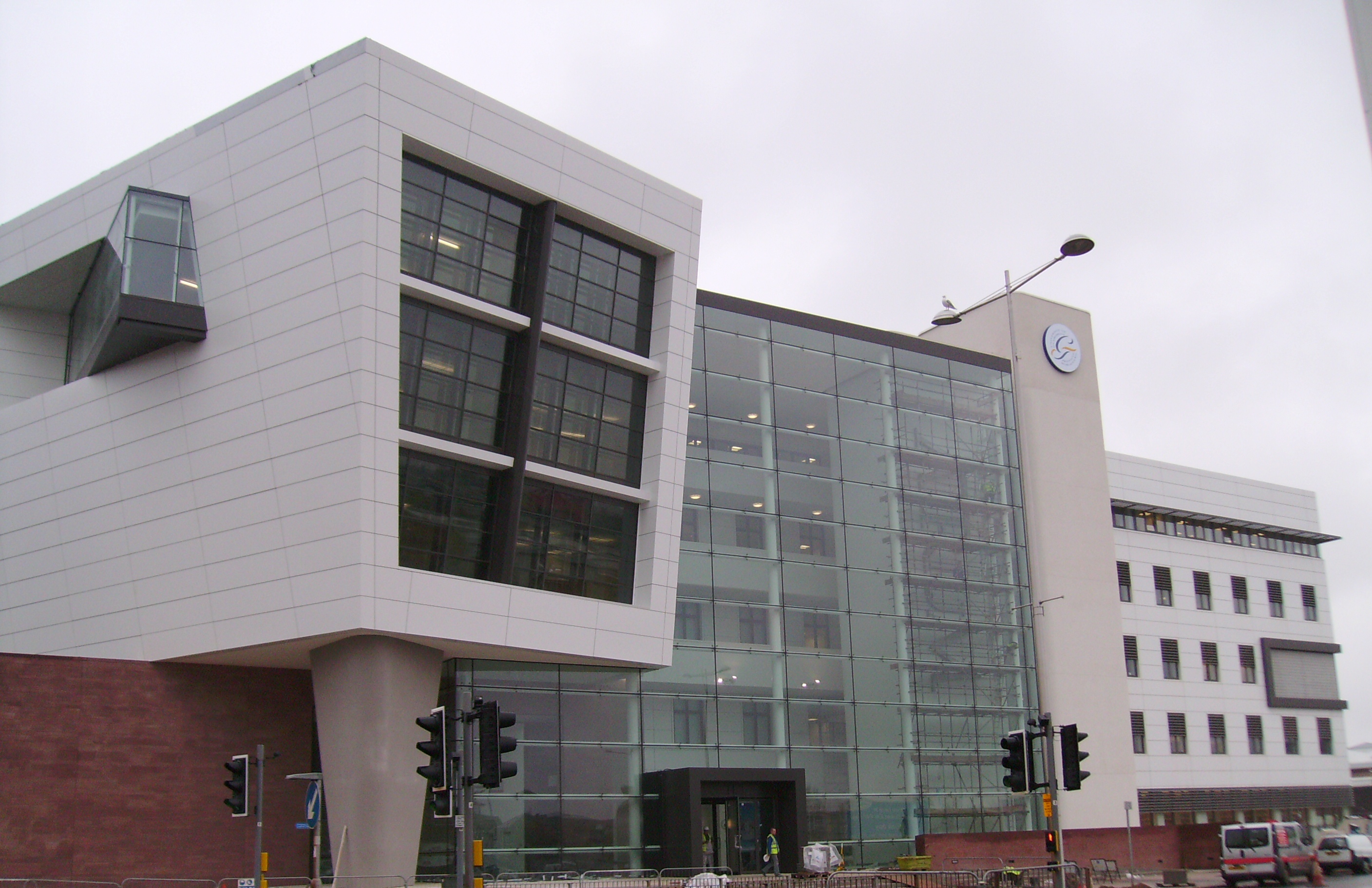
Atrium

=== Custom House Street/Bute Terrace/Adam Street ===
These two roads have traditionally formed the southern and southeastern boundaries of the central business district of Cardiff, and in the 2000s have seen a great deal of new development. Recent developments such as the 23‑storey Altolusso apartment complex, and the Big Sleep Hotel were set to be joined by (from west to east), a new 11‑storey office building (on the site of the 120-year-old Central Hotel – destroyed by fire in early 2003; the Meridian Gate development (consisting of an 11‑storey apartment block and a 21‑storey Radisson SAS Hotel); a new John Lewis department store as part of the St. David's 2 shopping expansion; Harlech Court (consisting of apartments and a rooftop restaurant); the University of South Wales's ATRiuM campus (which opened in 2007) along with the 21‑storey Tŷ Pont Haearn student halls; and 3 further residential towers (of up to 13 storeys) with lower floor retail and commercial use.

== Access ==
From the north, North Road (A470) meets the city centre at the junction with Castle Street and Boulevard de Nantes, with the latter route forming a northern and eastern by‑pass, meeting Newport Road (A4161) and then Callaghan Square, just south of the city centre.

From the west, the centre is accessed from Castle Street (A4161), Wood Street and Penarth Road (A4160), with St. Mary's Street connecting the three, but is restricted to no‑car traffic. Penarth Road terminates at Callaghan Square.

From the south, Lloyd George Avenue (A470), Bute Street and the Central Link (A4234) originate from Cardiff Bay and meet the city centre at Callaghan Square.

== Transport in the city centre ==
=== Bus ===
The vast majority of Cardiff Bus services run to or through the city centre, approaching from the west along either Tudor Street or Westgate Street, from the north along North Road or Newport Road, from the east along Newport Road and from the south along Callaghan Square. Most services circle the city centre, creating a "bus box". Some terminate or pass through Cardiff Central bus station, off Wood Street, which is currently being redeveloped. Other major interchanges include The Hayes, Dumfries Place, Westgate Street, Greyfriars Road and St. Mary Street, with taxi stands being located next to most of these.

The Baycar service circles the city centre every 10 minutes before continuing to Cardiff Bay.

=== Rail ===
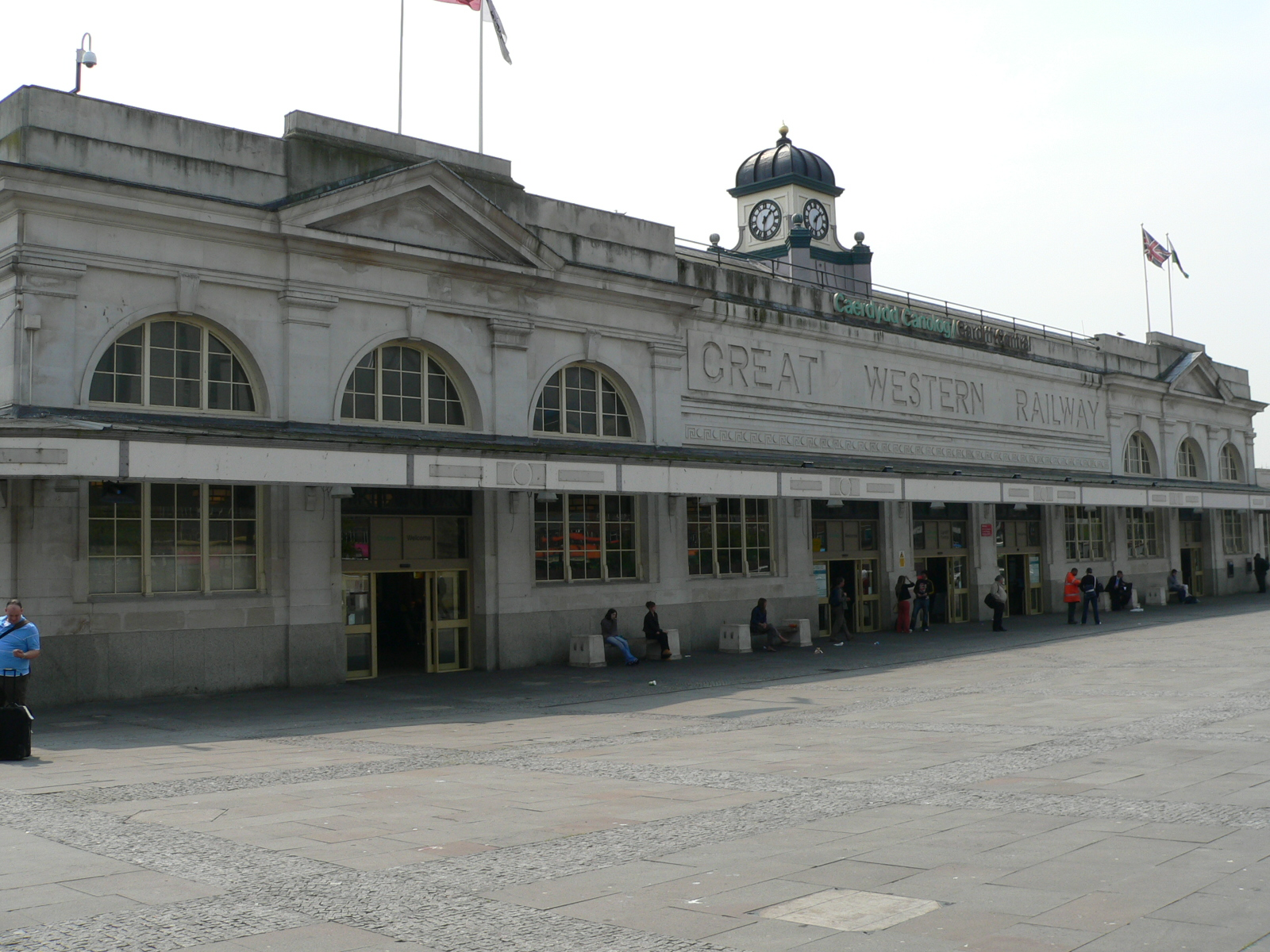
Cardiff Central station

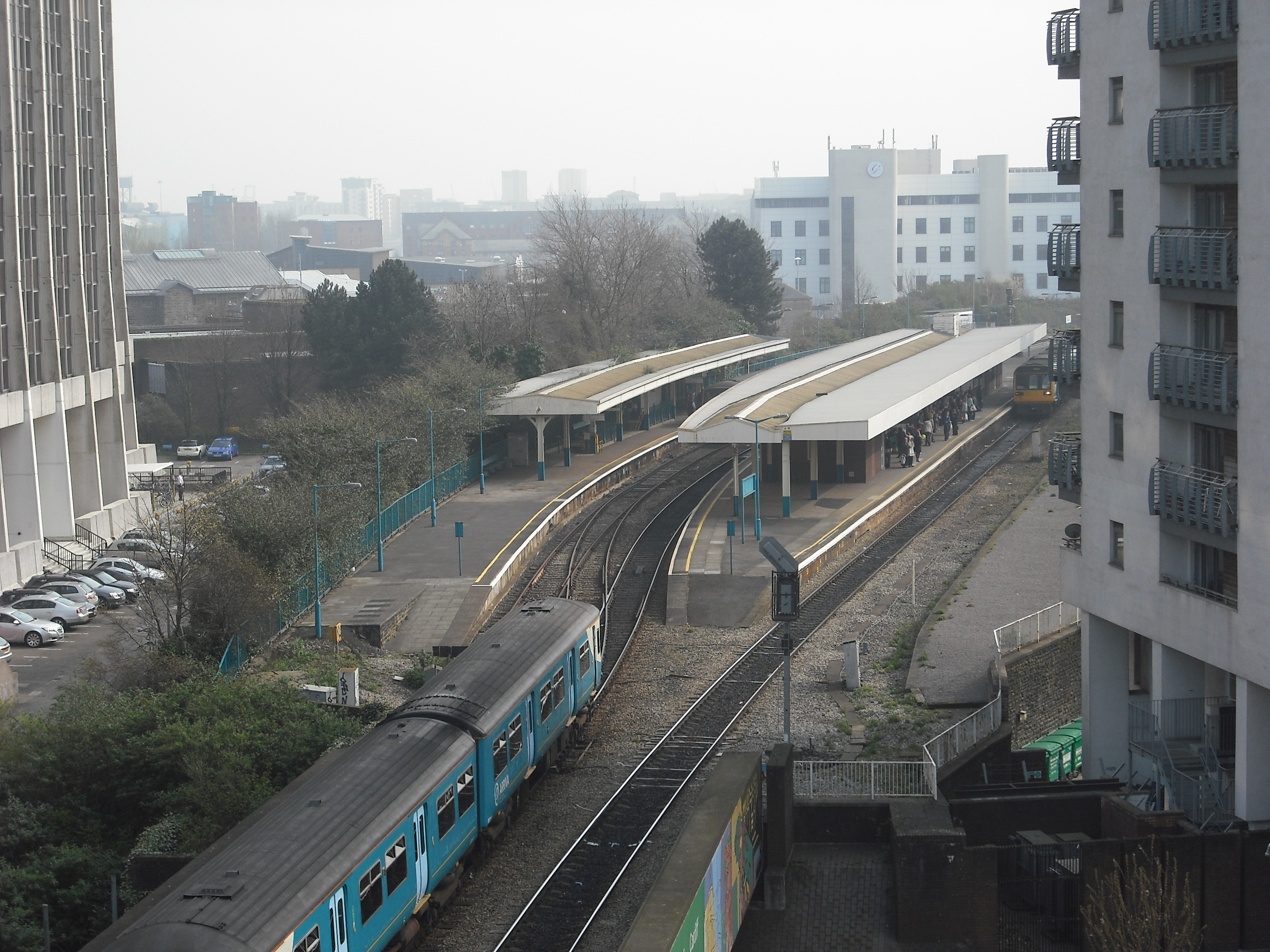
Cardiff Queen Street station

The city centre is served by two railway stations. Cardiff Queen Street is in the east of the centre and is the city's main hub for urban services to the rest of Cardiff, its valleys and the Vale of Glamorgan. Cardiff Central, located in the south of the city centre, is the largest station in the city and one of the busiest in the United Kingdom, focusing on mainline services. Central railway station is located next to Central bus station forming an interchange.

Cathays railway station, Grangetown railway station and Ninian Park railway station are all within 1.5 miles (2.4 km) of the centre serving edges of the city centre.

=== Road ===
The A470 bypasses the centre to the east running southbound to Cardiff Bay and northbound to North Cardiff, Pontypridd, Merthyr Tydfil and Brecon. The A470 road meets the A4232 at Cardiff Bay, leading to Culverhouse Cross and the M4 motorway, and also meets the A48 Carmarthen–Gloucester road at Gabalfa, north of the centre.

Some city centre taxis can be hailed. They are usually, but not always, black with a white bonnet or hackney carriages.

=== Water ===
The Cardiff Waterbus has stops at Cardiff Castle and Taff Mead Embankment, next to the Millennium Stadium, with services to Cardiff Bay.

=== Cycle ===
A cycle hire system, similar to those in other large cities, launched in September 2009, and included 70 bikes and 35 hire points (initially 7) around the centre and the south of the city. The cycle hire system was shut down in 2012. In early 2018, Nextbike offered a new cycle hire scheme with docking stations throughout the city.

== See also ==
- List of tallest buildings in Cardiff
