= Meridian Gate, Cardiff =

Meridian Gate
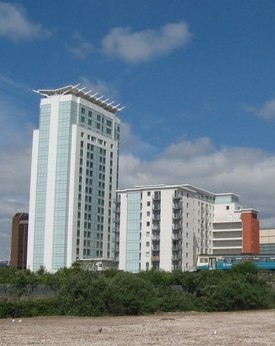
- Radisson Blu hotel (left) and Meridian Plaza (right)
- Interactive map of the Meridian Gate area

General information
- Type: Residential and Hotel
- Location: Cardiff, Wales, Bute Terrace, Cardiff city centre
- Coordinates: 51.4769°N 3.1737°W
- Construction started: 2007
- Completed: 2009
- Cost: £30,000,000/$34,083,000
- Client: Imperial Properties Ltd
- Owner: Radisson Blu (hotel), Delph (apartments)

Height
- Height: 63 metres

Technical details
- Floor count: 21
- Floor area: 250,000 sq ft

Design and construction
- Architecture firm: Wigley Fox Architects.ltd
- Structural engineer: RVW
- Services engineer: McCann
- Other designers: John Wootton, Miller Group, Distinction Contract (Furnishings)
- Main contractor: Miller Group

Meridian Gate (Welsh: Porth Meridian) is a hotel and residential skyscraper complex in Cardiff, Wales. It has two buildings, the taller of which is 63 metres high, has 21 floors, and is operated by Radisson Blu. It is the joint-fifth tallest building in Cardiff. The smaller building, Meridian Plaza, is 33 metres high, has 11 floors, and contains luxury residential apartments.

== History ==
Meridian Gate

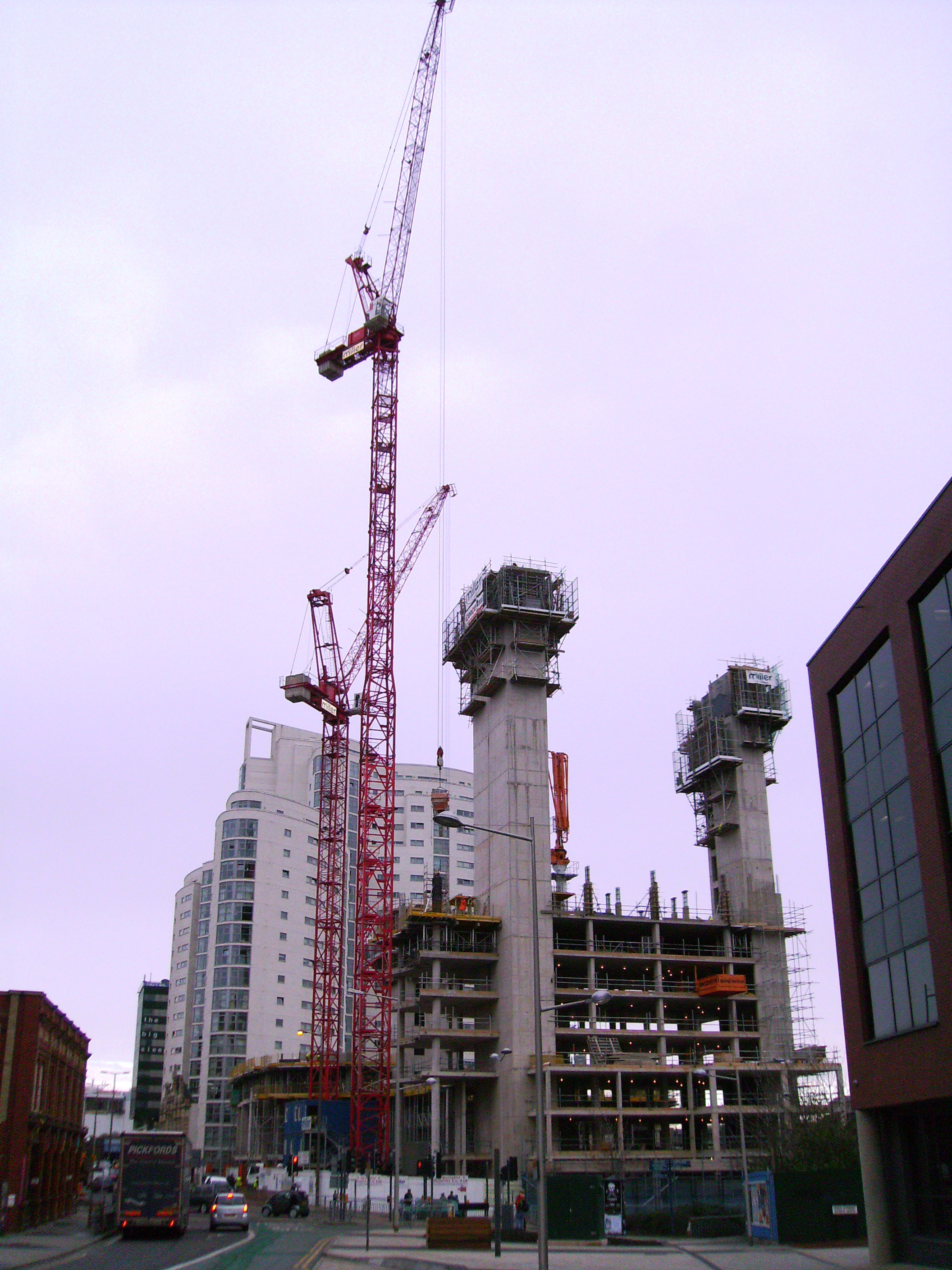
Meridian Gate during construction in 2007

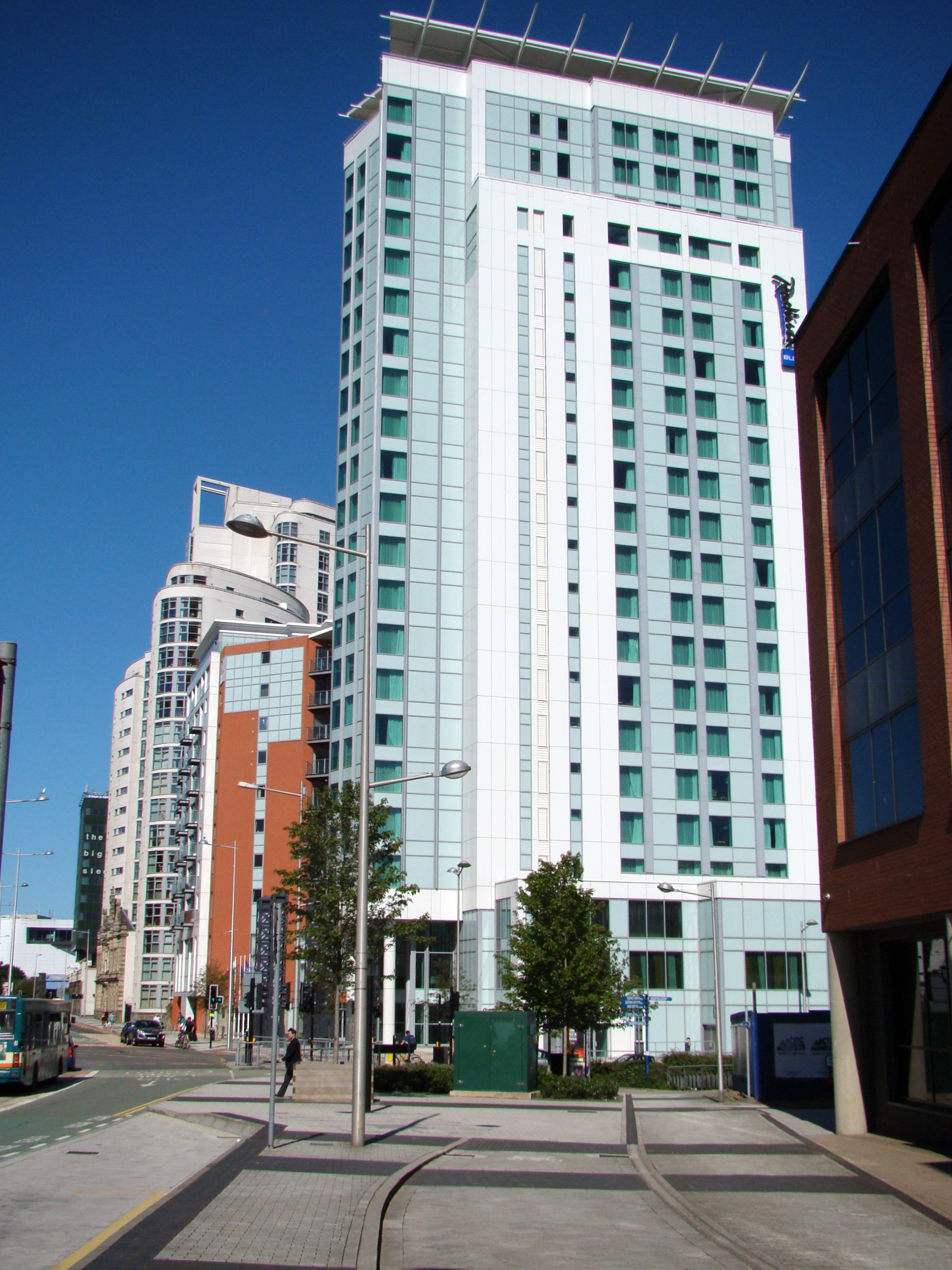
Meridian Gate in 2011

The building was proposed in early 2004, obtaining planning consent shortly afterwards. A full application was submitted in 2006 after a change of developer. The site was bought by Radisson Blu.

The building topped out in mid-2008.

== Architecture and design ==
The public open space is a mix of hard and soft landscaping. The Barcelona lights were retained but moved, and a statue of Jim Driscoll was placed on an elevated stone plinth. A few parking spaces are allotted, given the central location: 40 spaces allocated for residents, and 35 for the hotel in anticipation that 80% of hotel users use public transport.

The hotel tower has a glazed curtain walling with solar reflective glass and aluminum projecting fins. The intention was to broadly follow the finishes and colors on Callaghan Square and Kingsway.

=== Review recommendation ===
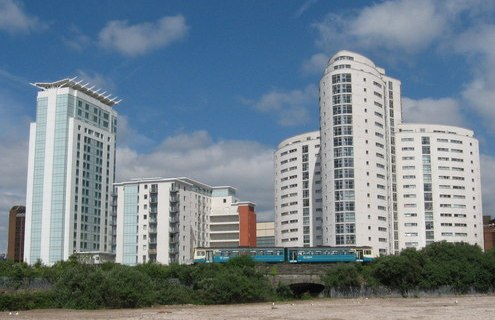
Meridian Gate and Altolusso to the right

A concern of the review panel of the Design Commission for Wales was that the building needed to respect the height of the neighboring Altolusso building, another of Cardiff's tallest buildings. Consequently, a slight change in the spacing between the westernmost wing of the Altolusso and the new residential tower was made.

== Hotel facilities ==
The hotel has 215 rooms on 21 floors, two bars, a restaurant, and health spa. There are six meeting rooms and a ballroom that provide a capacity of 350 people. The pre-conference area has a capacity of 150.

== See also ==
- List of tallest buildings in Cardiff
