= Cardiff Central Library =

Main public library in Cardiff, Wales

- Llyfrgell Ganolog Caerdydd
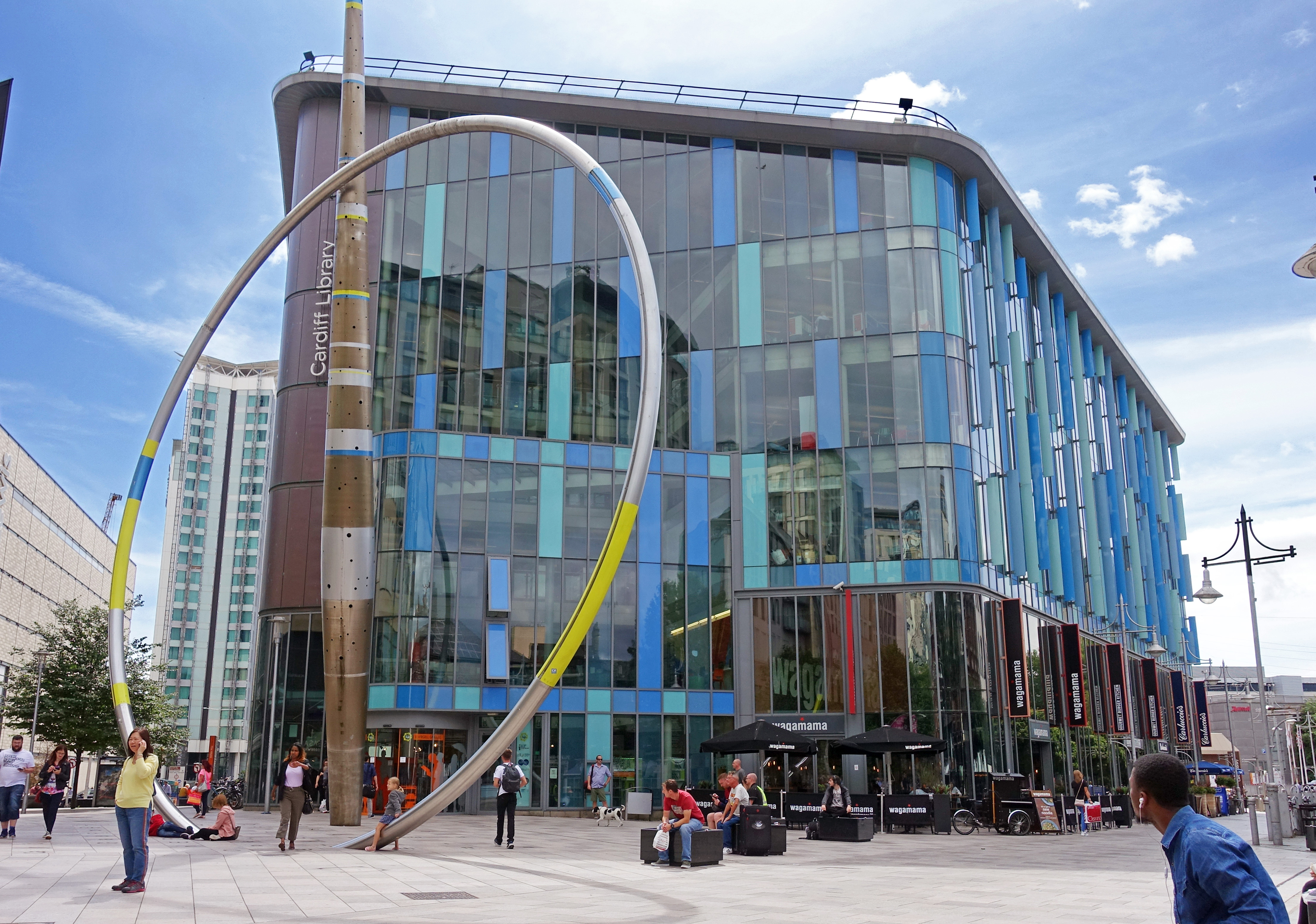
- The Alliance sculpture in front of Cardiff Central Library

General information
- Architectural style: Sustainable architecture
- Location: Mill Lane, Cardiff, CF10 1FL
- Coordinates: 51.477860°N 3.175470°W
- Construction started: May 2007
- Completed: 30 January 2009; 17 years ago
- Inaugurated: 14 March 2009; 17 years ago
- Cost: £13.5 million
- Owner: Cardiff County Council

Technical details
- Floor count: 6
- Floor area: 55,000 square feet (5,100 m^{2})

Design and construction
- Architecture firm: BDP Architects
- Services engineer: Crown House Technology
- Main contractor: Laing O'Rourke
- Type: Public Library
- Established: 14 March 2009

Collection
- Size: 122,664

Access and use
- Access requirements: None

Other information
- Website: Official website

Cardiff Central Library (now Cardiff Central Library Hub) (Welsh: Llyfrgell Ganolog Caerdydd) is the main library in the city centre of Cardiff, Wales. It offers a public library service and is open six days a week. Four buildings have been named as such, with the newest building opening on 14 March 2009 and officially being opened a few months later on 18 June 2009 by the Manic Street Preachers. The first Cardiff library was opened in 1861 as the Cardiff Free Library, later expanded and known as the Cardiff Free Library, Museum and Schools for Science and Art.

== History ==
=== Cardiff Free Library (1861 to 1882) ===
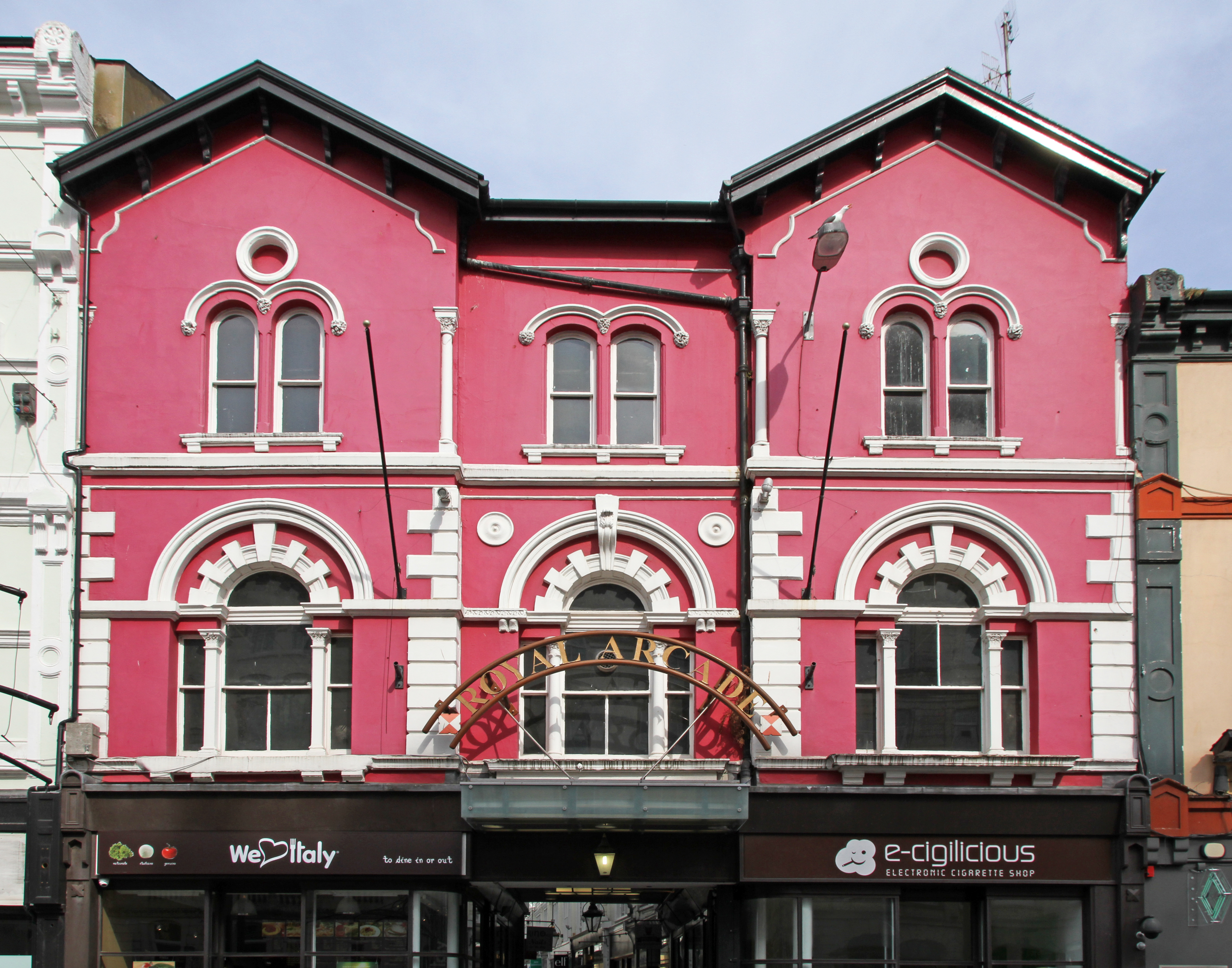
Cardiff Free Library above the Royal Arcade

In 1861, a free library was set up by voluntary subscription above the St Mary Street entrance to the Royal Arcade in Cardiff. By 1862, the Public Libraries Act 1855 allowed local councils with 5,000 inhabitants or more to raise a rate of one penny in the pound to provide a public library. Cardiff was the first town in Wales to establish a public library.

Two years later in 1864, the library had moved to bigger premises in the now demolished YMCA building in St Mary Street. A School of Science and Art and a small museum was also added, and so it became known as the Cardiff Free Library, Museum and Schools for Science and Art.

=== Old Library (1882 to 1988) ===
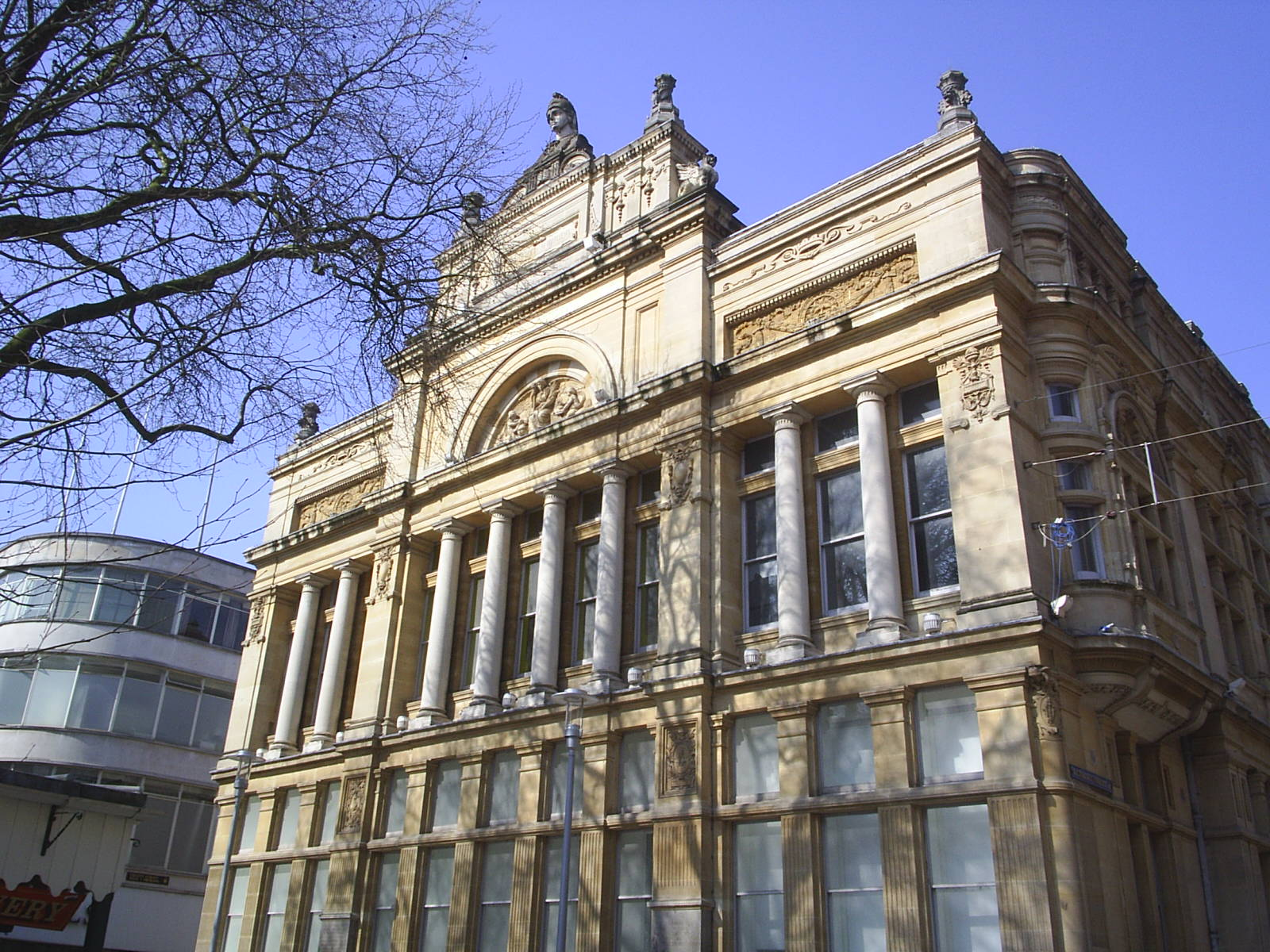
Cardiff Free Library, Museum and Schools for Science and Art, now known as the Old Library

The Old Library is located at the northern end of The Hayes. A public holiday was declared when it was opened on 31 May 1882 by the Lord Mayor of Cardiff, Alfred Thomas as the Cardiff Free Library, Museum and Schools for Science and Art, which included an art gallery. A competition was held to choose a design for the Cardiff Free Library, Museum and Schools for Science and Art. The winning design was by architects James, Seward and Thomas, erected for just over £9,000. The Schools of Science and Art were housed in the building until 1890 when it moved to buildings that were part of the University College.

The building was further extended to the south fourteen years later, with a new south frontage designed by James, Seward & Thomas, and was officially re-opened as the Central Library by the Prince of Wales on 27 July 1896.

The entrance to the building featured a corridor lined with ornamental wall tiles, designed to depict the four seasons and night and morning. These tiles were impressed with coloured clay to give the impression of a mosaic. This together with the stained glass installed throughout the building saw it become a Grade II* listed building. The Old Library (as it is now known) still exists and is in used by the Cardiff Story and a tourist information centre.

=== St David's Link (1988 to 2006) ===
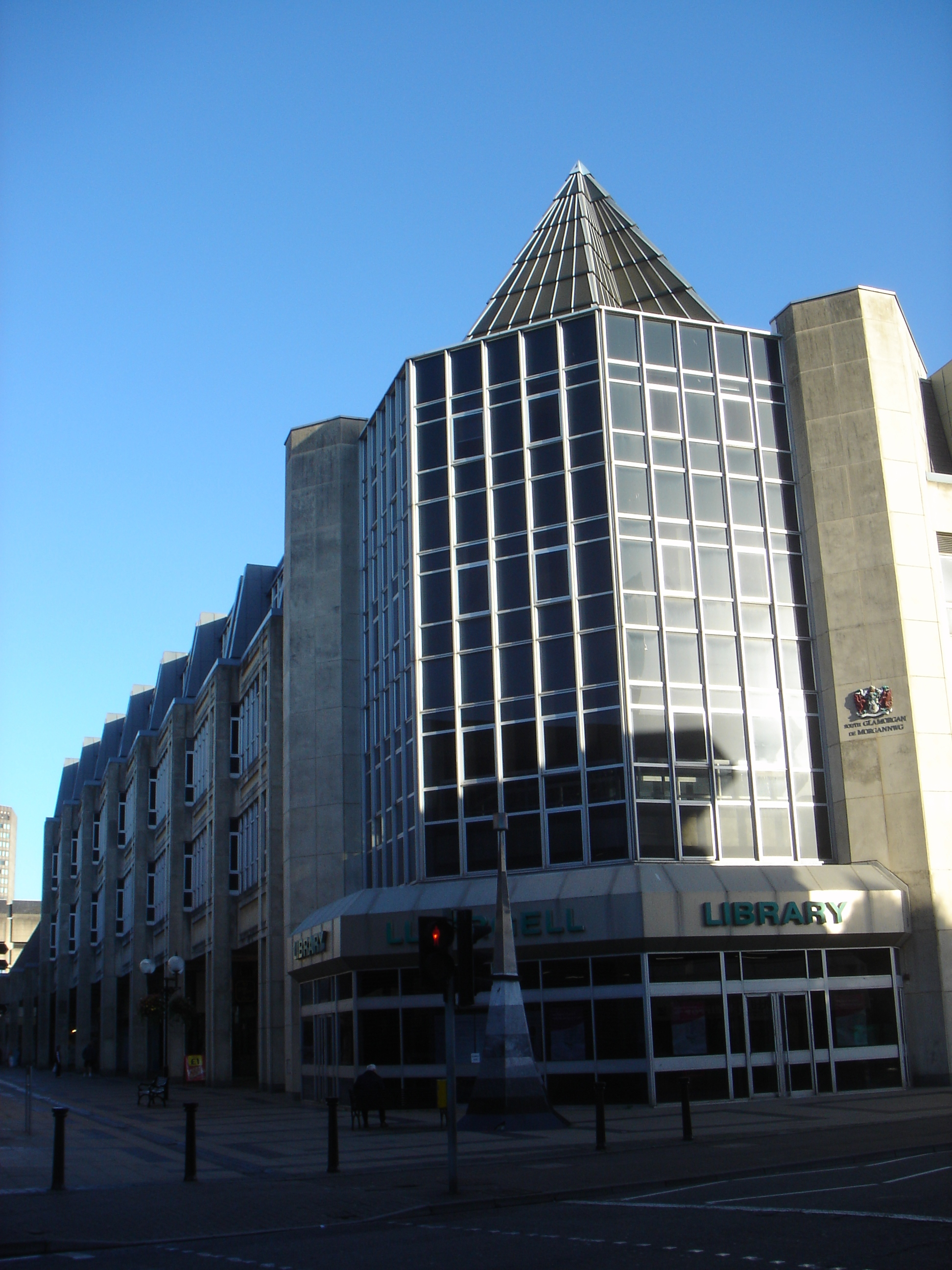
St David's Link (1988 to 2006), now demolished

The Central Library was moved to a new building located on St David's Link (Frederick Street), opposite what was then the multi-storey car park. The building was officially opened on 3 December 1988, and occupied the upper storeys of the commercial complex, which were accessed via a polygonal vestibule at street level.

The first floor contained the fiction and children's sections and reading library. The second floor contained the non-fiction section and the third floor housed the local history section.

The building was demolished in late 2006 together with the surrounding retail units to make way for the extension to St. David's Centre.

=== Temporary building (2006 to 2009) ===
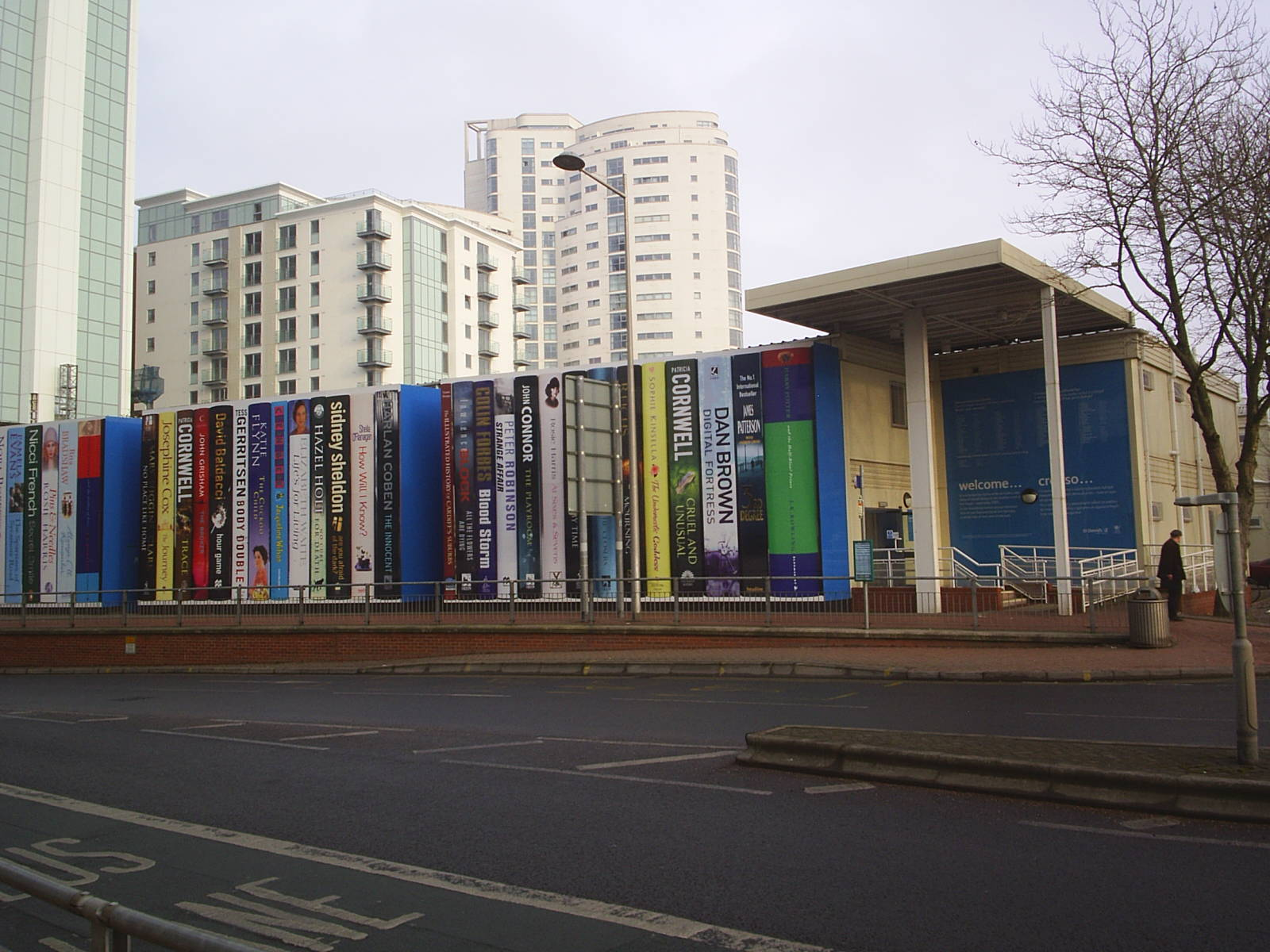
The temporary library on John Street (2006 to 2009), now demolished

During the construction of the new building, library services were moved to temporary facilities on John Street which were officially opened on 1 September 2006. Consisting of two separate buildings adjoining the Welsh National Opera, the front overlooking Bute Street, featured 6-metre (20 ft) tall hoardings illustrating the spines of a number of books identified as those most commonly borrowed from the library.

== Cardiff Central Library (2009– ) ==
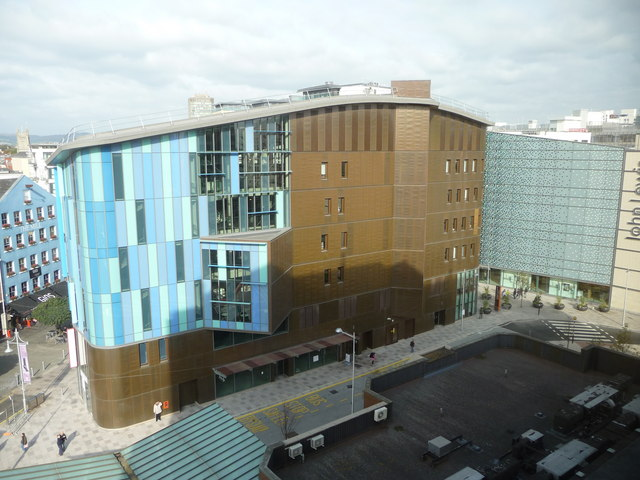
The present day library along Canal Street

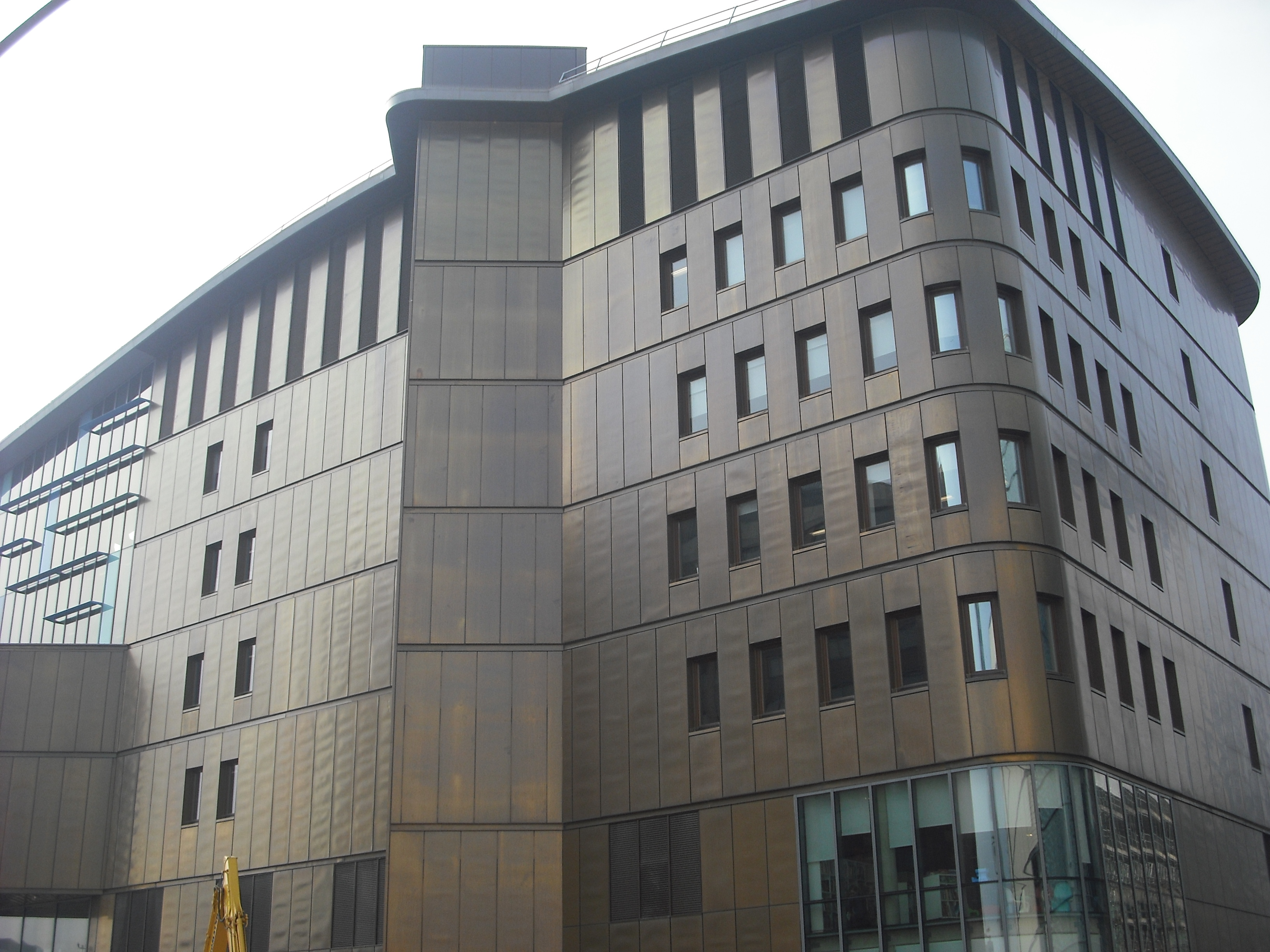
The rear elevation of the building

The present day Central Library building is located on The Hayes, cornered in between Mill Lane and Canal Street, opposite the St. David's 2 development. It occupies part of the car park previously used by the adjacent Marriott Hotel, and it was this site which gave rise to the building's triangular footprint.

Cardiff Council commissioned architects BDP to create a landmark buildings which symbolised the values of knowledge, learning and culture. Construction started in 2007. The building cost £13.5 million to build and construction took 98 weeks involving nearly 1,200 workers. 2000m² of glass form part of the exterior walls. The length of shelving for the books totals 3 kilometres. The project included 16000m² of restaurant units on the ground floor facing onto Mill Lane.

It was opened on 14 March 2009 and on 18 June the Manic Street Preachers unveiled a plaque with the words "libraries gave us power", from their 1996 single A Design for Life.

At the time of opening, the library contained 55,000 ft (17,000 m) of space, 90,000 books, 10,000 of which are written in Welsh, and an additional 10,000 CDs and DVDs.

Since 2011 Cardiff Council have co-located services in library buildings, renaming them Hubs. At Central Library this has included money advice, housing and citizens advice services being installed in the building and book stock allegedly reduced. In 2015 over 200 library users, community groups and authors joined unionised library staff to stage a rally outside the library on National Libraries Day against proposed cuts to the service.

=== Building features ===
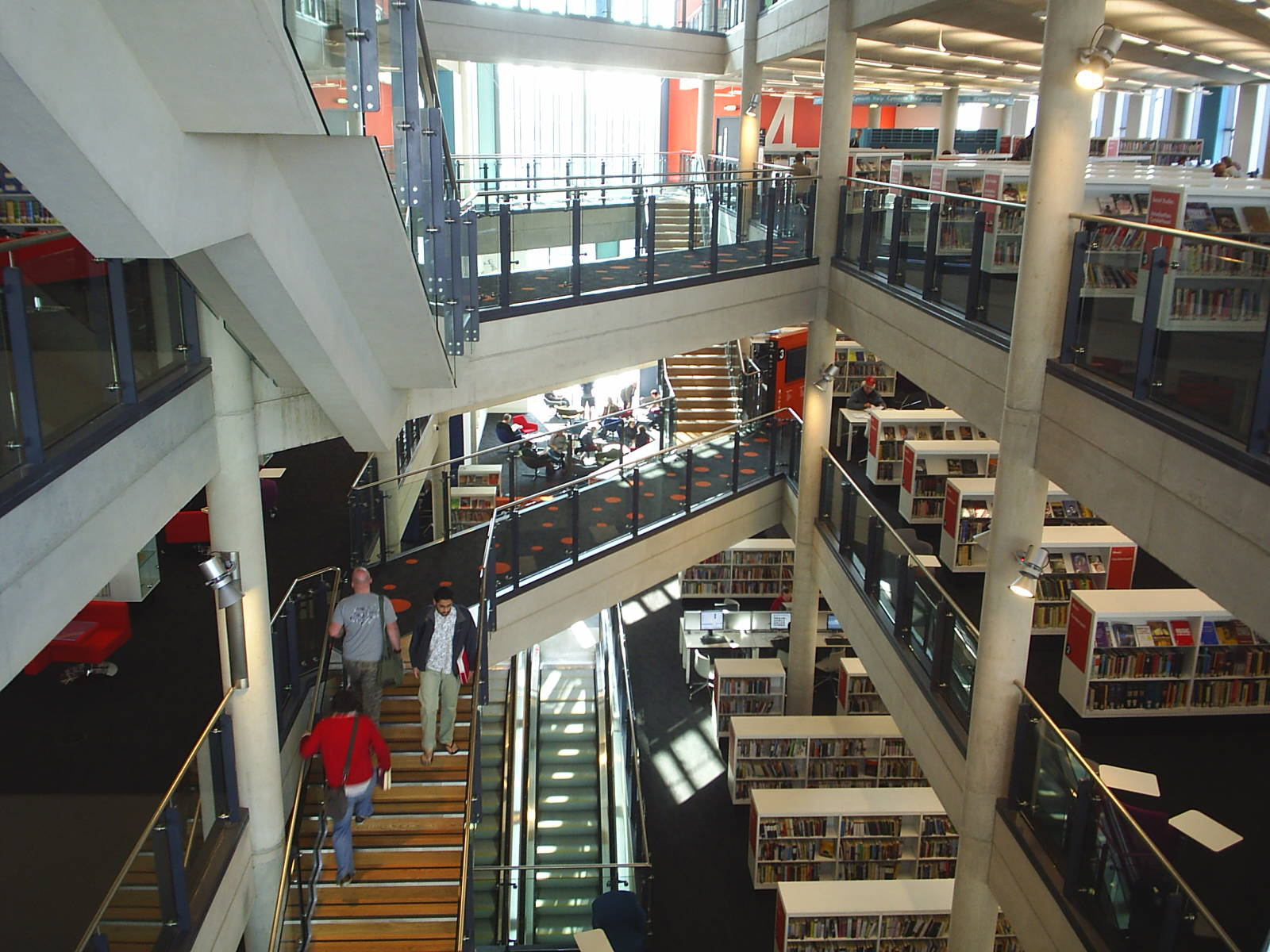
The interior of Cardiff Central Library

The building was specifically designed to be energy-efficient, and includes a sedum grass roof to improve insulation and reduce rainwater run-off, coloured glass panels and solar shading to prevent excessive heat gains, and a full Building Management System to provide climate control to individual floors. As a result of these measures the building was awarded a BREEAM rating of 'excellent'. Panels of brass cladding covered the side and rear façade of the library, intended to give the impression of leather-bound bookends.

There are a total of six floors with part of the ground floor housing three retail outlets, initially occupied by branches of Wagamama, Gourmet Burger Kitchen, and Carluccio's.

Additionally, all floors except the ground floor have toilets and Wi-Fi. Lifts link all floors. Stairs also connect each floor, with an escalator running straight from the ground floor entrance foyer to the second floor.

== Notable librarians ==
Notable staff have included Harry Farr who served 1891 until 1940, Sir John Ballinger, Wales' first national librarian, James Ifano Jones who worked as a Welsh language cataloguer, Arthur Ap gwynn and more recently, puppeteer Toby Philpott.

== Rare books sale controversy ==
To help fund the new library, Cardiff Council planned to sell off the library's heritage book collection, dating from the 15th century. The collection included a rare Tyndale's Bible in addition to private collections donated by the Bute and Cory families. This provoked outrage amongst academics worldwide. On 10 March 2010, a joint initiative of the council, Cardiff University, the Welsh Assembly Government and the Higher Education Funding Council for Wales worked to transfer the books to the library collections at Cardiff University.
