= Altolusso =

Coordinates: 51.47746°N 3.17254°W

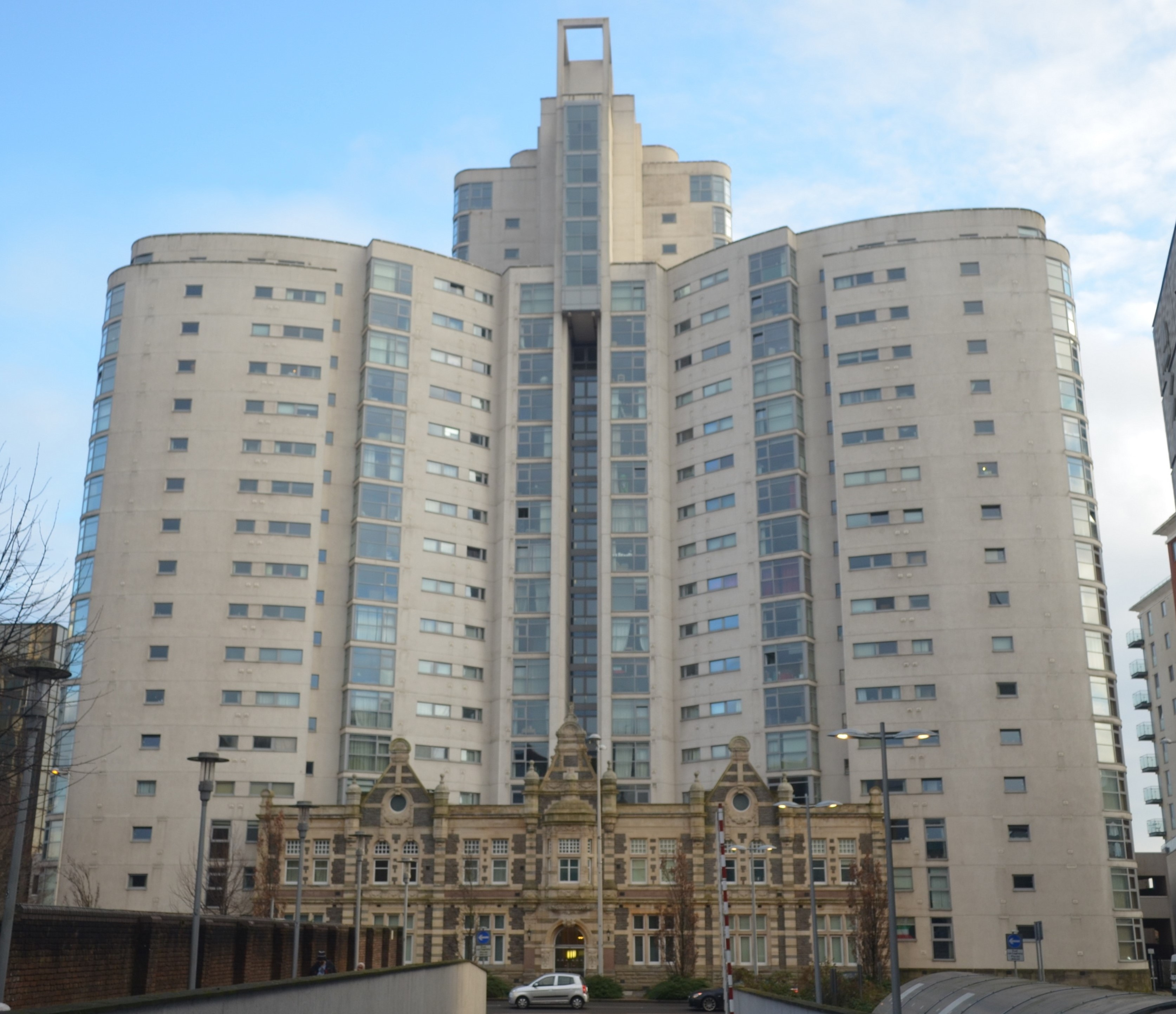
- Interactive map of the Altolusso area

General information
- Type: Residential
- Location: Cardiff, Wales, Bute Terrace, Cardiff CF10 2FF
- Current tenants: Consort Property Management
- Construction started: 2003
- Completed: 2005
- Cost: £40,000,000 ca.
- Client: Redrow Homes
- Owner: Freehold Managers

Height
- Height: 72 m (236 ft)

Technical details
- Floor count: 23
- Floor area: 19 697 m² (212,020 sq ft)
- Lifts/elevators: 4

Design and construction
- Architect: Holder Mathias Architects
- Structural engineer: Ove Arup & Partners
- Services engineer: McCann & Partners
- Main contractor: Laing O'Rourke

Altolusso (meaning "high luxury" in Italian) is a residential building in Cardiff, Wales. The building is 72 metres (232 ft) high and has 23 floors. The tower was the tallest residential building in Wales upon its completion in 2005, and remains one of the tallest buildings in Cardiff and in Wales.

The Y-shaped building contains 292 luxury one to three-bedroom apartments with views across the city. A three-storey car park allocated to the property. Altolusso is located close to The Hayes area of Cardiff city centre, near Cardiff International Arena and Cardiff Queen Street railway station.

== History ==
Historically, the site had been used for the production and storage of coal gas since 1837; when the Cardiff Gas Light and Coke Co established their facilities in Bute Terrace (formerly known as Whitmore Lane). The majority of the buildings remaining on site that were demolished in order for the scheme to proceed dated from the 1890s with some minor additions and modifications during the 1960s and 1990s.

== Architecture ==
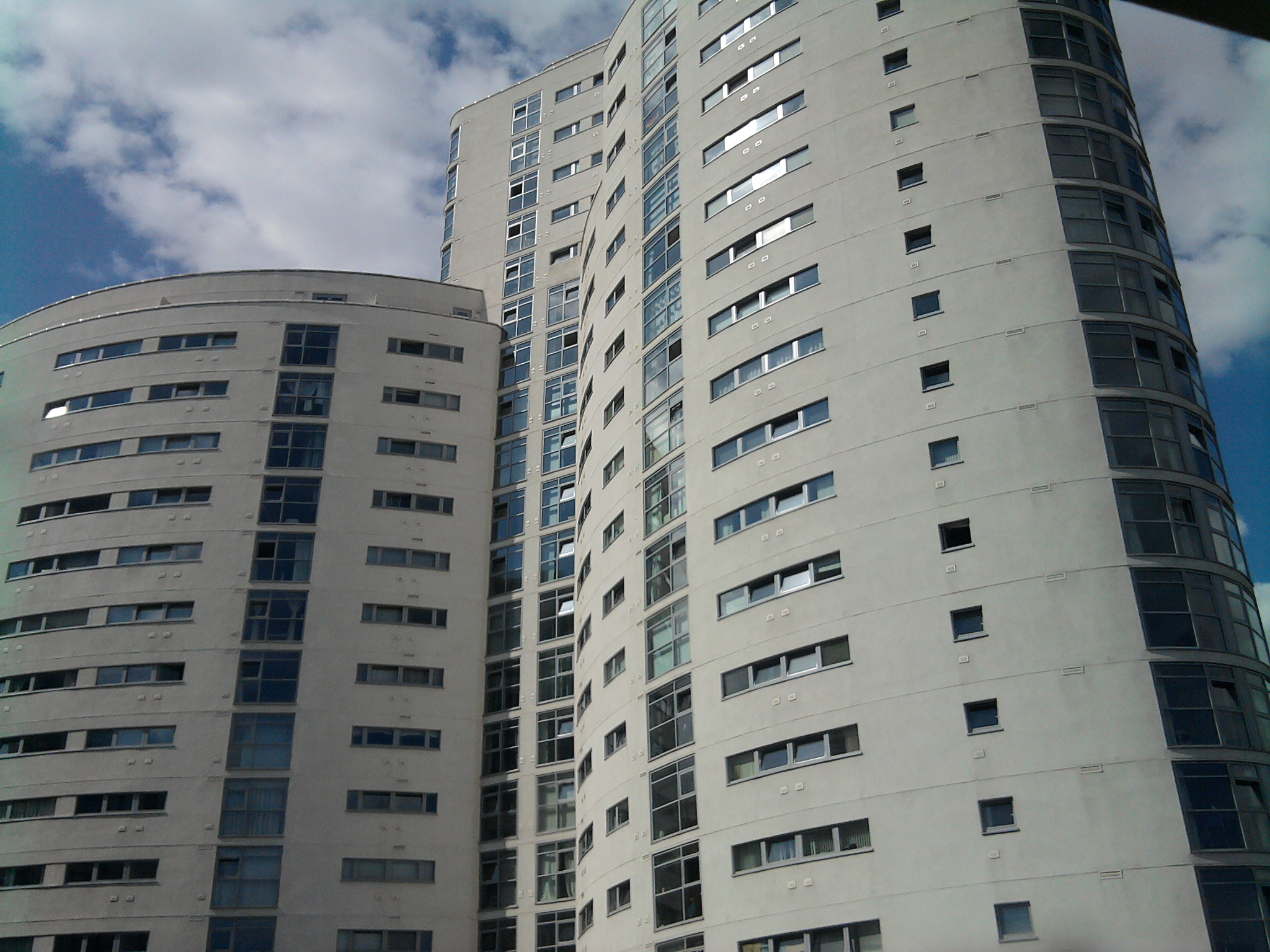
Altolusso

Situated on the site of the former New College, the property retains the Victorian façade of the college for the first two floors. The façade is not listed, but was retained at the request of Cardiff Council during the planning application. It had fallen into a poor state of repair by 2003, and modifications had been made over the years (such as a driveway leading through to the rear buildings). Extensive renovation and reconstruction of the façade was carried out using stone blocks from some of the rear buildings that were demolished. The façade forms part of the three-storey main foyer with a glass atrium roof. The design of the building forms a three-leaf clover with three sweeping curvilinear wings emerging from a central service and access core.

The design intended not just to enhance the appeal of the development, but it was necessary to retain a high level of flatness and smoothness through the selection and application of the building's acrylic-based render to provide the building with durability and resilience against harsh weather conditions.

== Location ==
The building is bounded to the north by Bute Terrace, which forms part of the Cardiff inner distributor box, to the south by the main South Wales Main Line, to the east by Harlech Court with a car park and four-storey office building on a first floor podium and to the west by Meridian Gate, formerly a five-storey office building occupied by Axa Insurance. Its 3-4m high Victorian masonry and brick retaining wall defines the southern boundary of the site while the dock feeder, an artificial water course, passes the south eastern corner.

== Use in media ==
Altolusso has been used during filming for the science fiction TV series Torchwood, which is filmed and produced in Cardiff. Filming took place on 8 June 2006, and shows the main character, Jack Harkness, standing on top of the building overlooking Cardiff.

== See also ==
- List of tallest buildings in Cardiff
