= Alliance (sculpture) =

Sculpture in the centre of Cardiff, Wales

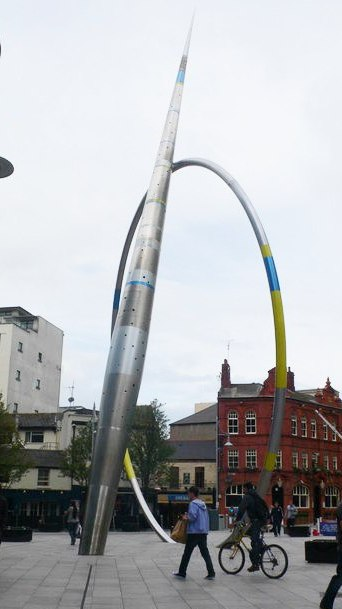

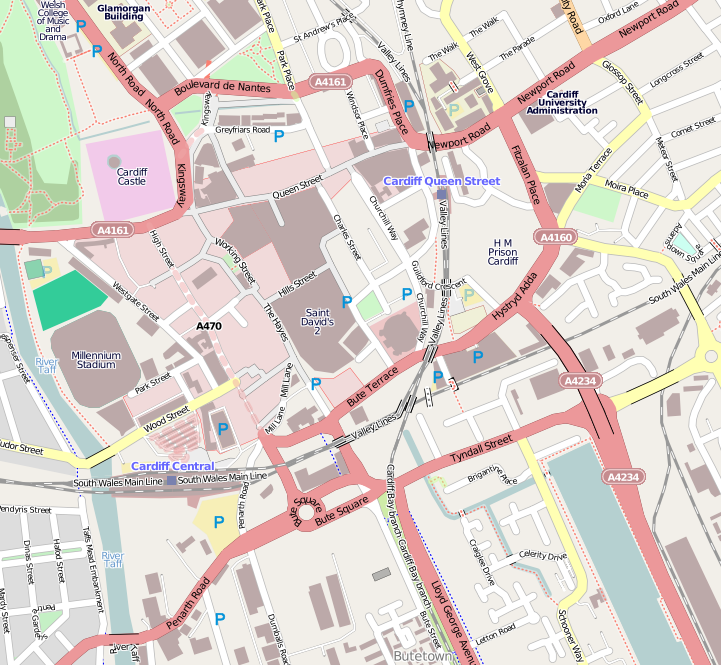
- Location of Alliance in Cardiff city centre
- Artist: Jean-Bernard Métais
- Year: 2009
- Type: Metal sculpture
- Dimensions: 25 metres (82 ft) tall 17 metres (56 ft) diameter
- Location: The Hayes, Cardiff; 51°28′40.8″N 3°10′31.44″W
- Owner: St David's

Alliance is a 25-metre-high (82 ft) sculpture in the centre of Cardiff, Wales, created by Paris installation artist Jean-Bernard Metais. It consists of a large, partly enamelled, stainless steel arrow, and a hoop that glows in the dark. It was financed by the St David’s shopping centre as part of a £1.5m public art scheme in the city centre, and was unveiled on 3 December 2009.

== Design ==
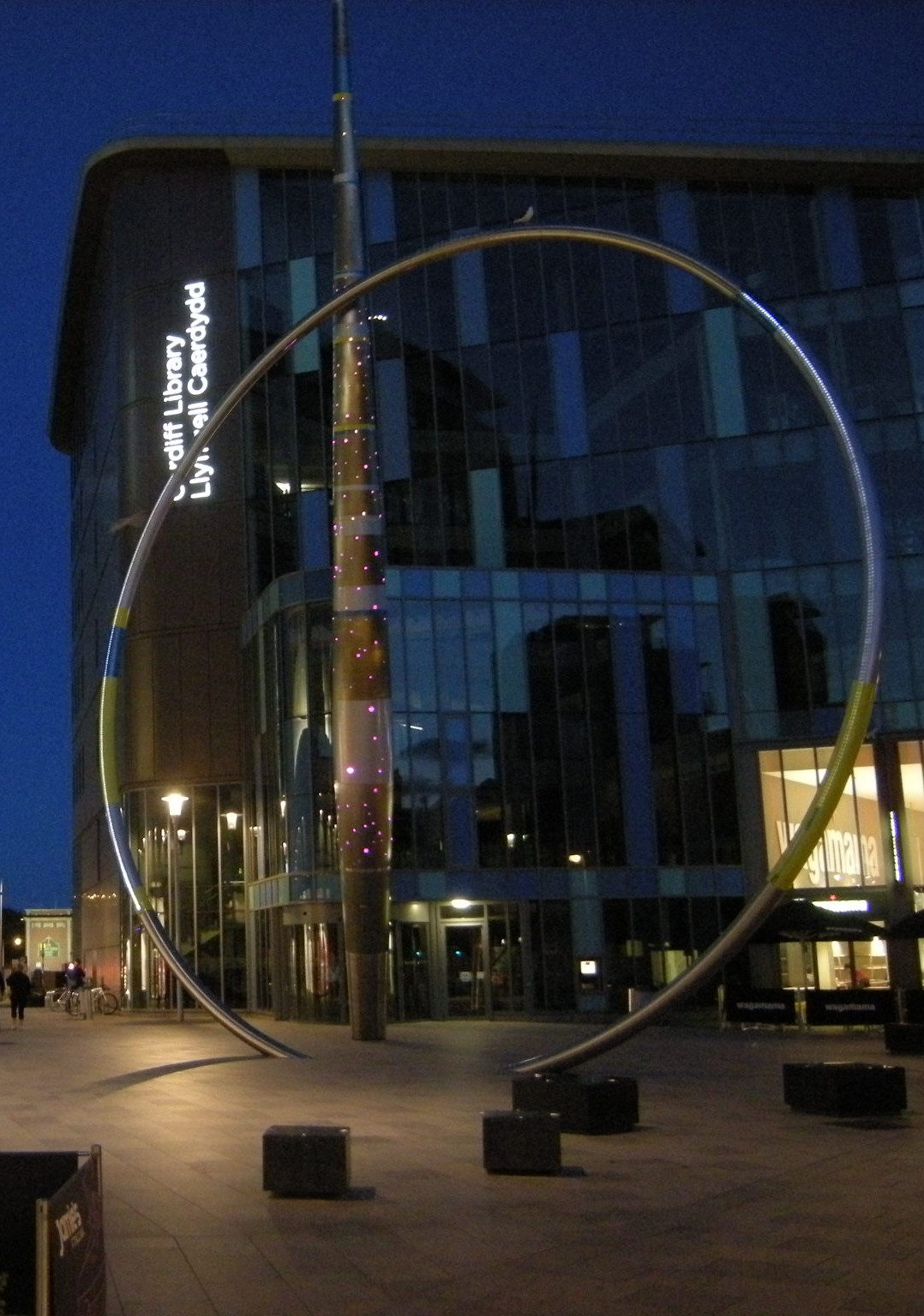
Alliance by night, showing the pinpricks of light on the arrow, as well as the partial glow of the hoop.

Alliance's arrow and hoop seem to balance in the air. The hoop, filled with a phosphorescent liquid, is partially submerged below the pavement, with a mechanism programmed to make it rise and fall with the Bristol Channel tides. Métais describes the piece as "an organic clock" which "connects the place with the people".

Words in both English and Welsh, written by Cardiff-based poet Peter Finch, are projected onto the pavement at night by equipment installed within the arrow. According to the developers, the text is a play on the word Cardiff, reflecting its history and the present day.

== Commissioning ==
The sculpture was commissioned following a national competition to find the right piece of artwork that would fit well within the city and become a new landmark. A total of 120 responses were received from artists across the globe, with just five shortlisted – England's Tony Cragg, Lulu Quinn and John Kennedy, New York City's Roxy Paine, and Métais. There was concern that no Welsh artists were shortlisted; however, Wiard Sterk, representing the Welsh public arts body Safle, emphasised that Welsh artists had been considered throughout the St David's 2 commissioning programme.

Métais had created artworks for cities around the world, including Allotted-Time Eclipse, an elaborate hourglass at Jardin des Plantes, France's leading botanical garden. Alliance was judged to have sufficient scale for the location at the end of The Hayes, which would sit between the multilevel Central Library, the John Lewis department store, and the St David's complex itself.

== Construction ==
Work to erect the sculpture began on 16 November 2009 and was completed within a fortnight. The sculpture was brought into the city centre on three articulated lorries and lifted into place by crane. Alliance touches the ground in three places, and its foundations are three metres deep.

== Reception ==
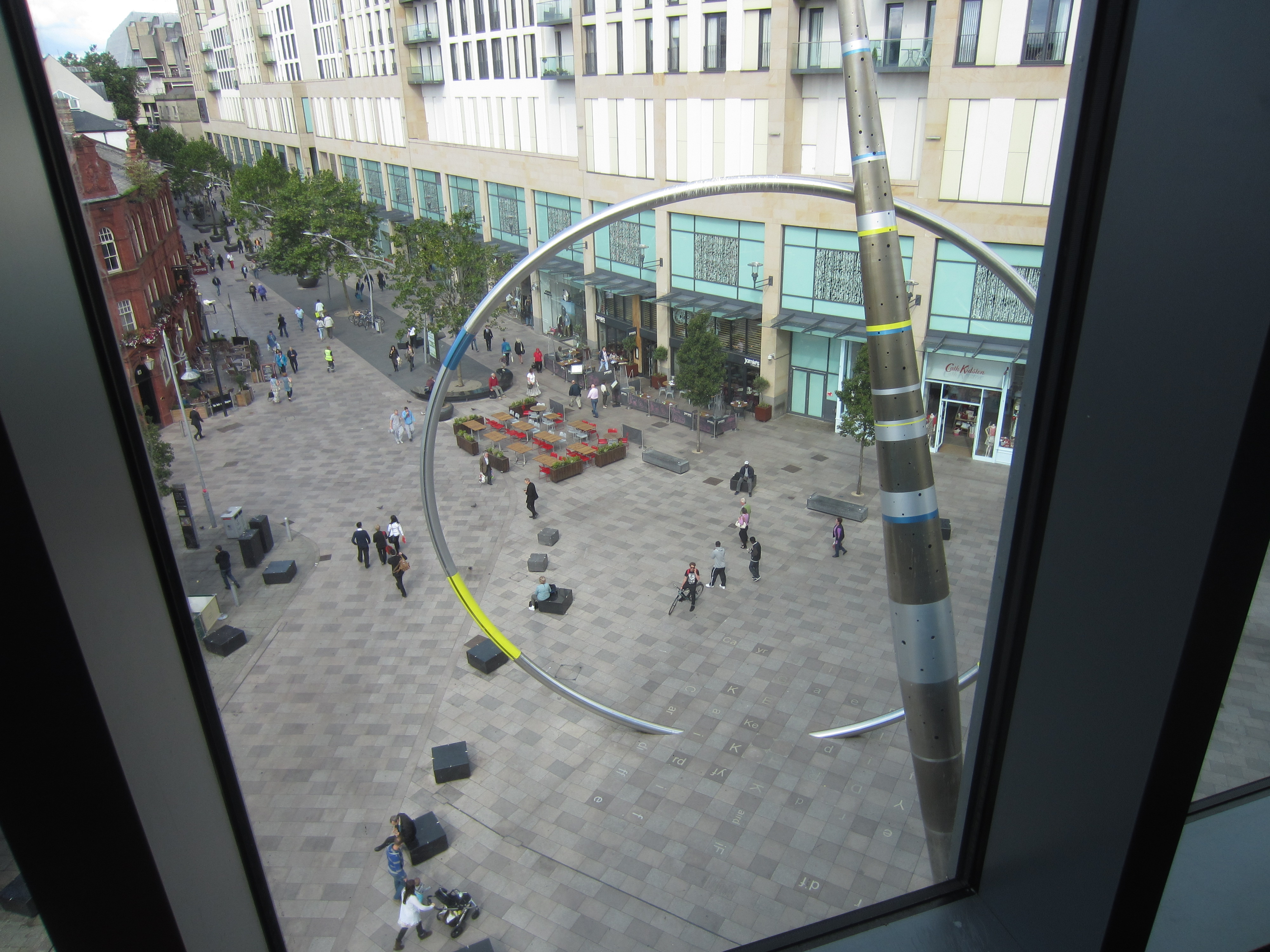
View of Alliance Sculpture from inside Cardiff Central Library

Describing the letters etched beneath the sculpture, poet Mab Jones described Alliance as "impressive", saying "Cardiff has poetry ... etched on her skin. I mean this literally."
