= David Firman =

British composer, arranger, conductor, musician and musical director)

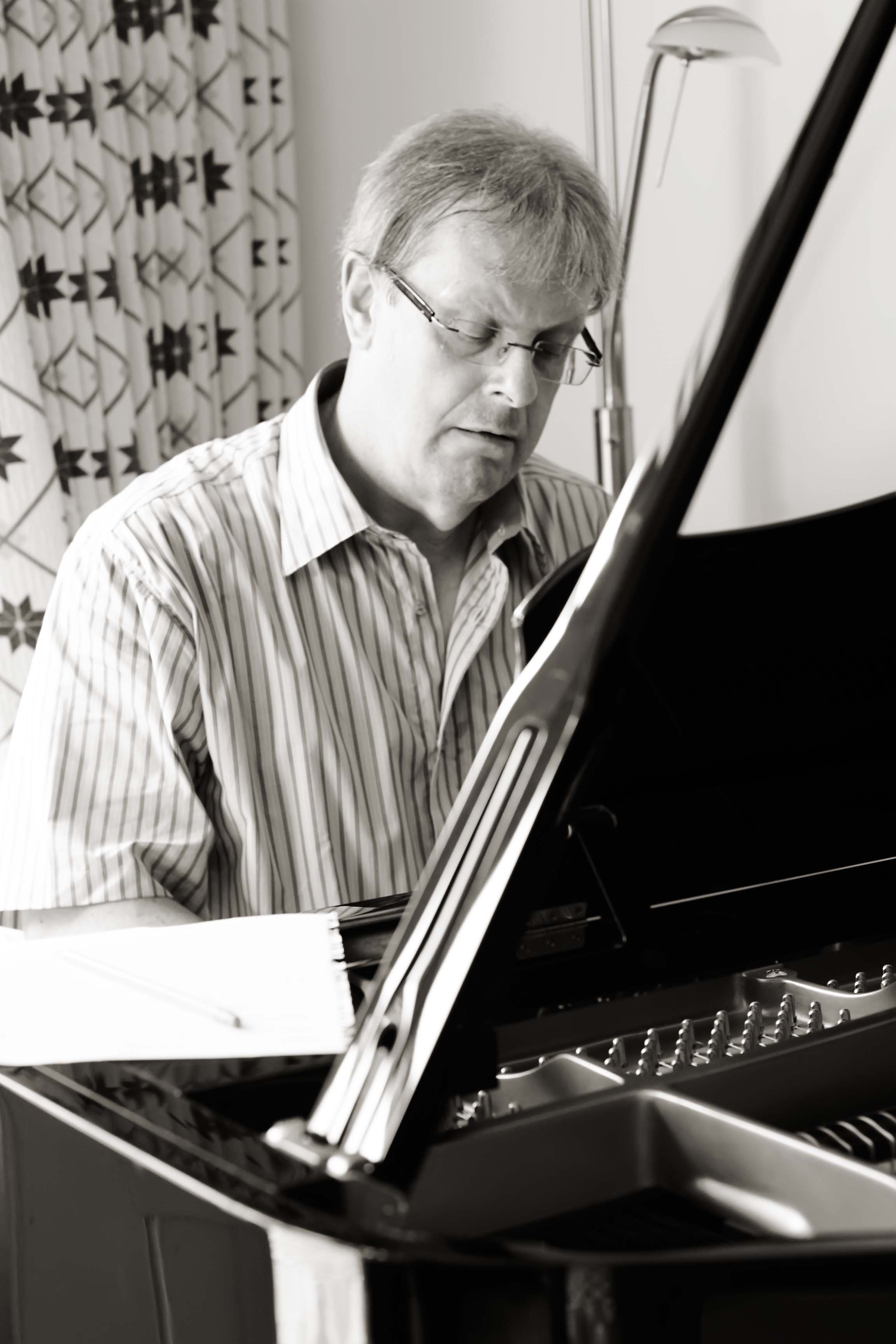

Background information
- Born: London
- Occupations: composer arranger conductor musical director musician
- Years active: 1980–present
- Label: Metropolis Records
- Website: davidfirman.com

David Firman is a British orchestral conductor, musical director, composer and arranger. He is known for conducting premiere West End productions, and as arranger and musical director for several British television productions and series. Firman has conducted performances in the Royal Albert Hall and internationally.

== Early life and education ==
Firman was born in London and educated at Trinity College of Music and Magdalene College, Cambridge, where he was Organ Scholar. He graduated in English and Music. Whilst at Cambridge he was musical director of Footlights Dramatic Club.

== Career ==
Firman conducted the original West End productions of Jesus Christ Superstar, Evita, Cats, Chicago, Singing in the Rain, Dancin', The Pirates of Penzance, Children of Eden, Phantom of the Opera, Enter the Guardsman, Metropolis. The reviewer for The Independent called Firman's orchestrations for Enter the Guardsman, "superb", noting that they "add(ed) colour to an elegant score in Jeremy Sams's neat production." As a keyboardist he played on the recording sessions for Return of the Jedi, Superman, Supergirl, Medicine Man, First Blood, Rambo ll, Basic Instinct, Tombstone, DARRYL, and Total Recall. He conducted the soundtracks of Savage Islands, The Tall Guy, Rambo 3 (final reel), A Long Day Closes, and The Tie That Binds.

For television, Firman acted as musical director and arranger for Victoria Wood: As Seen on TV, Dinnerladies, Victoria Wood with All the Trimmings, Bryn Terfel at Christmas, The Mike Doyle Show (3 series), Parkinson with Victoria Wood, and Victoria Wood BAFTA tribute. Firman was Principal Guest Conductor for the Danish Sinfonietta from 1990 until their dissolution in December 2014. He arranged and conducted many of their concerts and broadcasts, including performances with Tommy Körberg, Simply Red, Ray Davies, Katie Melua, Westlife, Shu-bi-dua, Stig Rossen, Inger dam Jensen, Jerry Hadley, Harolyn Blackwell, Dee Dee Bridgewater, Robin Gibb, Paddy Moloney, Sissel Kyrkjebo, Sir Christopher Lee, The Bootleg Beatles, Lars Lillholt, Jean-Michel Jarre and Elaine Paige. He conducted over 20 concerts with Procol Harum in London, Europe and in the USA, notably in 2006 at Ledreborg Schloss for Danish television (and subsequent DVD release). In London Firman conducted the annual concert series Night of a 1000 Voices at the Royal Albert Hall (director Hugh Wooldridge), and Chess in Concert with Idina Menzel, Josh Groban, Marti Pellow, Kerry Ellis, and Clarke Peters. Firman also conducts the Best of Broadway series at the Royal Albert Hall with the Royal Philharmonic Orchestra, and conducts the orchestra frequently in other venues.

Firman conducted the world premiere performances of Frozen - Live in Concert, and the British premiere of Pirates of the Caribbean - Live in Concert, both at the Albert Hall with the Royal Philharmonic Orchestra, and has also conducted Disney's Fantasia with the same orchestra, along with the European premiere of Beauty and the Beast - Live in Concert. He has conducted orchestras in Hanover, Singapore, Bangkok, Beijing, Ottawa, Sydney, Tokyo, Odense, Aalborg, Antwerp, Aarhus, Stockholm, Rome, Barcelona, and Copenhagen. Firman composed the orchestral score for the ballet Kom Bamse, nu balletter vi! which is part of the repertoire for the Royal Danish Ballet in Copenhagen.
