= Jim Driscoll =

Welsh boxer (1880–1925)

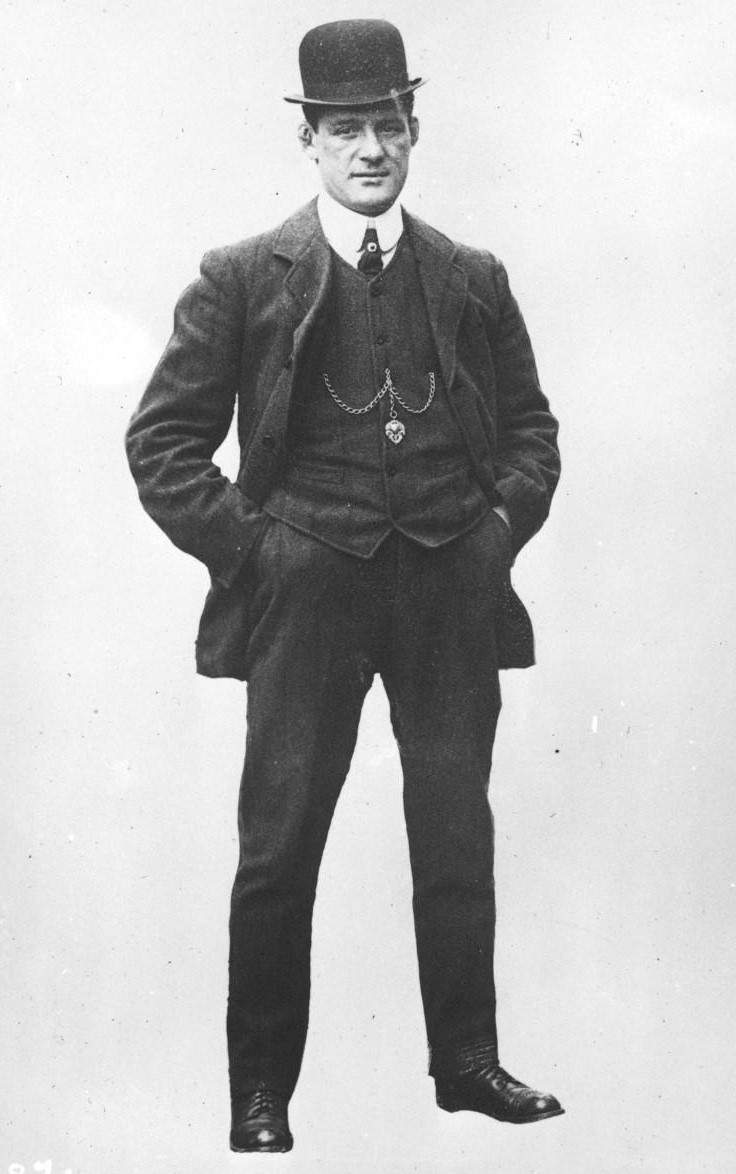
- Driscoll in 1914

Personal information
- Nickname: Peerless/Jem Driscoll
- Nationality: Welsh
- Born: James Driscoll; 15 December 1880 Cardiff, Wales
- Died: 30 January 1925 (aged 44) Cardiff, Wales
- Height: 5 ft 4.5 in (164 cm)
- Weight: Featherweight

Boxing career

Boxing record
- Total fights: 77
- Wins: 58
- Win by KO: 39
- Losses: 3
- Draws: 6
- No contests: 4

James Driscoll (15 December 1880 – 30 January 1925), commonly known as Peerless Jim, was a Welsh boxer who learned his trade in the boxing ring and used it to fight his way out of poverty. Driscoll was British featherweight champion and won the coveted Lonsdale belt in 1910. He is a member of the Welsh Sports Hall of Fame, the Ring Magazine Hall of Fame, and the International Boxing Hall of Fame.

== Early life ==
Driscoll was born in Cardiff in 1880 to Cornelius and Elizabeth, and was brought up on Ellen Street in the Newtown region of the town. Driscoll's parents were both Irish, and both Catholicism and the local St Paul's Church would be key in his life. Driscoll never forgot his roots; According to the National Monuments Record for Wales, his first fight was in a barn in Great House Farm, Llandough. He was a faithful supporter of his church, remained close to his community, and had great affection for the Nazareth House Orphanage, for whom he once gave up the chance of becoming Featherweight Champion of the World.

Driscoll's father died in a goods yard accident before Driscoll was one. His mother was forced to accept parish relief to bring up her four children, and soon the family moved into a boarding house with another five people in 3 Ellen Street. Elizabeth was forced to take a job shovelling vegetables and fish from the hulls of ships at Cardiff Docks. Growing up in poverty, Driscoll took employment while still a boy, becoming a printer's devil for the Evening Express in St. Mary Street in Cardiff.

== Boxing career ==
=== Early history ===
Driscoll was an apprentice with the Western Mail printing works, when he began boxing in the fairground booths of south Wales. He fought on the boxing booths of South Wales for a number of years and had somewhere in the region of 600 fights before turning professional in 1901, and by the end of the year he had secured twelve wins without defeat. The following year, of the seven recorded fights, he only failed to win once, a draw with Harry Mansfield in Cardiff. Between 1903 and 1904 Driscoll continued fighting, mainly in Wales, but on 22 February 1904 he fought his first match at the National Sporting Club in London, a points decision win over Boss Edwards. That year he also suffered his first defeat in a return bout against Mansfield, losing by points in a ten-round clash.

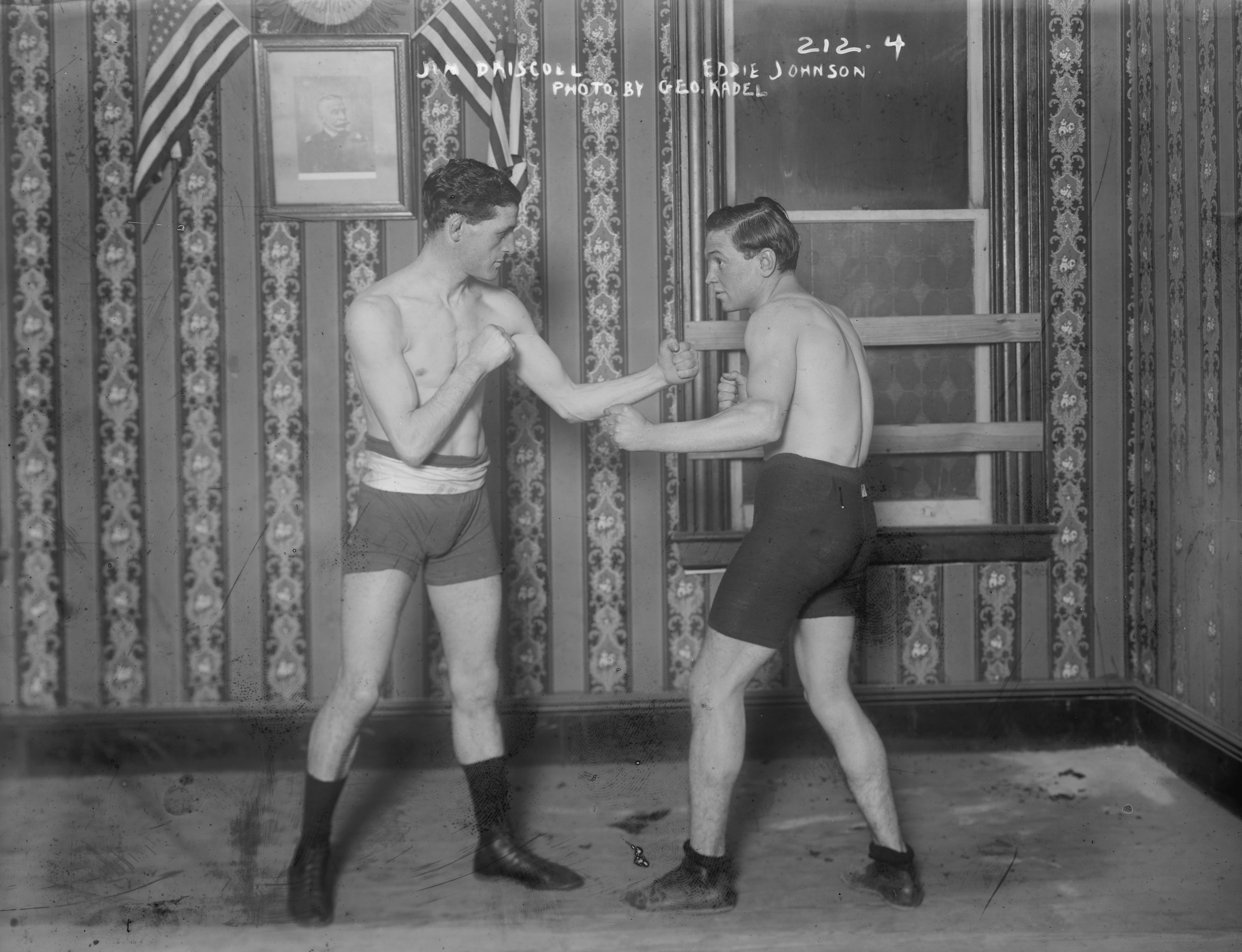
Driscoll (left) posing with fellow boxer Eddie Johnson

On 26 February 1906, Driscoll took the British Featherweight title by defeating Joe Bowker in a 15-round contest at the National Sporting Club. He undertook four more fights before his first defence, which included beating Mansfield by knockout in their fourth meet. His first title defence, held on 3 June 1907, was a copy of his title win, another contest with Bowker at the National Sporting Club in Covent Garden. This time it was a twenty-round match and Driscoll stopped his opponent in the seventeenth via a knockout.

The 24 August 1907 is recorded as a non-contest fight between Driscoll and fellow Welshman Freddie Welsh. Boxing historians such as Andrew Gallimore have cast doubt on this being a professional contest and instead a display fight at a fairground. Welsh supposedly took advantage of this situation and attacked Driscoll with kidney and rabbit punches. Driscoll never forgave his former friend for taking such liberties.

On 24 February 1908, Driscoll faced New Zealander Charlie Griffin for the vacant Commonwealth Featherweight title. Again fought at Covent Garden, the match went the full fifteen rounds with Driscoll declared champion on a points decision.

=== Boxing in the US ===
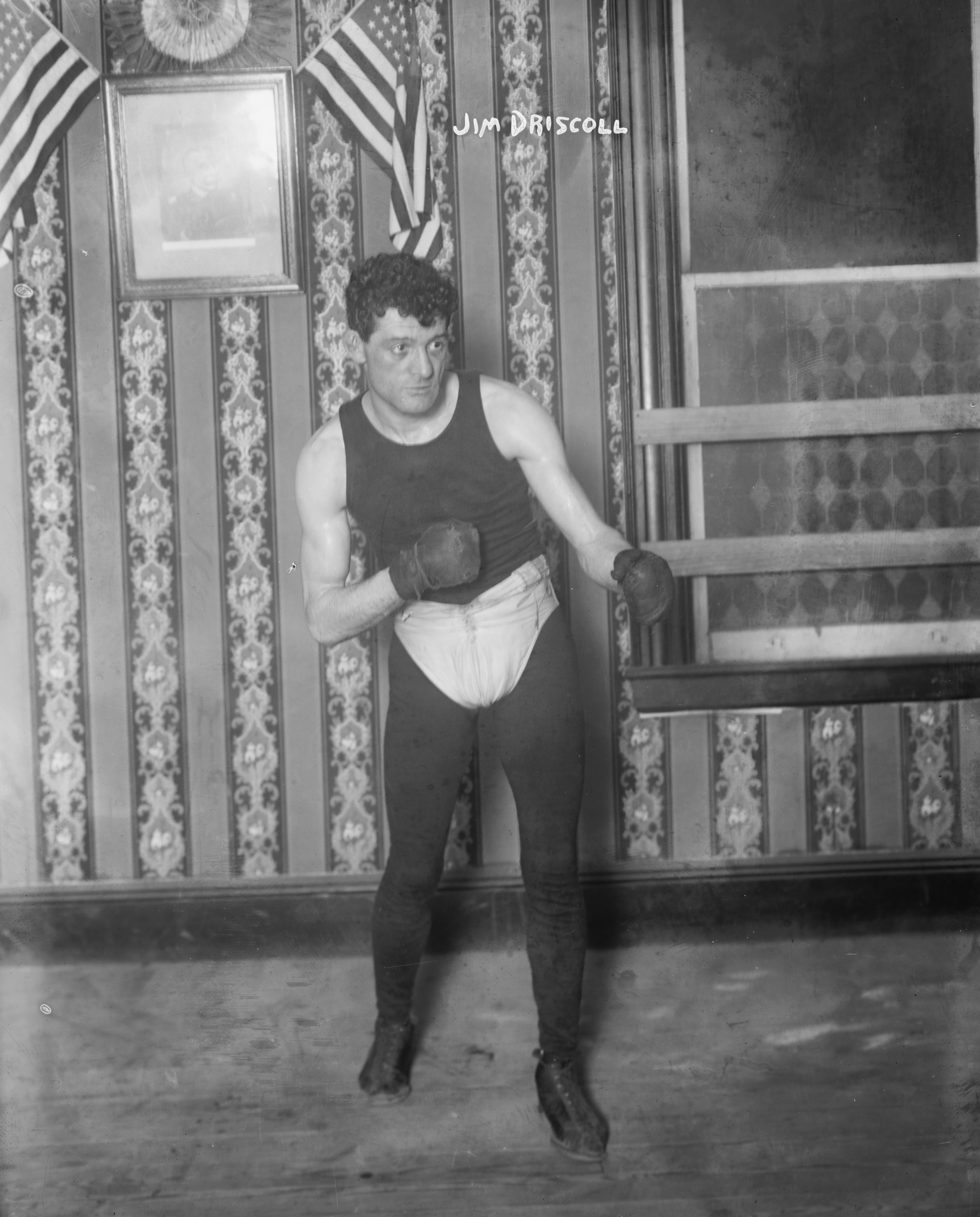
Portrait of Driscoll

After claiming the British and Commonwealth featherweight titles Driscoll went to prove himself in the U.S. American boxing fans of the era favoured all-action boxers, but they were won over by the Cardiffian's skills, giving him the nickname 'Peerless Jim.' (Another common nickname for him was "Jem," and in his home town he was affectionately called "The Prince of Wales.") Featherweight champion Abe Attell faced Driscoll in 1910; the Welshman dominated the fight, but with the "no decision" rule in place, without a KO he could not take the crown. Driscoll declined a rematch in order to attend an exhibition match in aid of the orphans of St. Nazareth House: "I never break a promise." He returned to the United States the next year, but a chest infection and an injury in a road accident sustained just days before meant a poor showing when he faced Pal Moore, losing by newspaper decision. He returned shortly after to Britain, and never got his title shot at Attell.

After becoming the first featherweight to win a Lonsdale Belt, Driscoll prepared for an eagerly-anticipated fight against Freddie Welsh. The match was a disappointment, though, as Welsh's spoiling tactics upset Driscoll's style. By the 10th round, Driscoll's frustration boiled over, and he was disqualified for butting Welsh.

=== Later years ===
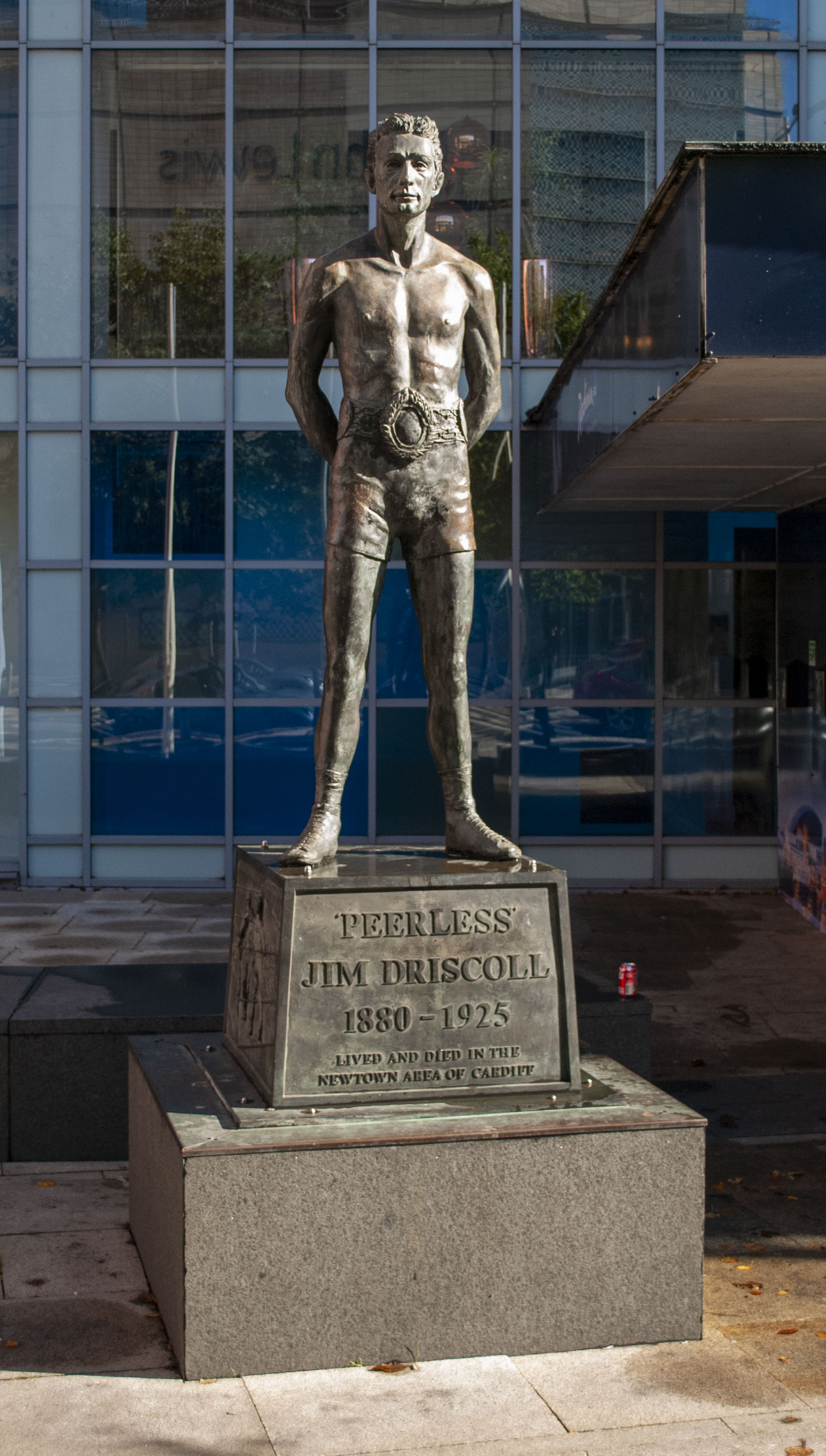
A bronze statue of Driscoll has stood in Cardiff since 1997.

Driscoll's boxing career was interrupted by World War I, where he was recruited as a physical training advisor, enlisting in 1914 in the Welsh Horse Yeomanry. In succeeding years, he continued to box despite failing health, relying on his skills to keep him out of trouble. When he died in Cardiff of consumption at the age of 44, over 100,000 people lined the streets for his funeral. He is buried at Cathays Cemetery in Cardiff, Wales. He authored a number of books on boxing; Text Book of Boxing, Outfighting, Ringcraft and most notably The Straight Left and How to Cultivate It, were widely printed and are still respected as instruction books of the sport today. In 1997 a statue was erected in his honour near the Central Boys' Club where he had trained.

=== Record ===
Driscoll's final official record is 58-3-6, with 39 KO's, however due to the scoring practices of the time, that yields 6 no-contest bouts on his record. Newspapers used to announce a winner in no-contest bouts, and taking that into account, his true record is 63-4-6 with 39 KO's.

== Professional boxing record ==
All information in this section is derived from BoxRec, unless otherwise stated.

=== Official record ===
81 fights	56 wins	4 losses
By knockout	37	1
By decision	17	2
By disqualification	2	1
Draws	7	
No contests	6	
Newspaper decisions/draws	8	

All newspaper decisions are officially regarded as “no decision” bouts and are not counted in the win/loss/draw column.

No.	Result	Record	Opponent	Type	Round	Date	Location	Notes
81	Loss	56–4–7 (14)	Charles Ledoux	RTD	16 (20)	Oct 20, 1919	National Sporting Club, Covent Garden, London, England, UK	For vacant European featherweight title
80	Draw	56–3–7 (14)	Francis Rossi	PTS	20	May 31, 1919	Pavilion, Mountain Ash, Wales, UK	
79	Win	56–3–6 (14)	Pedlar Palmer	TKO	4 (10)	Mar 10, 1919	Hoxton, England, UK	
78	Draw	55–3–6 (14)	Owen Moran	PTS	20	Jan 27, 1913	National Sporting Club, Covent Garden, London, England, UK	Retained European, Commonwealth, and NSC featherweight title
77	Win	55–3–5 (14)	Jean Poesy	KO	12 (20)	Jun 3, 1912	National Sporting Club, Covent Garden, London, England, UK	Won European featherweight title
76	ND	54–3–5 (14)	Digger Stanley	ND	3	Mar 31, 1911	Guards Theatre, Chelsea Barracks, Westminster, England, UK	
75	Win	54–3–5 (13)	Spike Robson	TKO	7 (20)	Jan 30, 1911	National Sporting Club, Covent Garden, London, England, UK	Retained NSC featherweight title
74	Loss	53–3–5 (13)	Freddie Welsh	DQ	10 (25)	Dec 20, 1910	American Skating Rink, Cardiff, Wales, UK	For European lightweight title; Driscoll DQ'd for head butts
73	Loss	53–2–5 (13)	Philadelphia Pal Moore	NWS	6	May 25, 1910	National A.C., Philadelphia, Pennsylvania, US	
72	Win	53–2–5 (12)	Spike Robson	KO	15 (20)	Apr 18, 1910	National Sporting Club, Covent Garden, London, England, UK	Retained NSC featherweight title
71	Win	52–2–5 (12)	Seaman Arthur Hayes	TKO	6 (20)	Feb 14, 1910	National Sporting Club, Covent Garden, London, England, UK	Retained Commonwealth and NSC featherweight titles
70	Win	51–2–5 (12)	Abe Attell	NWS	10	Feb 19, 1909	National A.C., New York City, New York, US	
69	Win	51–2–5 (11)	Leach Cross	NWS	10	Feb 10, 1909	Fairmont A.C., New York City, New York, US	
68	Win	51–2–5 (10)	Tommy Langdon	NWS	6	Feb 1, 1909	Washington S.C., Philadelphia, Pennsylvania, US	
67	Win	51–2–5 (9)	Johnny Marto	NWS	10	Jan 28, 1909	Fairmont A.C., New York City, New York, US	
66	Win	51–2–5 (8)	Grover Hayes	PTS	12	Jan 19, 1909	Armory A.A., Boston, Massachusetts, US	
65	Win	50–2–5 (8)	Matty Baldwin	PTS	12	Dec 29, 1908	Armory, Boston, Massachusetts, US	
64	Win	49–2–5 (8)	Grover Hayes	NWS	6	Dec 16, 1908	National A.C., Philadelphia, Pennsylvania, US	
63	Win	49–2–5 (7)	Charlie Griffin	TKO	11 (12)	Dec 8, 1908	Armory A.C., Boston, Massachusetts, US	
62	Win	48–2–5 (7)	Grover Hayes	NWS	6	Dec 5, 1908	National A.C., Philadelphia, Pennsylvania, US	
61	Win	48–2–5 (6)	Matty Baldwin	NWS	6	Nov 13, 1908	Fairmont A.C., New York City, New York, US	
60	Win	48–2–5 (5)	Charlie Griffin	DQ	15 (20)	Feb 24, 1908	National Sporting Club, Covent Garden, London, England, UK	Retained NSC British featherweight title; Won inaugural Commonwealth featherweight title
59	Win	47–2–5 (5)	Jack Roberts	KO	2 (15)	Jan 1, 1908	Aberdare, Wales, UK	
58	Win	46–2–5 (5)	Arthur Ellis	KO	3 (15)	Oct 21, 1907	Badminton Club, Cardiff, Wales, UK	
57	ND	45–2–5 (5)	Freddie Welsh	ND	6	Sep 2, 1907	Gess Pavillon, Pontypridd, Wales, UK	
56	Win	45–2–5 (4)	Joe Bowker	KO	17 (20)	Jun 3, 1907	National Sporting Club, Covent Garden, London, England, UK	Retained NSC British featherweight title
55	Win	44–2–5 (4)	Jack Roberts	PTS	7	Jul 1, 1906	Location unknown	Date not exact
54	Win	43–2–5 (4)	Joe Bowker	PTS	15	May 28, 1906	National Sporting Club, Covent Garden, London, England, UK	Retained NSC British featherweight title
53	ND	42–2–5 (4)	Johnny Summers	ND	3	Mar 6, 1906	Park Hall, Cardiff, Wales, England, UK	
52	Win	42–2–5 (3)	Jack Roberts	TKO	7 (15)	Feb 26, 1906	National Sporting Club, Covent Garden, London, England, UK	Won NSC British featherweight title
51	Win	41–2–5 (3)	George Moore	PTS	6	Feb 10, 1906	Wonderland, Whitechapel, London, England, UK	
50	ND	40–2–5 (3)	Owen Moran	ND	4	Jan 18, 1906	Barry, Wales, UK	
49	Win	40–2–5 (2)	Harry Mansfield	TKO	15 (15)	Dec 26, 1904	Harry Cullis's Boxing Pavilion, Wednesbury, England, UK	
48	Win	39–2–5 (2)	Joe Goodwin	PTS	15	Nov 13, 1904	Harry Cullis's Boxing Pavilion, Wednesbury, England, UK	
47	Win	38–2–5 (2)	Ivor Thomas	KO	3 (?)	Jun 12, 1904	Queens Hall, Cardiff, Wales, UK	
46	Draw	37–2–5 (2)	Deppy Thomas	PTS	?	May 1, 1904	Location unknown	Date not exact
45	Win	37–2–4 (2)	Harry Mansfield	PTS	10	Apr 24, 1904	Badminton Club, Cardiff, Wales, UK	
44	Win	36–2–4 (2)	Fred Delaney	PTS	10	Feb 10, 1904	Bristol, Wales, UK	
43	Loss	35–2–4 (2)	Johnnie Owens	UD	3	Feb 6, 1904	Aberdare, Wales, UK	
42	Draw	35–1–4 (2)	Deppy Thomas	PTS	15	Jan 9, 1904	Professor Moore's Sparring Pavilion, Bristol, Wales, UK	For West of England featherweight title
41	Win	35–1–3 (2)	Johnny Summers	DQ	2 (15)	Dec 12, 1904	National Sporting Club, Covent Garden, London, England, UK	Summers DQ'd for hitting Driscoll while he was down
40	Win	34–1–3 (2)	Charlie Lampey	KO	6 (15)	Nov 9, 1904	Badminton Club, Cardiff, Wales, UK	
39	Win	33–1–3 (2)	Dai Morgan	KO	3 (6)	Sep 10, 1904	Location unknown	
38	Loss	32–1–3 (2)	Harry Mansfield	PTS	10	Aug 29, 1904	Badminton Club, Cardiff, Wales, UK	
37	Win	32–0–3 (2)	Mike O'Brien	PTS	6	Aug 15, 1904	Mr T. Taylor's Boxing Saloon, Barry Dock, Wales, UK	
36	Win	31–0–3 (2)	George Moore	KO	3 (15)	Jun 27, 1904	Queen's Hall, Cardiff, Wales, UK	
35	Draw	30–0–3 (2)	Charlie Lampey	PTS	10	May 24, 1904	Queen's Hall, Cardiff, Wales, UK	
34	Win	30–0–2 (2)	Bill Stonelake	KO	11 (15)	Apr 4, 1904	Queen's Hall, Cardiff, Wales, UK	
33	Win	29–0–2 (2)	Boss Edwards	PTS	10	Feb 22, 1904	National Sporting Club, Covent Garden, London, England, UK	
32	Win	28–0–2 (2)	Dai Morgan	TKO	13 (15)	Feb 13, 1904	Queen Street Hall, Cardiff, England, UK	
31	Win	27–0–2 (2)	George Dixon	PTS	6	Feb 10, 1904	Bristol, England, UK	
30	Win	26–0–2 (2)	George Phalin	KO	5 (12)	Feb 8, 1904	Hamilton Rooms, Park Street, Bristol, England, UK	
29	Win	25–0–2 (2)	Johnnie Owens	PTS	20	Feb 1, 1904	Professor Harry Cullis's Pavilion, Barry Dock, Wales, UK	
28	ND	24–0–2 (2)	Lloyd 'Kid' Davis	ND	10	Oct 24, 1903	Ivor Athletic Club, Swansea, Wales, UK	
27	Win	24–0–2 (1)	Mike Carey	KO	4 (?)	Sep 1, 1903	Location unknown	Date not exact
26	Win	23–0–2 (1)	George Phalin	TKO	5 (?)	Aug 1, 1903	Drill Hall, Brynmawr, Wales, UK	Billed for British 112lbs title
25	Win	22–0–2 (1)	George Dixon	KO	5 (?)	Jun 1, 1903	Location unknown	Date not exact
24	Win	21–0–2 (1)	Fred Clifton	KO	2 (6)	May 18, 1903	Hamilton Rooms, Bristol, England, UK	
23	Win	20–0–2 (1)	Bill Stonelake	KO	9 (?)	Apr 1, 1903	Location unknown	Date not exact
22	Win	19–0–2 (1)	Mike Carey	KO	5 (?)	Mar 1, 1903	Location unknown	Date not exact
21	ND	18–0–2 (1)	Harry Tomlins	ND	3	Feb 2, 1903	National Sporting Club, Covent Garden, London, England, UK	
20	Win	18–0–2	George Dixon	PTS	8	Jan 24, 1903	Theatre Royal, Cadoxton, Wales, UK	
19	Win	17–0–2	George Young Cooper	PTS	10	Dec 8, 1902	E Thomas's Boxing Pavilion, Cardiff, Wales, UK	
18	Draw	16–0–2	Harry Mansfield	PTS	10	Sep 29, 1902	Grand Theatre, Cardiff, Wales, UK	
17	Win	16–0–1	Dai Stephens	TKO	3 (10)	Jul 19, 1902	Professor Cullis's Pavilion, Pontypridd, Wales, UK	
16	Draw	15–0–1	Dai Stephens	PTS	6	Jun 21, 1902	Llwynypia, Wales, UK	
15	Win	15–0	Ted Ward	KO	3 (10)	Apr 27, 1902	Pontypridd, Wales, UK	
14	Win	14–0	George Vincent	TKO	4 (4)	Apr 7, 1902	Cardiff, Wales, UK	
13	Win	13–0	Eddie Thomas	KO	5 (?)	Mar 13, 1902	Cardiff, Wales, UK	
12	Win	12–0	Larry Cronin	KO	3 (8)	Feb 17, 1902	Queen's Hall, Cardiff, Wales, UK	
11	Win	11–0	Jack Wheal	PTS	10	Jan 17, 1902	Cardiff, Wales, UK	
10	Win	10–0	Young Joe Ross	PTS	10	Dec 24, 1901	Cardiff, Wales, UK	
9	Win	9–0	Eddie Thomas	KO	3 (?)	Nov 1, 1901	Cardiff, Wales, UK	Date not exact
8	Win	8–0	Larry Cronin	KO	5 (?)	Oct 1, 1901	Location unknown	Date not exact
7	Win	7–0	Joe Morgan	KO	4 (?)	Sep 1, 1901	Location unknown	Date not exact
6	Win	6–0	Jack Brandford	KO	5 (6)	Aug 1, 1901	Wonderland, Whitechapel, London, England, UK	Date not exact
5	Win	5–0	Larry Cronin	KO	4 (?)	Jul 1, 1901	Location unknown	Date not exact
4	Win	4–0	Billy Hughes	KO	2 (?)	Jun 1, 1901	Location unknown	Date not exact
3	Win	3–0	Bill Green	KO	4 (?)	Apr 1, 1901	Location unknown	Date not exact
2	Win	2–0	Eddie Thomas	KO	5 (?)	Mar 1, 1901	Location unknown	Date not exact
1	Win	1–0	Billy Lucas	PTS	4	Feb 1, 1901	Location unknown	Date not exact; Number of rounds uncertain

=== Unofficial record ===
81 fights	63 wins	5 losses
By knockout	37	1
By decision	24	3
By disqualification	2	1
Draws	7	
No contests	6	

Record with the inclusion of newspaper decisions in the win/loss/draw column.

No.	Result	Record	Opponent	Type	Round	Date	Location	Notes
81	Loss	63–5–7 (6)	Charles Ledoux	RTD	16 (20)	Oct 20, 1919	National Sporting Club, Covent Garden, London, England, UK	For vacant European featherweight title
80	Draw	63–4–7 (6)	Francis Rossi	PTS	20	May 31, 1919	Pavilion, Mountain Ash, Wales, UK	
79	Win	63–4–6 (6)	Pedlar Palmer	TKO	4 (10)	Mar 10, 1919	Hoxton, England, UK	
78	Draw	62–4–6 (6)	Owen Moran	PTS	20	Jan 27, 1913	National Sporting Club, Covent Garden, London, England, UK	Retained European, Commonwealth, and NSC featherweight title
77	Win	62–4–5 (6)	Jean Poesy	KO	12 (20)	Jun 3, 1912	National Sporting Club, Covent Garden, London, England, UK	Won European featherweight title
76	ND	61–4–5 (6)	Digger Stanley	ND	3	Mar 31, 1911	Guards Theatre, Chelsea Barracks, Westminster, England, UK	
75	Win	61–4–5 (5)	Spike Robson	TKO	7 (20)	Jan 30, 1911	National Sporting Club, Covent Garden, London, England, UK	Retained NSC featherweight title
74	Loss	60–4–5 (5)	Freddie Welsh	DQ	10 (25)	Dec 20, 1910	American Skating Rink, Cardiff, Wales, UK	For European lightweight title; Driscoll DQ'd for head butts
73	Loss	60–3–5 (5)	Philadelphia Pal Moore	NWS	6	May 25, 1910	National A.C., Philadelphia, Pennsylvania, US	
72	Win	60–2–5 (5)	Spike Robson	KO	15 (20)	Apr 18, 1910	National Sporting Club, Covent Garden, London, England, UK	Retained NSC featherweight title
71	Win	59–2–5 (5)	Seaman Arthur Hayes	TKO	6 (20)	Feb 14, 1910	National Sporting Club, Covent Garden, London, England, UK	Retained Commonwealth and NSC featherweight titles
70	Win	58–2–5 (5)	Abe Attell	NWS	10	Feb 19, 1909	National A.C., New York City, New York, US	
69	Win	57–2–5 (5)	Leach Cross	NWS	10	Feb 10, 1909	Fairmont A.C., New York City, New York, US	
68	Win	56–2–5 (5)	Tommy Langdon	NWS	6	Feb 1, 1909	Washington S.C., Philadelphia, Pennsylvania, US	
67	Win	55–2–5 (5)	Johnny Marto	NWS	10	Jan 28, 1909	Fairmont A.C., New York City, New York, US	
66	Win	54–2–5 (5)	Grover Hayes	PTS	12	Jan 19, 1909	Armory A.A., Boston, Massachusetts, US	
65	Win	53–2–5 (5)	Matty Baldwin	PTS	12	Dec 29, 1908	Armory, Boston, Massachusetts, US	
64	Win	52–2–5 (5)	Grover Hayes	NWS	6	Dec 16, 1908	National A.C., Philadelphia, Pennsylvania, US	
63	Win	51–2–5 (5)	Charlie Griffin	TKO	11 (12)	Dec 8, 1908	Armory A.C., Boston, Massachusetts, US	
62	Win	50–2–5 (5)	Grover Hayes	NWS	6	Dec 5, 1908	National A.C., Philadelphia, Pennsylvania, US	
61	Win	49–2–5 (5)	Matty Baldwin	NWS	6	Nov 13, 1908	Fairmont A.C., New York City, New York, US	
60	Win	48–2–5 (5)	Charlie Griffin	DQ	15 (20)	Feb 24, 1908	National Sporting Club, Covent Garden, London, England, UK	Retained NSC British featherweight title; Won inaugural Commonwealth featherweight title
59	Win	47–2–5 (5)	Jack Roberts	KO	2 (15)	Jan 1, 1908	Aberdare, Wales, UK	
58	Win	46–2–5 (5)	Arthur Ellis	KO	3 (15)	Oct 21, 1907	Badminton Club, Cardiff, Wales, UK	
57	ND	45–2–5 (5)	Freddie Welsh	ND	6	Sep 2, 1907	Gess Pavillon, Pontypridd, Wales, UK	
56	Win	45–2–5 (4)	Joe Bowker	KO	17 (20)	Jun 3, 1907	National Sporting Club, Covent Garden, London, England, UK	Retained NSC British featherweight title
55	Win	44–2–5 (4)	Jack Roberts	PTS	7	Jul 1, 1906	Location unknown	Date not exact
54	Win	43–2–5 (4)	Joe Bowker	PTS	15	May 28, 1906	National Sporting Club, Covent Garden, London, England, UK	Retained NSC British featherweight title
53	ND	42–2–5 (4)	Johnny Summers	ND	3	Mar 6, 1906	Park Hall, Cardiff, Wales, England, UK	
52	Win	42–2–5 (3)	Jack Roberts	TKO	7 (15)	Feb 26, 1906	National Sporting Club, Covent Garden, London, England, UK	Won NSC British featherweight title
51	Win	41–2–5 (3)	George Moore	PTS	6	Feb 10, 1906	Wonderland, Whitechapel, London, England, UK	
50	ND	40–2–5 (3)	Owen Moran	ND	4	Jan 18, 1906	Barry, Wales, UK	
49	Win	40–2–5 (2)	Harry Mansfield	TKO	15 (15)	Dec 26, 1904	Harry Cullis's Boxing Pavilion, Wednesbury, England, UK	
48	Win	39–2–5 (2)	Joe Goodwin	PTS	15	Nov 13, 1904	Harry Cullis's Boxing Pavilion, Wednesbury, England, UK	
47	Win	38–2–5 (2)	Ivor Thomas	KO	3 (?)	Jun 12, 1904	Queens Hall, Cardiff, Wales, UK	
46	Draw	37–2–5 (2)	Deppy Thomas	PTS	?	May 1, 1904	Location unknown	Date not exact
45	Win	37–2–4 (2)	Harry Mansfield	PTS	10	Apr 24, 1904	Badminton Club, Cardiff, Wales, UK	
44	Win	36–2–4 (2)	Fred Delaney	PTS	10	Feb 10, 1904	Bristol, Wales, UK	
43	Loss	35–2–4 (2)	Johnnie Owens	UD	3	Feb 6, 1904	Aberdare, Wales, UK	
42	Draw	35–1–4 (2)	Deppy Thomas	PTS	15	Jan 9, 1904	Professor Moore's Sparring Pavilion, Bristol, Wales, UK	For West of England featherweight title
41	Win	35–1–3 (2)	Johnny Summers	DQ	2 (15)	Dec 12, 1904	National Sporting Club, Covent Garden, London, England, UK	Summers DQ'd for hitting Driscoll while he was down
40	Win	34–1–3 (2)	Charlie Lampey	KO	6 (15)	Nov 9, 1904	Badminton Club, Cardiff, Wales, UK	
39	Win	33–1–3 (2)	Dai Morgan	KO	3 (6)	Sep 10, 1904	Location unknown	
38	Loss	32–1–3 (2)	Harry Mansfield	PTS	10	Aug 29, 1904	Badminton Club, Cardiff, Wales, UK	
37	Win	32–0–3 (2)	Mike O'Brien	PTS	6	Aug 15, 1904	Mr T. Taylor's Boxing Saloon, Barry Dock, Wales, UK	
36	Win	31–0–3 (2)	George Moore	KO	3 (15)	Jun 27, 1904	Queen's Hall, Cardiff, Wales, UK	
35	Draw	30–0–3 (2)	Charlie Lampey	PTS	10	May 24, 1904	Queen's Hall, Cardiff, Wales, UK	
34	Win	30–0–2 (2)	Bill Stonelake	KO	11 (15)	Apr 4, 1904	Queen's Hall, Cardiff, Wales, UK	
33	Win	29–0–2 (2)	Boss Edwards	PTS	10	Feb 22, 1904	National Sporting Club, Covent Garden, London, England, UK	
32	Win	28–0–2 (2)	Dai Morgan	TKO	13 (15)	Feb 13, 1904	Queen Street Hall, Cardiff, England, UK	
31	Win	27–0–2 (2)	George Dixon	PTS	6	Feb 10, 1904	Bristol, England, UK	
30	Win	26–0–2 (2)	George Phalin	KO	5 (12)	Feb 8, 1904	Hamilton Rooms, Park Street, Bristol, England, UK	
29	Win	25–0–2 (2)	Johnnie Owens	PTS	20	Feb 1, 1904	Professor Harry Cullis's Pavilion, Barry Dock, Wales, UK	
28	ND	24–0–2 (2)	Lloyd 'Kid' Davis	ND	10	Oct 24, 1903	Ivor Athletic Club, Swansea, Wales, UK	
27	Win	24–0–2 (1)	Mike Carey	KO	4 (?)	Sep 1, 1903	Location unknown	Date not exact
26	Win	23–0–2 (1)	George Phalin	TKO	5 (?)	Aug 1, 1903	Drill Hall, Brynmawr, Wales, UK	Billed for British 112lbs title
25	Win	22–0–2 (1)	George Dixon	KO	5 (?)	Jun 1, 1903	Location unknown	Date not exact
24	Win	21–0–2 (1)	Fred Clifton	KO	2 (6)	May 18, 1903	Hamilton Rooms, Bristol, England, UK	
23	Win	20–0–2 (1)	Bill Stonelake	KO	9 (?)	Apr 1, 1903	Location unknown	Date not exact
22	Win	19–0–2 (1)	Mike Carey	KO	5 (?)	Mar 1, 1903	Location unknown	Date not exact
21	ND	18–0–2 (1)	Harry Tomlins	ND	3	Feb 2, 1903	National Sporting Club, Covent Garden, London, England, UK	
20	Win	18–0–2	George Dixon	PTS	8	Jan 24, 1903	Theatre Royal, Cadoxton, Wales, UK	
19	Win	17–0–2	George Young Cooper	PTS	10	Dec 8, 1902	E Thomas's Boxing Pavilion, Cardiff, Wales, UK	
18	Draw	16–0–2	Harry Mansfield	PTS	10	Sep 29, 1902	Grand Theatre, Cardiff, Wales, UK	
17	Win	16–0–1	Dai Stephens	TKO	3 (10)	Jul 19, 1902	Professor Cullis's Pavilion, Pontypridd, Wales, UK	
16	Draw	15–0–1	Dai Stephens	PTS	6	Jun 21, 1902	Llwynypia, Wales, UK	
15	Win	15–0	Ted Ward	KO	3 (10)	Apr 27, 1902	Pontypridd, Wales, UK	
14	Win	14–0	George Vincent	TKO	4 (4)	Apr 7, 1902	Cardiff, Wales, UK	
13	Win	13–0	Eddie Thomas	KO	5 (?)	Mar 13, 1902	Cardiff, Wales, UK	
12	Win	12–0	Larry Cronin	KO	3 (8)	Feb 17, 1902	Queen's Hall, Cardiff, Wales, UK	
11	Win	11–0	Jack Wheal	PTS	10	Jan 17, 1902	Cardiff, Wales, UK	
10	Win	10–0	Young Joe Ross	PTS	10	Dec 24, 1901	Cardiff, Wales, UK	
9	Win	9–0	Eddie Thomas	KO	3 (?)	Nov 1, 1901	Cardiff, Wales, UK	Date not exact
8	Win	8–0	Larry Cronin	KO	5 (?)	Oct 1, 1901	Location unknown	Date not exact
7	Win	7–0	Joe Morgan	KO	4 (?)	Sep 1, 1901	Location unknown	Date not exact
6	Win	6–0	Jack Brandford	KO	5 (6)	Aug 1, 1901	Wonderland, Whitechapel, London, England, UK	Date not exact
5	Win	5–0	Larry Cronin	KO	4 (?)	Jul 1, 1901	Location unknown	Date not exact
4	Win	4–0	Billy Hughes	KO	2 (?)	Jun 1, 1901	Location unknown	Date not exact
3	Win	3–0	Bill Green	KO	4 (?)	Apr 1, 1901	Location unknown	Date not exact
2	Win	2–0	Eddie Thomas	KO	5 (?)	Mar 1, 1901	Location unknown	Date not exact
1	Win	1–0	Billy Lucas	PTS	4	Feb 1, 1901	Location unknown	Date not exact; Number of rounds uncertain

== Legacy ==
Driscoll bequeathed his Lonsdale Belt to his cousin, Tom Burns, who ran the Royal Oak Hotel in Adamsdown, Cardiff. Today the pub is decorated with Jim Driscoll and other boxing memorabilia.

In January 2016 an hour long documentary about him, "Jim Driscoll: Meistr y Sgwâr" (Jim Driscoll: Master of the Ring), was broadcast on the S4C television channel.

== See also ==
- List of British featherweight boxing champions

== Bibliography ==
- Cordell, Alexander (1984, 2014). Peerless Jim. London. Hodder & Stoughton. ISBN 978-1-4736-0390-5
- Hignall, Andrew; Prescott, Gwyn (2007). Cardiff: Sporting Greats. Stroud: Stadia. ISBN 978-0-7524-4286-0.
- Jones, Gareth (2009). The Boxers of Wales: Cardiff. Cardiff: St David's Press. ISBN 978-1-902719-26-9.
- Stead, Peter; Williams, Gareth, eds. (2008). Wales and its Boxers, The Fighting Tradition. Cardiff: University of Wales Press. ISBN 978-0-7083-1915-4.
