= Mike Doyle (comedian) =

British comedian, vocalist and broadcaster

Mike Doyle is a Welsh comedian, vocalist and broadcaster from Carmarthen, Wales, now based in nearby Bridgend.

== Career ==
=== Opportunity Knocks ===
Mike made his debut television back in 1988, winning the BBC One talent show Opportunity Knocks.

=== Standup Comedy ===
Mike has done many pantomimes and standup comedy shows including his very own televised series "The Mike Doyle Show" which aired on HTV (ITV Wales) in 2002. Mike has worked for BBC Radio Wales, 106.3 Bridge FM, 102.1 Swansea Bay Radio, Radio Carmarthenshire and Radio Pembrokeshire.

=== Royal Variety ===
Mike appeared at the 1991 Royal Variety Performance.

=== The Lyrics Game ===
Mike has also presented a televised gameshow called The Lyrics Game for the BBC back in 2004.

=== Trade Centre Group ===
Trevor, a character used in the advertisements of Trade Centre Group, is voiced by Mike.

=== West End ===
Mike has appeared in West End shows including playing The Big Bopper in Buddy and playing Vince Fontaine in Grease. He released an album, Every Word, in 1999.

=== Music ===
In 2010, Mike released a single entitled What Colour is the Wind? to help raise money for Cardiff Institute for the Blind.
