= Daniel Driscoll =

Daniel Driscoll may refer to:

- Daniel Driscoll (1885–1928), Welshman executed for murder
- Daniel A. Driscoll (1875–1955), Representatives from New York
- Daniel Joseph Driscoll (1876–1942), Canadian city councillor
- Daniel P. Driscoll (born 1986), U.S. Secretary of the Army
- Daniel Patrick Driscoll (1862–1934), British army officer
- Danny Driscoll (1855–1888), American criminal of the Whyos Gang
