= Royal Oak, Cardiff =

Pub in Cardiff, Wales

Coordinates: 51.4903°N 3.1492°W

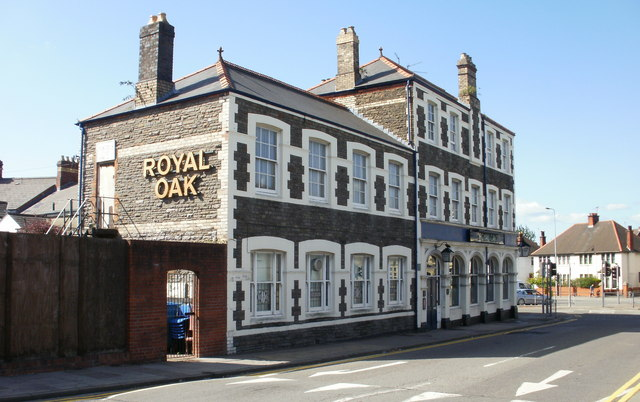
The Royal Oak, seen from Beresford Road

The Royal Oak is a Grade II listed public house on Newport Road in the Adamsdown/Roath area of Cardiff, Wales.

== History ==
The pub dates from the late 19th century. In the early part of the 20th century it was run by a cousin of the boxer, Jim Driscoll, who on his death bequeathed his Lonsdale Belt to the pub. The pub developed a boxing theme, with memorabilia on the walls and, unusually, a professional boxing gym above the function room.

In the 1980s the Royal Oak had a vibrant rock and punk music scene.

It was given listed status in 2006 as a "well-preserved late C19 purpose-built public house particularly rare in preserving much of its original planning in the bar areas".

The pub was known for serving its Brains SA beer by gravity from barrels behind the bar, though in the 21st century it is pumped from the cellar, still 'flat' without a creamy head.

In 2010 the Royal Oak was the only Cardiff pub to make it onto list of the Top 100 Famous UK pubs, compiled by whisky maker Famous Grouse.

== See also ==
- Pub names#Royal Oak
