= HM Prison Cardiff =

Prison in Cardiff, Wales

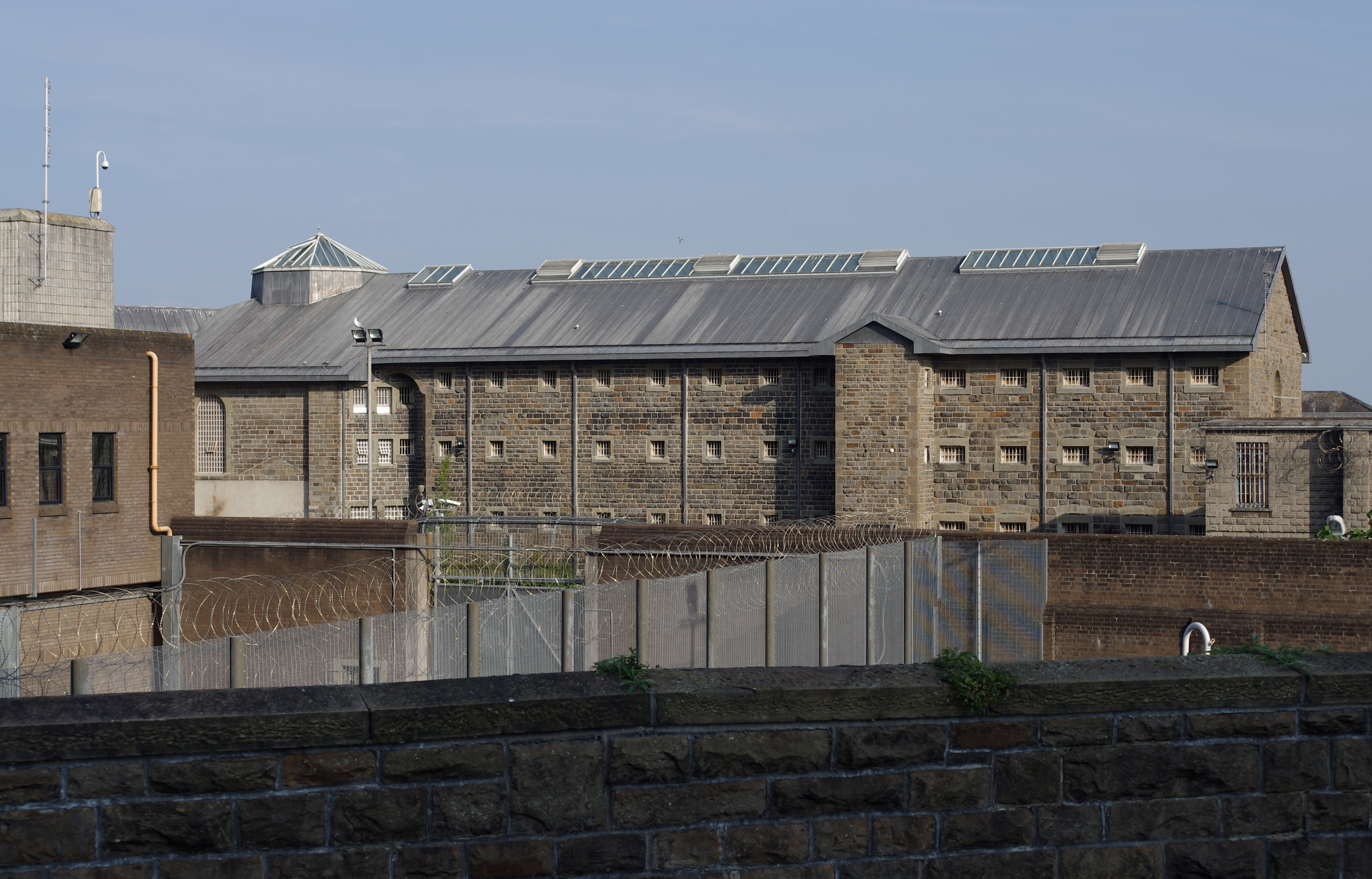
- Interactive map of HM Prison Cardiff
- Location: Adamsdown, Cardiff; 51°28′52″N 3°10′06″W
- Security class: Adult Male/Category B
- Capacity: 534 (baseline certified normal capacity)
- Population: 737 (January 2024)
- Opened: 1832
- Managed by: HM Prison Service
- Governor: Andrew Phillips (interim)
- Website: Cardiff at justice.gov.uk

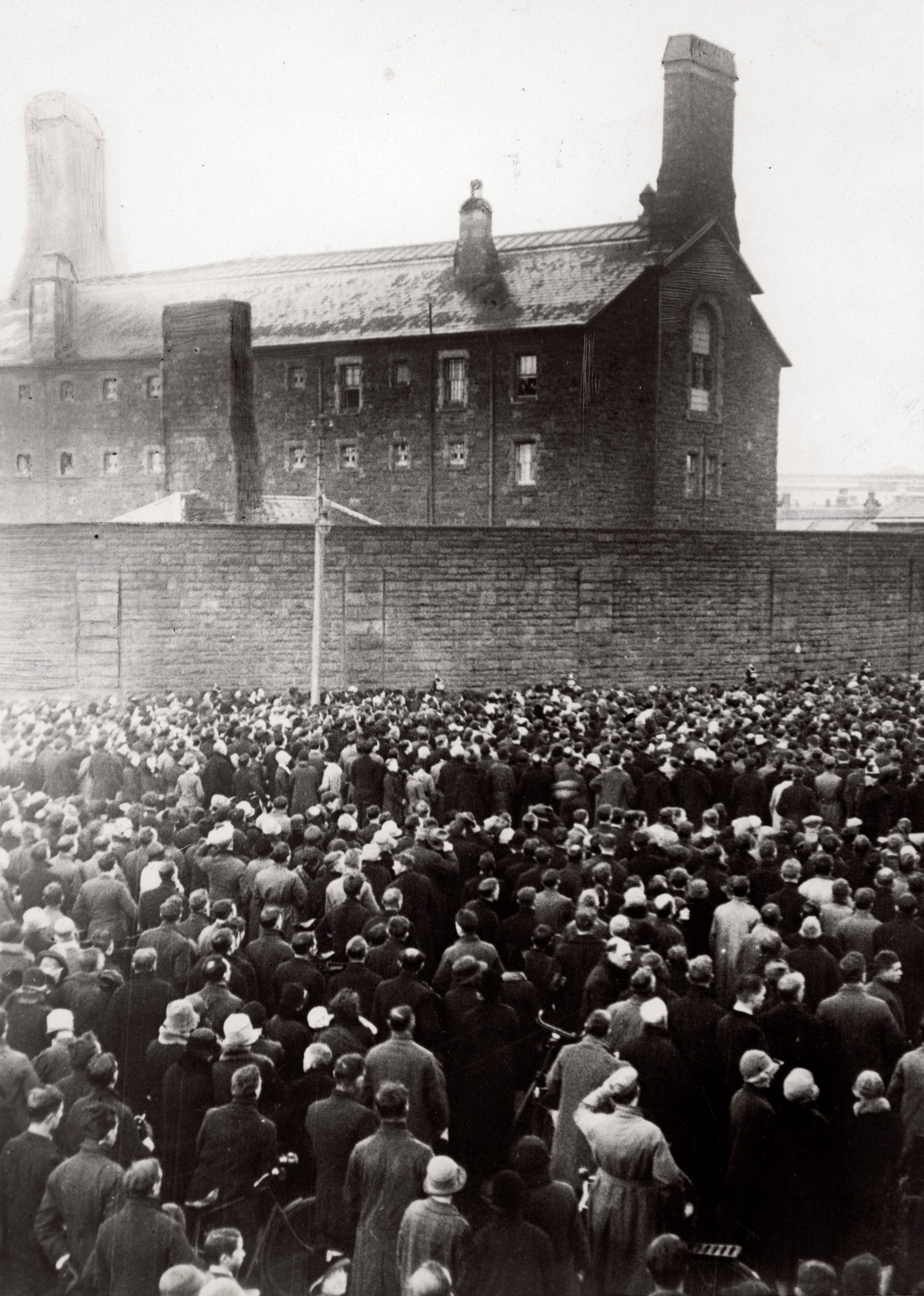
Onlookers during the execution of Rowlands and Driscoll in 1928

HM Prison Cardiff (Welsh: Carchar Caerdydd EF) is a Category B men's prison, located in the Adamsdown area of Cardiff, Wales. The prison is operated by His Majesty's Prison Service.

== History ==
By 1814, the existing Cardiff Gaol was deemed insufficient for coping with both the scale of demand and quality of building to cope with the quickly expanding industrial town, and so proposals were made to build a new county jail for Glamorgan. Construction commenced in 1827, and the new stone building located south of Crockherbtown opened at the end of 1832, capable of housing 80 prisoners, including 20 debtors.

The three Victorian wings of Cardiff Prison underwent a major refurbishment programme in 1996, and the prison's capacity was extended by the commissioning of three new wings (C, D and E), with the number of places for life-sentenced prisoners increased also.

In 1997 Cardiff Prison was criticised for chaining sick inmates to their hospital beds after a probe into the death of one of Cardiff's prisoners. Three years later one of Cardiff's Assistant Governors was found dead after an investigation into child pornography. The manager had been arrested at the prison days earlier by detectives investigating the alleged misuse of a personal computer.

Cardiff Prison was criticised in 2001 for its cell-share policy in the wake of an inmate's death. Prison officials were advised to carry out full checks on prisoners on their arrival, to prevent violent or even fatal incidents from occurring. A year later the prison was criticised again for its poor record in dealing with drug abuse and providing decent recreation facilities for inmates.

=== Execution site ===
A total of 20 judicial executions took place at Cardiff prison. The condemned prisoners were hanged for the crime of murder. Their names, ages and dates of execution are:

- William Augustus Lacey, 29 yrs, 21 August 1900
- Eric Lange, 30 yrs, 21 December 1904
- Rhoda Wills, 44 yrs, 14 August 1907 (female)
- George Stills, 30 yrs, 13 December 1907
- Noah Percy Collins, 21 yrs, 30 December 1908
- Hugh McLaren, 29 yrs, 14 August 1913
- Edgar Lewis George Bindon, 19 yrs, 25 March 1914
- Alexander Bakerlis, 24 yrs, 10 April 1917
- Thomas Caler, 23 yrs, 14 April 1920
- Lester Augustus Hamilton, 25 yrs, 16 August 1921
- George Thomas, 26 yrs, 9 March 1926
- Edward Rowlands, 40 yrs, 27 January 1928
- Daniel Driscoll, 34 yrs, 27 January 1928
- William John Corbett, 32 yrs, 12 August 1931
- George Edward Roberts, 29 yrs, 8 August 1940
- Howard Joseph Grossley, 37 yrs, 5 September 1945 (an AWOL Canadian soldier)
- Evan Haydn Evans, 22 yrs, 3 February 1948
- Clifford Godfrey Wills, 31 yrs, 9 December 1948
- Ajit Singh, 27 yrs, 7 May 1952
- Mahmood Mattan, 28 yrs, 3 September 1952 (conviction quashed in February 1998)

The remains of executed prisoners were buried in unmarked graves within the prison walls, as was customary. In late 2003, after capital punishment had been abolished in the UK, the remains of Corbett, Roberts, Grossley, Evans, Wills and Singh were exhumed from the prison grounds and reburied elsewhere in order to make space for the construction of a new cell block. The precise location of the new cell block is 51°28′47.58″N 3°10′04.68″W.

The remains of Mahmood Mattan (executed in 1952 but cleared of murder in 1998) had previously been exhumed from the same location for reburial in 1996. Mattan is now buried in the Muslim section of Western Cemetery, Cardiff. His tombstone bears the epitaph "Killed by Injustice". After Mattan's conviction was quashed, his widow Laura and three sons (David, Omar and Mervyn) received the sum of £725,000 in compensation from the British Government.

== The prison today ==
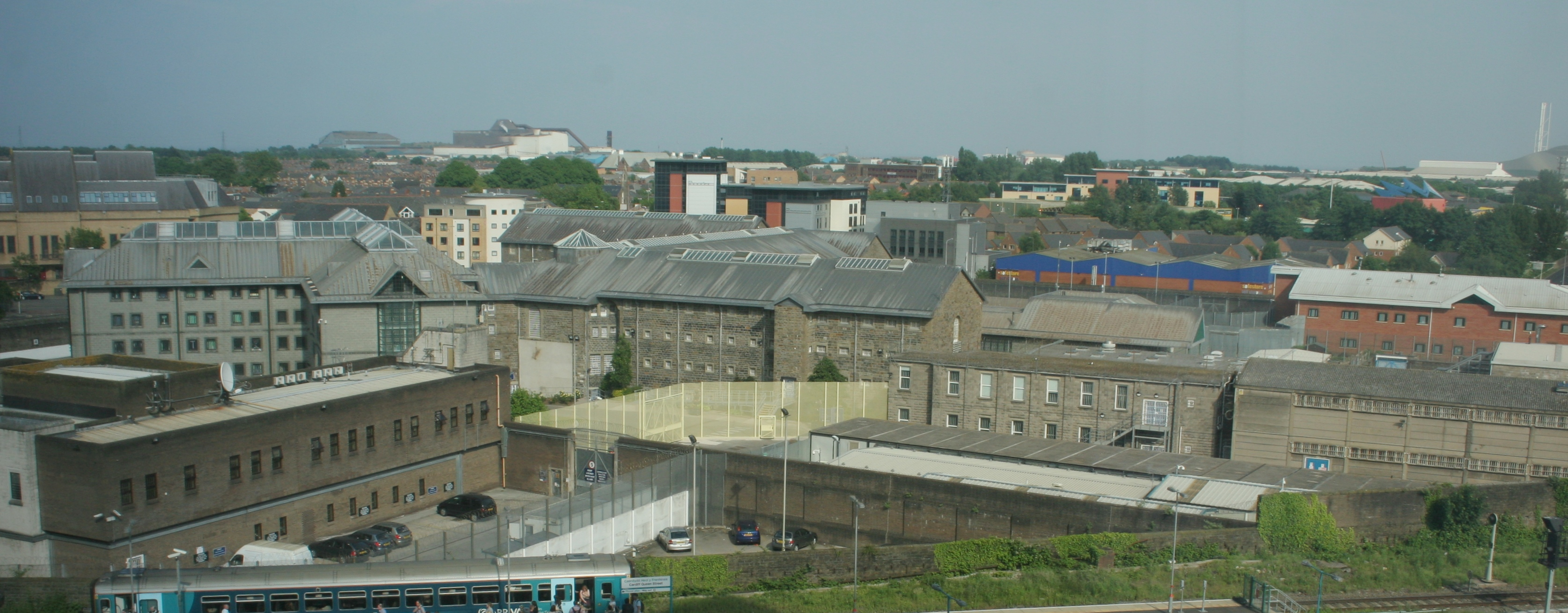
View of the prison from Queen Street railway station

Cardiff Prison accepts male adult prisoners remanded into custody who are drawn predominantly from the surrounding court catchment area of South Wales. In addition Cardiff also houses sentenced Category B and C prisoners.

Cardiff's regime includes full-time education, and training courses. There is a resettlement unit that offers prisoners various offending behaviour programmes and work based courses, and a Detoxification Unit accommodating 50 prisoners.

In 1999 the actor Keith Allen played a Probation and Parole officer at the prison, in the BBC television series Jack of Hearts.

A report conducted by HM Inspectorate of Prisons in January 2024 found significant overcrowding, with two-thirds of prisoners sharing cells designed for one. 10 prisoners had taken their own lives since the previous inspection in 2019. 24% of prisoners reported that they felt unsafe, however rates of violence were reportedly lower than comparable prisons. 193 assaults on prisoners and 14 serious assaults between prisoners were recorded in the 12 months before the inspection. 40% of prisoners reported that illegal drugs were easy to obtain, and just under a quarter of prisoners tested positive for illegal drugs in random mandatory testing.

== Notable former inmates ==
- John Straffen
