= Cathays Cemetery =

Cemetery in Cardiff, Wales

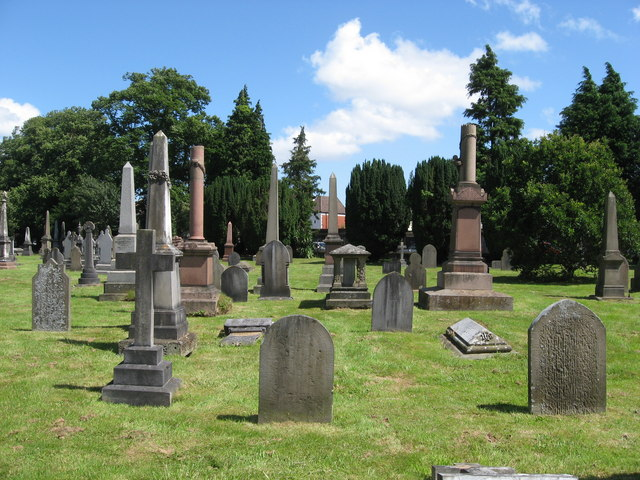
- Cathays Cemetery
- Interactive map of Cathays Cemetery

Details
- Established: 1859
- Location: Cathays, Cardiff
- Country: Wales
- Coordinates: 51.5017°N 3.1808°W
- Owned by: Cardiff Council
- Website: Cathays Cemetery
- Find a Grave: Cathays Cemetery

Cathays Cemetery is one of the main cemeteries of Cardiff, Wales. It is located in the Cathays district of the city, about 1.5 miles (2.4 km) north of Cardiff city centre. At 110 acres, it is the third‑largest cemetery in the United Kingdom. It is listed on the Cadw/ICOMOS Register of Parks and Gardens of Special Historic Interest in Wales.

== History ==
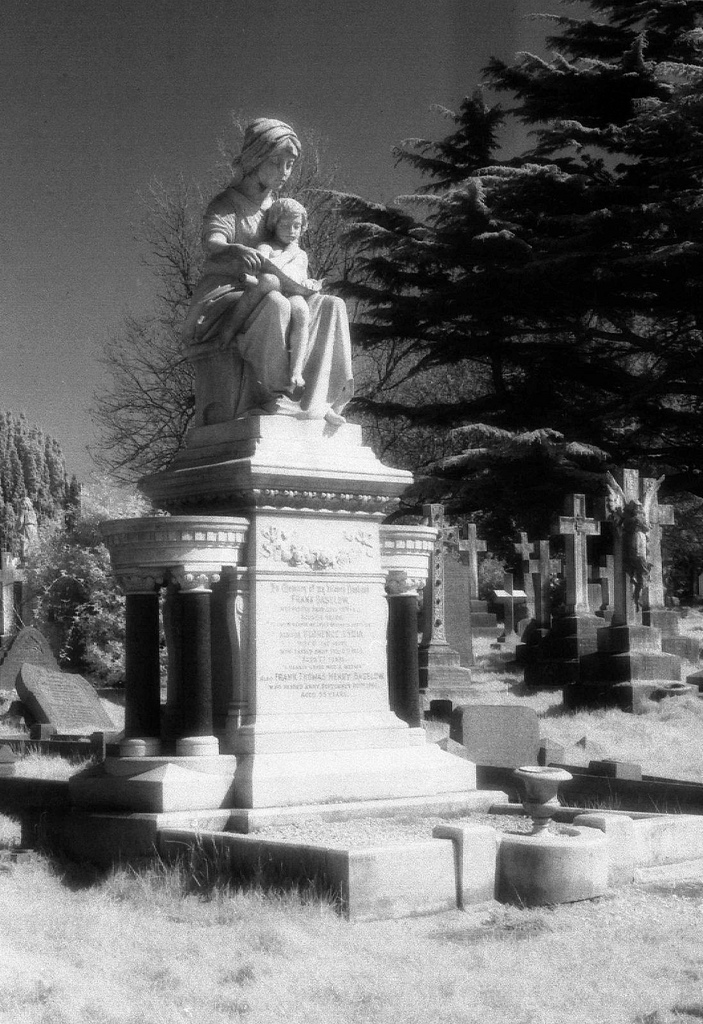
Monument to Frank Baselow

The cemetery was opened in 1859 and originally had two chapels: one Anglican and the other non‑conformist, each with its own porte-cochère. The cemetery also has a Roman Catholic section, where a Roman Catholic chapel was built later.

During the Second World War, air raids damaged Cathays Cemetery, with a number of bombs and an aerial mine hitting the grounds. In the early to mid‑1970s, the cemetery was split into two sections to allow the construction of the A48 Eastern Avenue, which was a continuation of the A48(M). In the 20th century, all three chapels fell into neglect, and in the 1980s the Roman Catholic chapel was demolished. Since 2008, the Anglican and non‑conformist chapels have been undergoing restoration. One of the most imposing memorials is that of Frank Baselow, thought to be a result of Baselow's European heritage (his actual name was Franz) and the Continental taste for grand memorials.

The two chapels, the cemetery house, and the gateway and forecourt walls are Grade II listed buildings. The cemetery itself is listed at Grade II on the Cadw/ICOMOS Register of Parks and Gardens of Special Historic Interest in Wales.

=== War graves ===
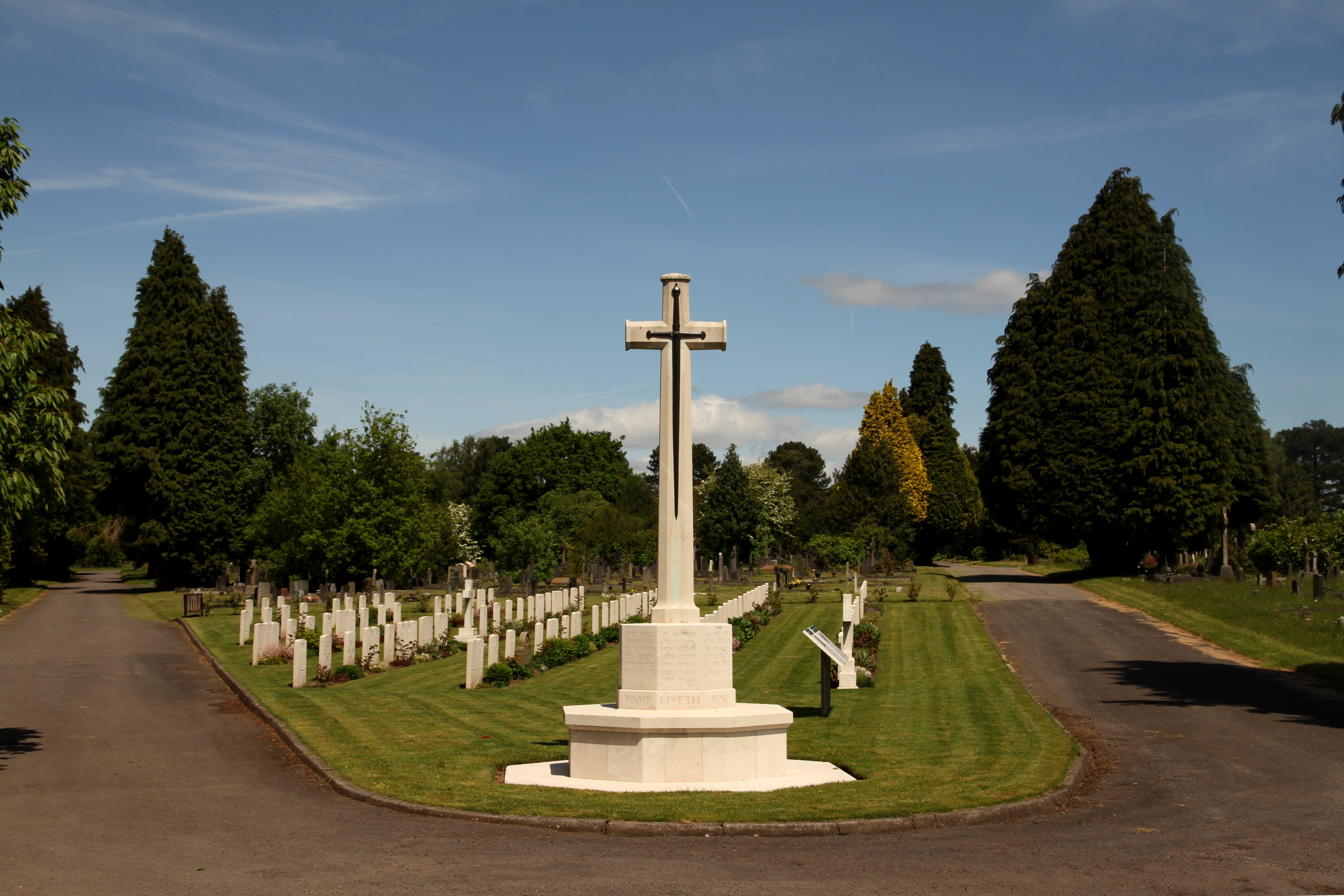
Commonwealth War Graves section

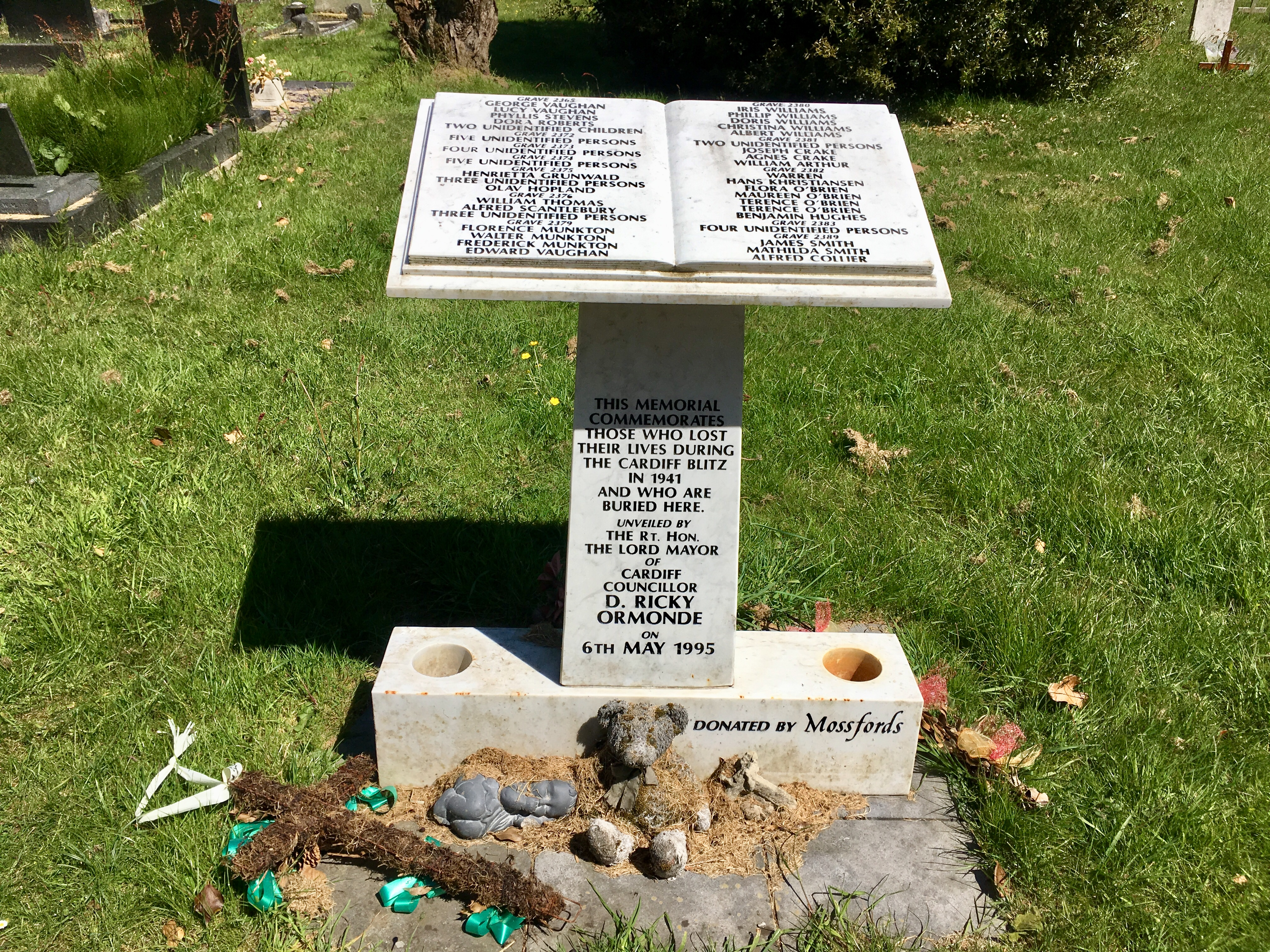
Memorial to the victims of the Cardiff Blitz in Cathays Cemetery

The cemetery has a Commonwealth War Graves (CWGC) section, marked by a Cross of Sacrifice made to the standard design devised by Reginald Blomfield. The section was established during the First World War, when Cardiff's nearby main hospitals treated numerous servicemen who had been wounded in action or who contracted influenza in the 1918–19 influenza pandemic.

The war graves section includes a number of graves of Australian and Canadian servicemen, one New Zealander who died while serving in the Royal Defence Corps, and one soldier of the Prince of Wales's Leinster Regiment. Also present is the grave of Jacques Vaillant de Guélis, a Special Operations Executive agent. The cemetery includes the graves of 21 French Navy sailors from the First World War, mostly in the Roman Catholic section, and a similar number of Norwegian sailors from the Second. Elsewhere in the cemetery are numerous Commonwealth War Graves from both the First and Second World Wars. The cemetery contains the graves of 685 service personnel registered and maintained by the CWGC. Victims of the Cardiff Blitz who are buried in the cemetery are commemorated by a memorial erected in 1993.

== Notable interments ==
- Robert Bird, Liberal Party politician
- Sir James Cory, 1st Baronet, shipowner and Conservative Party politician
- Jim Driscoll, boxer
- John Emlyn-Jones, shipowner and Liberal politician
- John Humphrey England, founder of Edward England Potatoes
- Louisa Maud Evans, a young girl who died in a ballooning accident in 1896
- John Cuthbert Hedley, Roman Catholic bishop
- Archibald Hood, colliery owner
- Thomas Rowland Hughes, writer
- David (Dai) Lewis, professional boxer murdered by Driscoll and Rowlands in 1927 (contested)
- Hilary Marquand, Labour Party politician
- Sir William Henry Seager, shipowner and Liberal politician
- Frances Batty Shand, founder of the Cardiff Institute for the Blind
- Sir William Reardon Smith, 1st Baronet, shipowner
- William Tatem, 1st Baron Glanely, shipowner
- Sir Tudor Thomas, ophthalmic surgeon
- Alfred Thomas, 1st Baron Pontypridd, Liberal politician
- Maurice Turnbull, Glamorgan and England cricketer
- Ernest Willows, aviation pioneer and airship builder
- Several victims of the Senghenydd Colliery Disaster

== Sources and further reading ==
- Cathays Cemetery Cardiff on its 150th Anniversary. Cardiff: Friends of Cathays Cemetery. 2009.
- "Cathays Cemetery Heritage Trail". Cardiff Council. 2006. Archived from the original (pdf) on 26 September 2007.
