= Robert Bird (Welsh politician) =

Liberal politician and owner of a Tar Distillery (1839–1909)

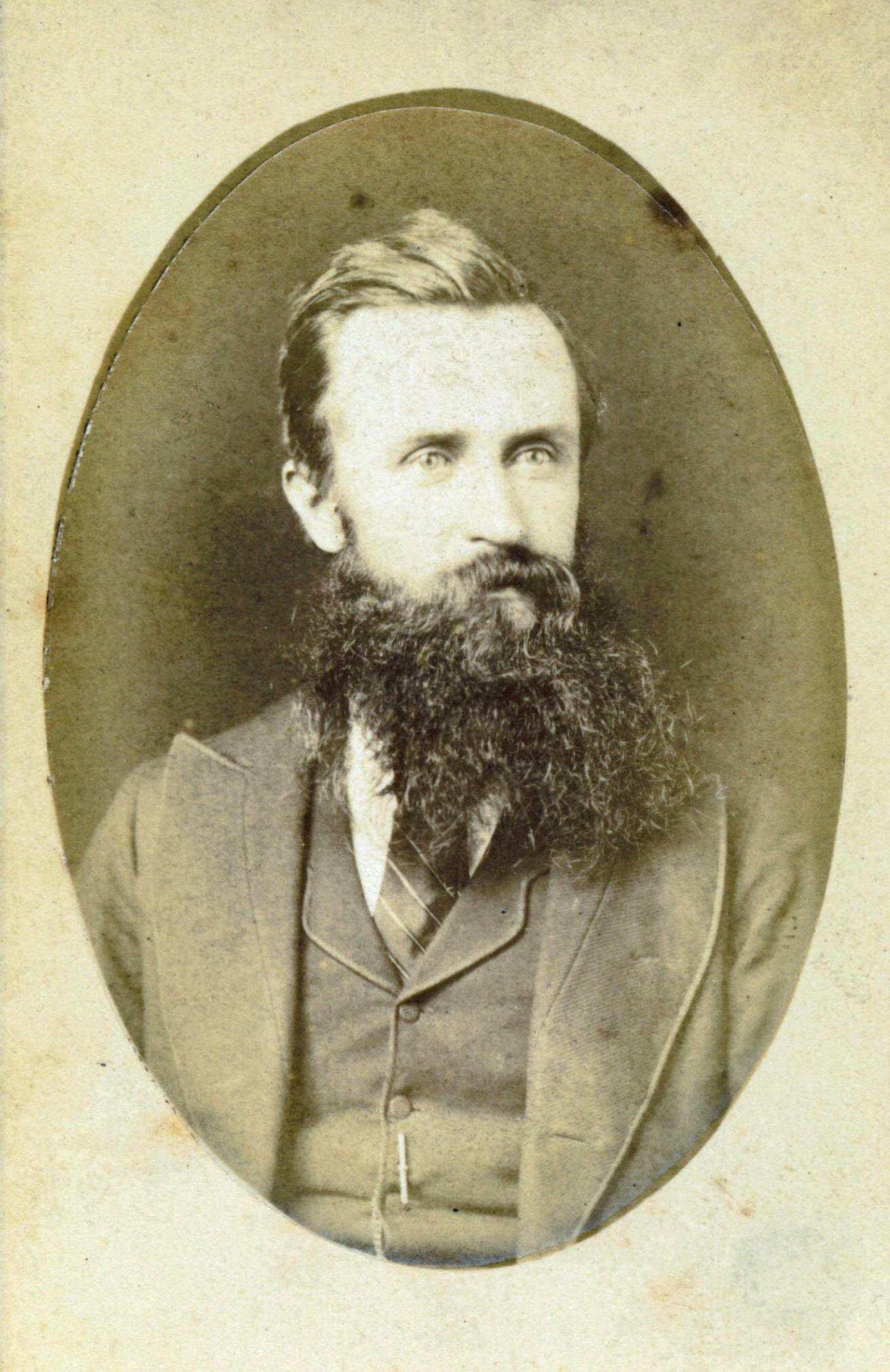
Robert Bird, mayor of Cardiff (1883–1884).

Robert Bird (13 February 1839 – 3 January 1909) was a Liberal politician and owner of a Tar Distillery, Robert Bird & Sons, in East Moors, Cardiff, Wales.

== Biography ==
Bird was born in Soundwell, near Bristol, but moved to Cardiff in 1872. He was a Welsh Liberal politician. He served as mayor of Cardiff in 1882. Appointed an Alderman he later served as President of the Cardiff Liberal Association. A loyal Liberal, he opposed the revolt of David Lloyd George, Frank Edwards, Herbert Lewis and David Alfred Thomas over Welsh Disestablishment in 1894.

In 1896, Robert Bird achieved notoriety among Welsh nationalists. On 16 January, the proposal to merge the South Wales Liberal Federation with the Welsh National Federation was put to the Annual General Meeting of the South Wales Liberal Federation, held at Newport, Monmouthshire. Speaking against the motion, Robert Bird declared: "You will find, from Swansea to Newport, a cosmopolitan population who will not submit to the domination of Welsh ideas!" causing outrage among the supporters of Cymru Fydd. In spite of the inflammatory nature of his comments, Bird seems to have been directing his ire more at the removal of a separate South Wales Liberal organisation, as he was later found among the supporters of a single Welsh Liberal organisation which recognised the economic and social differences between North and South Wales.

Further political controversy engulfed Bird when he was chosen as Liberal candidate for Cardiff, due to his opposition to the Boer War. He was eventually dropped and Sir E. J. Reed, the former MP was chosen instead.

Bird was described as: 'a Nonconformist both by birth and conviction.' A prominent member of the United Methodist Free Church and President of the Cardiff Free Church Council for 1901, Alderman Bird was a generous benefactor to the cause of Nonconformity. Trinity Methodist Church at Newport Road, where he was a member, and where his wife laid the foundation stone of the halls attached, benefited greatly from the family of Robert Bird. He also built the Church on Penarth Road and leased it to the Free Methodists. Robert Bird was the first superintendent of Penarth Road's Sunday School (and owned the building). Alderman Bird served on the Committee which secured the National Museum of Wales for Cardiff.

Robert Bird was instrumental in facilitating the negotiations which led to the formation of the United Methodist Church in 1907, bringing together the Bible Christians, United Methodist Free Churches and Methodist New Connexion, after the failure of efforts to bring together all the Methodist denominations failed.

Bird's ashes were buried in a family tomb in Cathays Cemetery, Cardiff.
