= Frances Batty Shand =

Frances Batty Shand (c.1815–1885) was an early charitable activist in Cardiff, Wales.

Shand was born in about 1815 in Jamaica, the daughter of John Shand, a Scottish plantation owner, and an enslaved woman named Frances Brown. She was sent to live in Elgin, Scotland in 1819, probably to live with an aunt. She remained unmarried.

In the mid 1800s Shand came to Cardiff, where her brother John Batty Shand (c.1804-1877) worked for the Rhymney Railway Company. With the help of money inherited from her father, Shand founded the Association for Improving the Social and Working Conditions of the Blind (which became Cardiff Institute for the Blind) in April 1865. The Association initially helped five blind men set up basket-making workshops.

Shand retired in 1877. She died in Switzerland in 1885, though her body was returned to Cardiff for burial at Allensbank Cemetery. She bequeathed money to the Institute to allow it to continue with financial security. In 1953 it moved to a new purpose built four storey building on Newport Road, Cardiff, which was named Shand House in her honour in 1984.

Shand was the subject of an ITV television programme in 2013.
