= Driscoll and Rowlands =

Welsh men convicted of murder

Daniel (Dan) Driscoll (1885–1928) and Edward (Tich) Rowlands (1877–1928) were two Welsh men convicted of the 1927 murder of David Lewis, a boxing champion. Both were hanged, but most evidence, then and now, suggests both were innocent.

== Background ==
The Rowland brothers (Edward and John, aka Tich and Jack) ran an established protection racket in Cardiff, when David (Dai) Lewis, a former professional boxer and rugby player decided to muscle in, and started a rival business, operating as a one-man-operation. He had undermined their existing business with bookies at the Monmouth racetrack. Whilst this is true, it was also said that the Rowlands had used Lewis as a go-between following a mail robbery they undertook and Lewis had cheated them out of around £4500, claiming to have been robbed. However this is merely rumour and was never substantiated in any way. The truth is most likely to be that the gang didn’t like the fact that Dai Lewis was going alone. Either way, the Rowlands sought to punish Lewis.

Lewis, born in 1896, lived with his wife Amy and children at Ethel Street in Cardiff and his father lived with them.

Danny Driscoll came from a very large family and was the eldest of 12 brothers. He had served as a gunner in the First World War.

== The crime ==
On 29 September 1927 a street fight began, just after 11pm, outside the Blue Anchor pub at 63 St Mary Street in Cardiff city centre.

It was probably intended to be a heavy beating but Lewis ended with a slash to the throat. He was taken to Cardiff Royal Infirmary and police brought both of the Rowlands brothers and three of their cronies for Lewis to identify: Daniel Driscoll, John Hughes and William (Hong Kong) Price. However, Lewis abiding by the long-running convention of the underworld, and refused to identify his attackers.

The news was broken to Lewis's family not by police but by Sydney Graves, a young newspaper reporter at 12.15am. His wife went to be with Dai and he died with her there the following day.

Driscoll was the person who called the hospital three times to establish Lewis's condition. The third call was traced to the Colonial Club in Cardiff and staff identified Driscoll as the caller.

== The trial ==
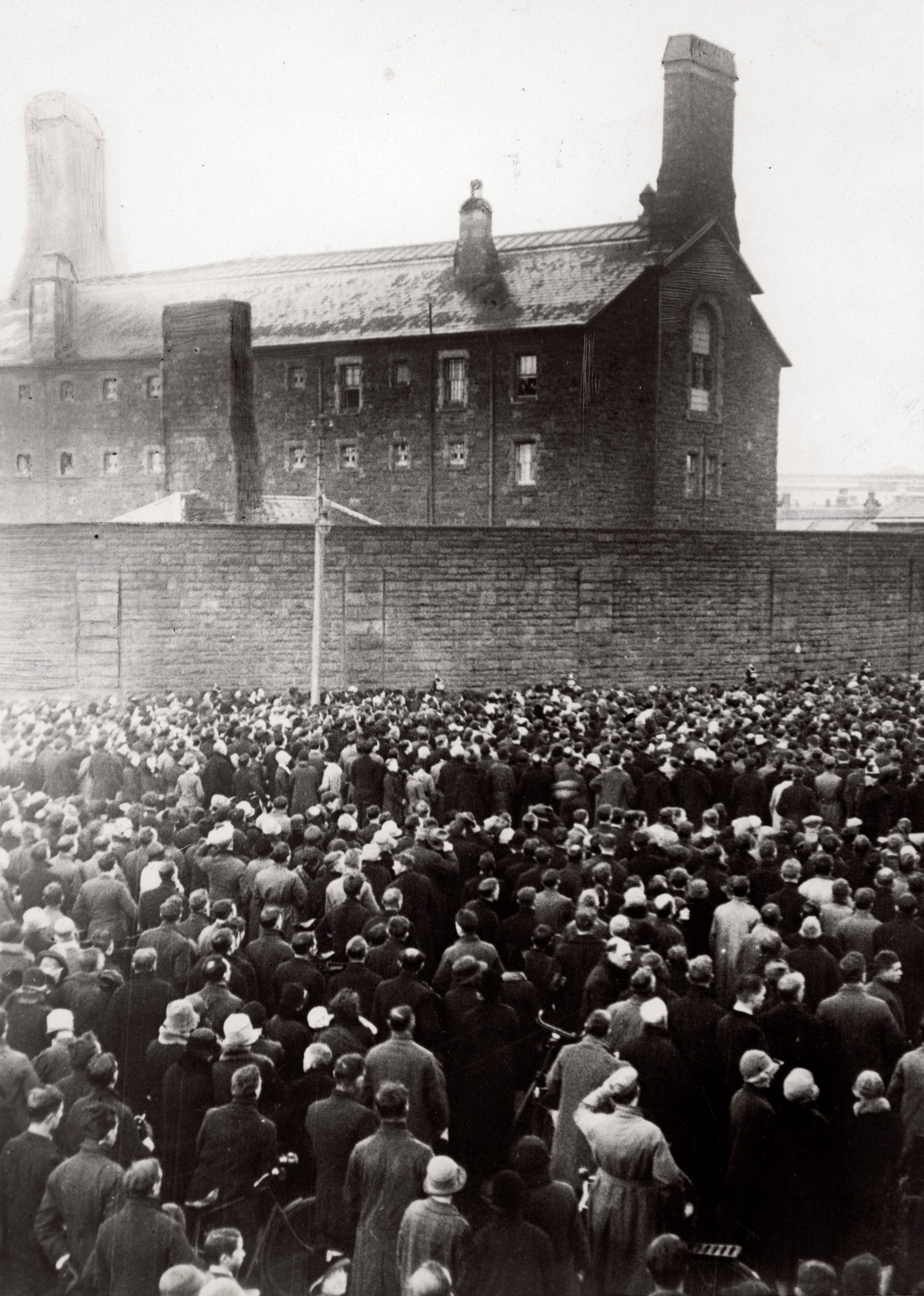
Crowd outside Cardiff Prison awaiting news of the execution

All five suspects were initially arrested. Hughes was released without charge. Four went to trial and Price was acquitted. Driscoll and Tich Rowlands gave a false alibi which when disproved, demonstrated their partial involvement, but not their guilt. John Rowlands confessed to the killing and said no-one else was involved.

The trial at Cardiff Assizes began on 29 November and was overseen by Mr Justice Wright. Lawrence Vine defended the Rowlands. The prosecution had three witnesses, two policemen and a prostitute, but none said that Driscoll or Tich Rowlands were present.

John Rowlands was found unfit to plea and was committed to Broadmoor Prison for the Criminally Insane. This element seemed to give rise to a scapegoat approach. and as John Rowlands could not be hanged. the two friends were. Despite both the victim and all witnesses saying Driscoll and Tich did not do it they were found guilty and sentenced to hang.

Driscoll and Rowlands were hanged next to each other at 8am on 27 January 1928 at Cardiff Prison. Driscoll's last words were *I am going down for something I never done - but you don't have to pay twice! Which one is mine?".

== Aftermath ==
Dai Lewis is buried in Cathays Cemetery in Cardiff. Driscoll and Tich Rowlands are buried in unmarked graves within the walls of Cardiff Prison.

== Trivia ==
The name "Daniel Driscoll" seems to have an odd connection to murder, with at least two other murders having the same name:

- Daniel Driscoll (1855-1888) American murderer, executed in 1888.
- Daniel Peter Driscoll (b.1974) British murderer who escaped from prison

In 1868, a "Daniel Driscoll" was a murder victim rather than perpetrator.

The Blue Anchor pub is now called "Peppermint".

Actor Chris Driscoll is Daniel's nephew. Chris and his solicitor Bernard de Maide began a renewed campaign in 1999 to posthumously pardon Daniel Driscoll.
