= Trade Centre Group =

British used car retailer

The Trade Centre Group PLC
- Type: Privately held company
- Industry: Automotive
- Genre: Used car sales
- Founded: 1999
- Founder: Mark Bailey
- Headquarters: Neath Abbey Business Park, Neath, Wales
- Number of locations: 6
- Area served: South Wales; West Midlands (county); North West England; South Yorkshire
- Key people: Mark Bailey (Chairman); Andy Coulthurst (Chief executive officer)
- Products: Used cars
- Services: Car finance
- Revenue: ▼£311.341 million (2023)
- Number of employees: 650+
- Parent: Bailey Family Investments PLC
- Subsidiaries: The Trade Centre Wales; The Trade Centre UK; Can Can Car Finance; Sell Your Car Today
- Website: The Trade Centre Wales; The Trade Centre UK Sell Your Car Today Can Can Car Finance

The Trade Centre Group is a used car sales company in the United Kingdom.

== History ==
=== Outside of Wales ===
The company opened their first showroom in England in early 2017 known, as "The Trade Centre UK".
