= Adamsdown =

Area and community in Cardiff, Wales

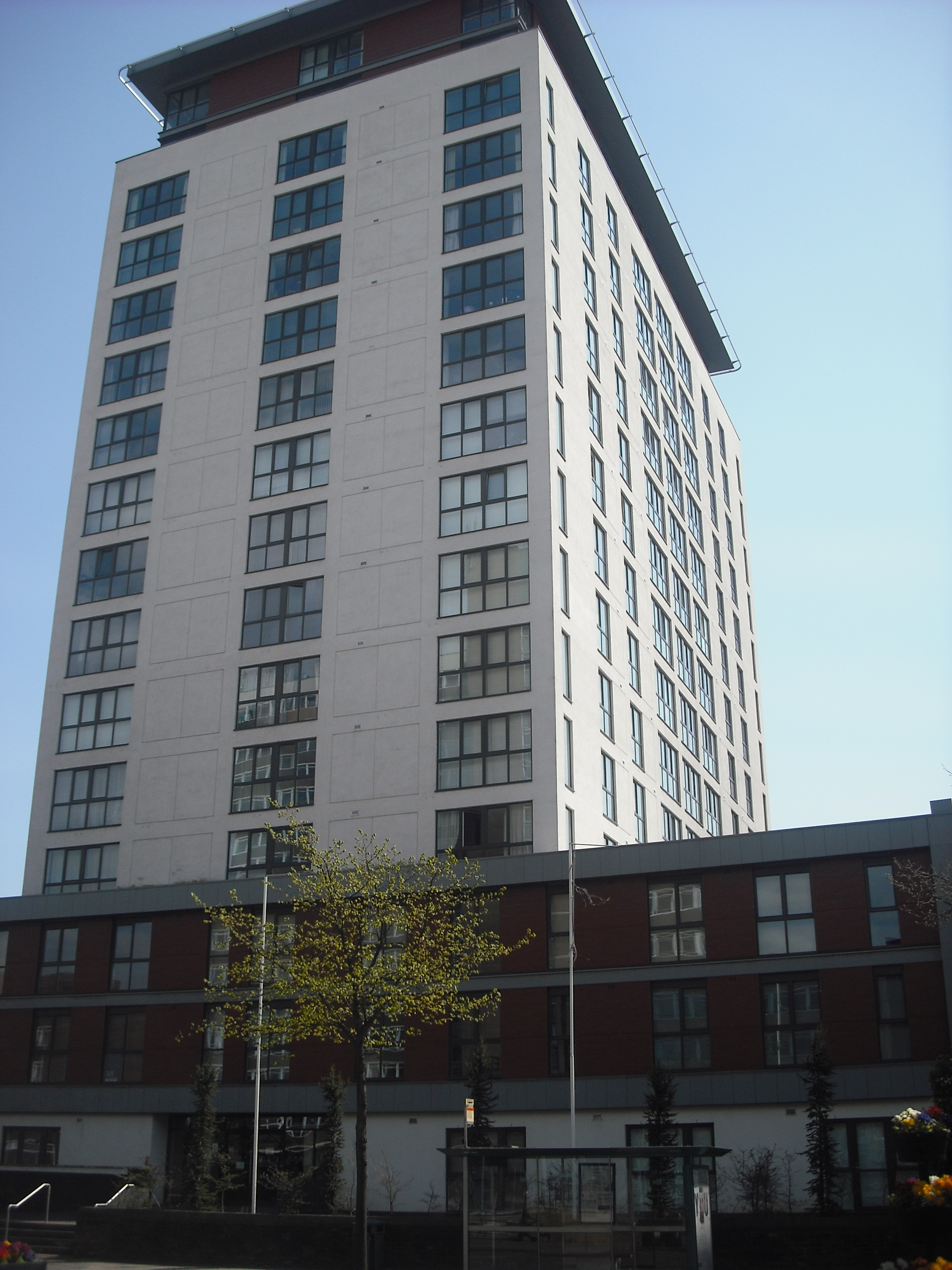
- Admiral House

- Location within Cardiff
- Population: 10,371 (2011)
- OS grid reference: ST196769
- Community: Adamsdown
- Principal area: Cardiff
- Preserved county: South Glamorgan
- Country: Wales
- Sovereign state: United Kingdom
- Post town: CARDIFF
- Postcode district: CF24
- Dialling code: 029
- Police: South Wales
- Fire: South Wales
- Ambulance: Welsh
- UK Parliament: Cardiff East
- Senedd Cymru – Welsh Parliament: Cardiff Central
- List of places UK Wales Cardiff 51.48531°N 3.15929°W Map of the community

Adamsdown (sometimes Welsh: Waunadda or Y Sblot Uchaf, 'Upper Splott') is an inner city area and community in the south of Cardiff, the capital city of Wales. Adamsdown is generally located between Newport Road, to the north and the mainline railway to the south. The area includes Cardiff Prison, Cardiff Magistrates' Court, Cardiff Royal Infirmary, a University of South Wales campus, and many streets of residential housing. There are two primary schools in the area, Adamsdown Primary School and Tredegarville Primary School.

== History ==
In mediaeval times, Adamsdown lay just outside the east walls of Cardiff and was owned by the lords of Glamorgan. The area may be named after an Adam Kygnot, a porter at Cardiff Castle around 1330 AD. The Welsh name Waunadda derives from (g)waun (a heath or down) and the personal name Adda (Adam). This name appears to be a recent creation, and there is no evidence that Adam Kygnot was ever called 'Adda'. Y Sblot Uchaf is the Welsh name of Upper Splott, a farm that stood on the site of the later Great Eastern Hotel (demolished 2009) on the corner of Sun Street and Metal Street.

According to an 1824 map, Adamsdown was largely a 270-acre (1.1 km^{2}) farm. A replacement for a prison which was located on St Mary Street opened in the area in 1832, and a cemetery in 1848. In the following year, an outbreak of cholera affected the area. As the cemetery became full, it was converted into a park. In 1883 the "South Wales and Monmouthshire Infirmary" was opened at a cost of £23,000. Many were refused from the hospital, such as those with infectious diseases and women in the advanced stages of pregnancy. In 1923, the hospital became the Cardiff Royal Infirmary.

The Newtown area of Adamsdown was the first new area to be developed, where many Irish immigrants settled. Street names are drawn from astronomy (Star, Constellation, Planet, Eclipse etc.), metals (Gold, Copper, Tin, Zinc, etc.) or jewellery (Topaz, Pearl, Agate, Saphire etc.).

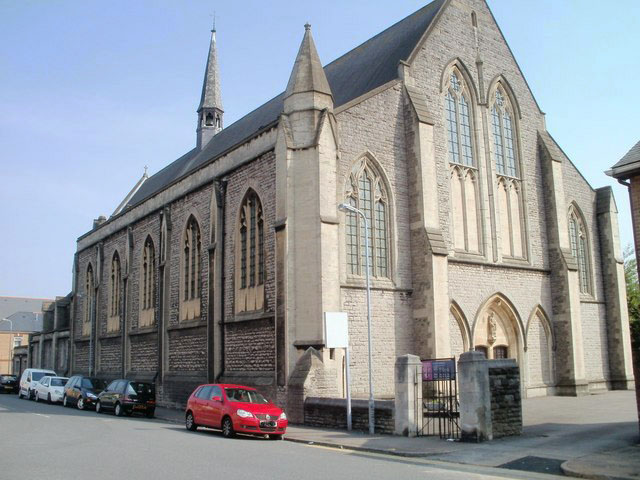
St German's Church

The Church of St German of Auxerre, Star Street, was designed by Bodley & Garner and built 1881–84. It is described as "tall, spacious and elegant", also with a contemporary school house. The church is Grade I listed.

Cardiff's first municipal secondary school was established at Howard Gardens in 1884, which became a Grammar School in 1941. It was destroyed by bombing in World War II, and a Cardiff Metropolitan University campus now stands on the site.

Until the 1970s, Roath Cattle Market and Slaughterhouse were located in Adamsdown. One could obtain meats illicitly off-ration during World War II. Regeneration of Adamsdown in the 20th century saw Victorian buildings demolished for 1960s and 70s tower blocks, the highest of which is Brunel House, at the eastern gateway to Cardiff city centre.

=== Vulcan Hotel ===
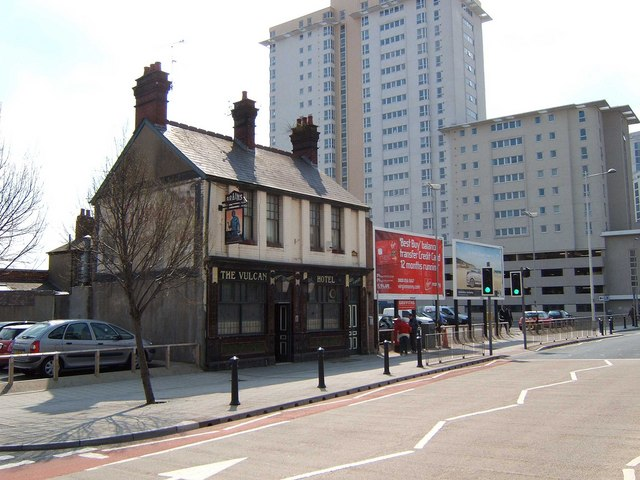
The Vulcan, April 2008, on its original site, looking towards high-rise private apartment and student housing of Tŷ Pont Haearn

The Vulcan Hotel was a hotel and public house built in 1853, located on the south side of Adam Street. It remained unchanged although adjoining Victorian buildings were demolished and redeveloped around it.

In 2012, Brains Brewery confirmed that they were to terminate their lease on the property. Marcol Asset Management agreed to donate the building to the St Fagans National History Museum. From July 2012, the building was taken down by contractors and preservationists, to allow brick-by-brick movement to St Fagans, styled as a "between the wars" 1920-1930s period exhibit.

== Today ==
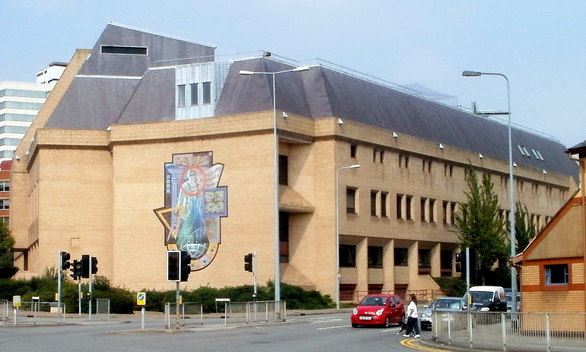
Cardiff Magistrates' Court

Cardiff Magistrates' Court, Cardiff Prison, Cardiff Royal Infirmary, the Cardiff School of Creative and Cultural Industries of the University of South Wales, Cardiff Reform Synagogue, and several Sikh temples can be found in this district and a mosque is under construction.

Adamsdown is one of the older working-class suburbs of Cardiff. It is about 10 minutes' walk from the commercial Cardiff city centre. It is largely a residential area, but is also home to the Rubicon Dance school. Adamsdown has undergone regeneration, in particular the shopping area of Clifton Street, where the traditional stone buildings such as Roath Police station have been sandblasted and renovated, most of the shop fronts have been replaced and updated, the pavements have been widened and a new one-way traffic system has been introduced. The aim of this was to attract more traders and shoppers to the area.

== Adamsdown electoral ward ==
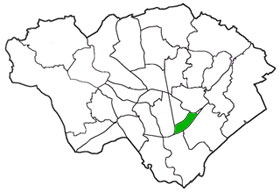
Adamsdown ward shown within Cardiff

Adamsdown is both an electoral ward, and a community of the City of Cardiff. There is no community council for the area. The Adamsdown electoral ward is within the UK parliamentary constituency of Cardiff East and Senedd constituency of Cardiff Central.. It is bounded by the wards of Penylan to the north east; Splott to the south east; Butetown to the south; Cathays to the west; and Plasnewydd to the north. In the 2016 local elections Nigel Howells (Lib Dem) and Owen Llewellyn Jones (Labour) were elected Councillors.

== Transport ==
Cardiff Queen Street station is on the western fringe of Adamsdown. The station is on the Valley Lines urban rail network.

The area is also served by Cardiff Bus. Services stopping outside the Cardiff Royal Infirmary, which all go to City Centre in the reverse direction are:

- 11 (Pengam Green via Splott and Tremorfa)
- 30 (Newport)
- 44/45 (St. Mellons via Rumney)
- 49/50 (Llanrumney)

The 11 route runs through the heart of the area connecting it with Tremorfa/Splott to the east and the City Centre to the west. The 1/2 Bay Circle route also serves some parts of the area.

The busy and commercial Newport Road (A4161) runs through northern Adamsdown, leading towards the M4 motorway to the east and the city centre to the west. City Road leads to northern districts of Cardiff.

== Notable people ==
- John Humphrys – TV broadcaster, best known for hosting Mastermind from 2003 to 2021

== See also ==
- Royal Oak, Cardiff
