= Sight Life =

Welsh visually impaired support charity

Sight Life, known as Cardiff Institute for the Blind (CIB) until 2019, is Cardiff's oldest charity, founded in 1865 and offering support to visually impaired residents of Cardiff and the Vale of Glamorgan.

== History ==
Cardiff Institute for the Blind was founded in April 1865 by Frances Batty Shand, the daughter of a Jamaican plantation owner. It was initially called The Association for Improving the Social and Working Conditions of the Blind.

After moving to Cardiff, Shand set up a small workshop employing five blind men to make baskets for coal ships. After employing ten more men, the workshop was relocated to Byron Street in Roath, then in 1868 moving to Longcross Road near the institute's former home, on Newport Road.

By 1900, around 100 blind men and women were employed making baskets, brushes and mats.

The Longcross Street building was destroyed during World War II. A plot of land situated on Newport Road was donated to the charity in 1949 - and made way for Shand House completed and opened in 1953.

The Institute celebrated their 140th birthday in 2005 with a march through Queen Street, followed by a party. By this date the CIB was helping 7,500 people with visual impairments, funded by £350,000 raised by the charity.

The Institute remained at Shand House until October 2012, when they moved to a temporary accommodation in Bridge Street until their new headquarters in Womanby Street, Cardiff, was completed. They share the new offices with the Royal National Institute for the Blind (RNIB).

CIB rebranded itself as "Sight Life", effective from 15 January 2020. The change was made because the charity worked across the whole of South Wales, rather than just Cardiff. A new logo and website address was required.

== Services ==
CIB offers support and services for visually impaired people in Cardiff and the Vale of Glamorgan.

Music Club CIB has launched a Music Club, open to all.

Computer Club The institute's Computer Club has provided tens of thousands of training sessions for visually impaired people.

== Campaigning ==
Working alongside RNIB, CIB has campaigned to gain equality for the visually impaired in receiving Disability Allowance.
