= Royal Arcade, Cardiff =

Shopping arcade in Cardiff, Wales

Coordinates: 51°28′43″N 3°10′37″W

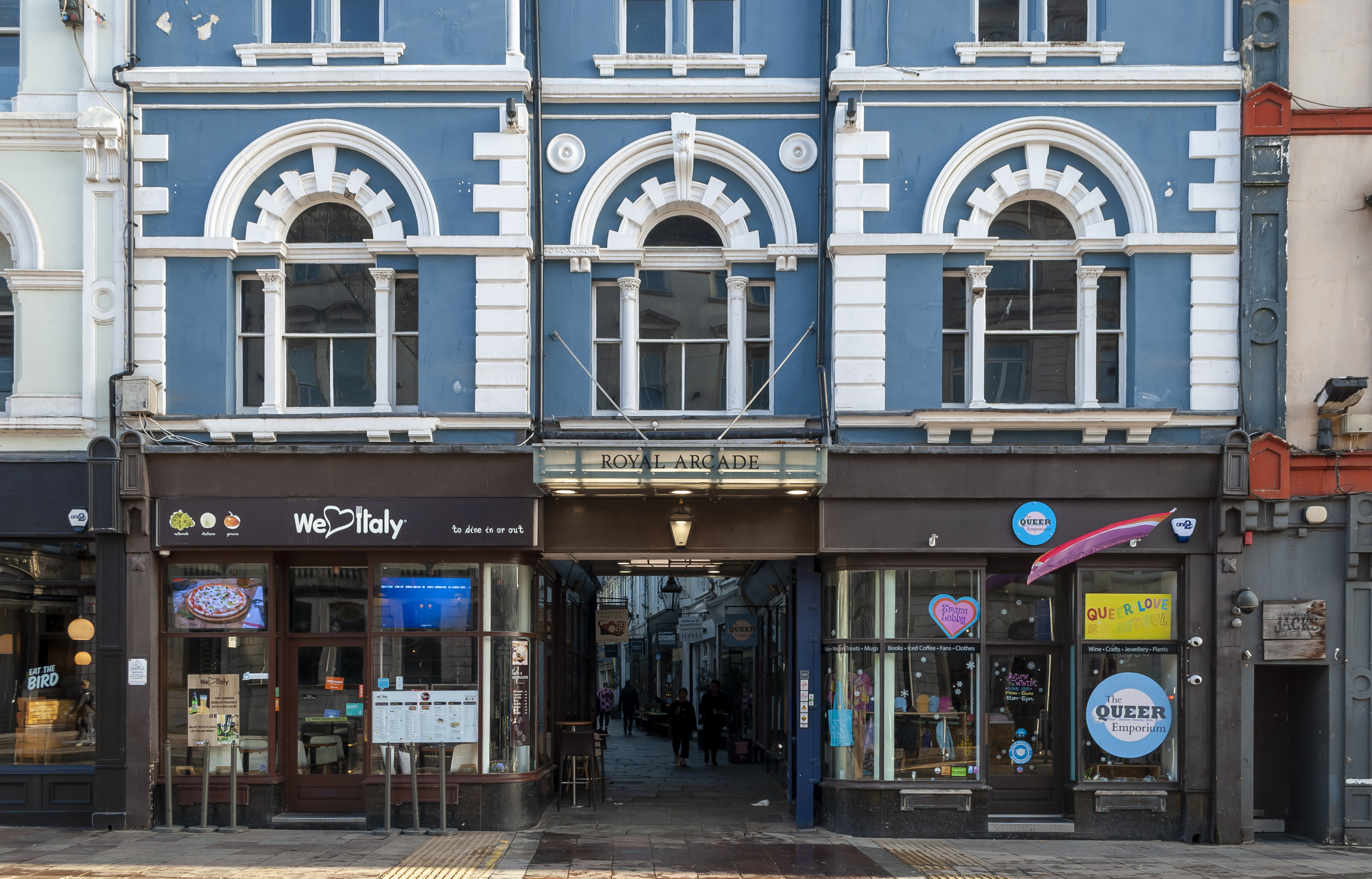
The façade on St Mary Street

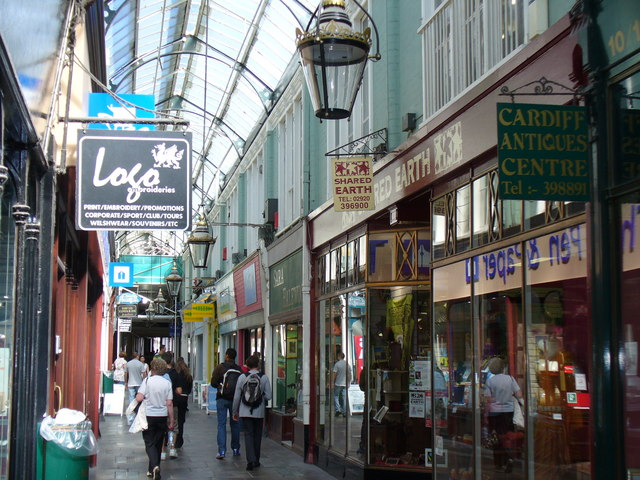
Inside the Royal Arcade

The Royal Arcade is a shopping arcade in Cardiff, South Wales.

The Royal Arcade is the oldest arcade in Cardiff, being built in 1858, it is a Grade II listed building. In 1861, a free library was set up by voluntary subscription above the St Mary Street entrance to the Royal Arcade in Cardiff. Before the end of the 19th century the Cardiff School of art was using rooms above the arcade with students such as J. M. Staniforth and Goscombe John attending. Running east–west from The Hayes to St Mary's Street, parallel but to the south of the Morgan Arcade, it also runs under David Morgan's department store. After Morgans bought the Royal Arcade, the family formed a holding company called the Cardiff Arcade Company, which owned and operated both the Royal and the Morgan arcades.

After the agreed closure of David Morgan's, the property assets inside the various holdings companies were sold in late 2004 for £25 million to property firm Helical Bar. David Morgan Limited, Deymel Investments Limited and the Cardiff Arcade Company Limited are now all in liquidation.

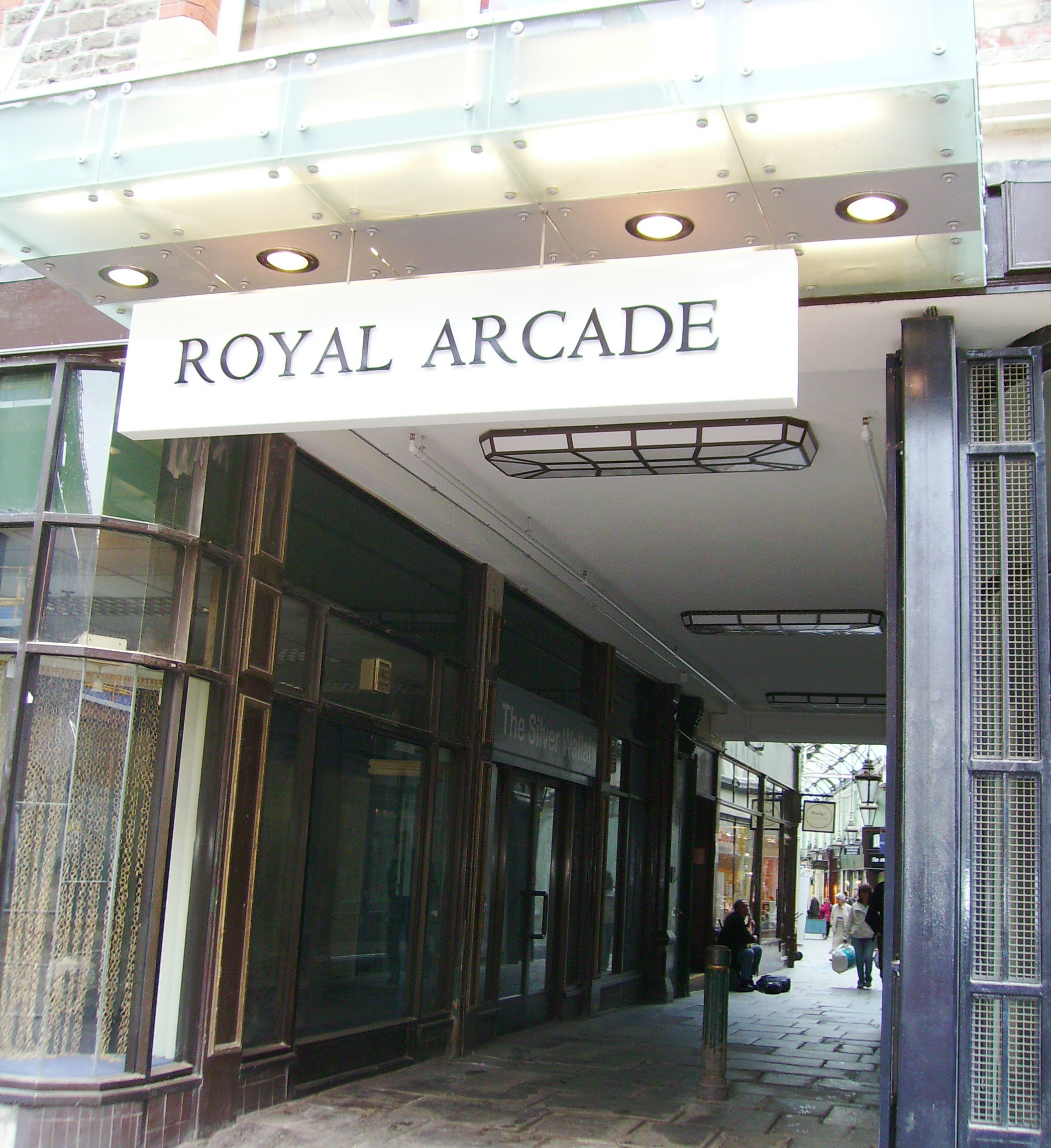
The entrance to the Royal Arcade, from The Hayes

Between 2007 and 2008 the whole site was refurbished by Helical Bar, with the arcades restored. The companies spent £30M on restoring both the Morgan and Royal arcades, with some first-floor Venetian windows and original wooden storefronts still surviving.

Today the Royal Arcade still has some of the original shopfronts at numbers 29, 30 and 32 on St. Mary Street. Running direct opposite from the new St. David's 2 development and close to Cardiff Central Library, a variety of independent shops are still to be found such as Wally's Delicatessen, who have been in the arcade for 60 years, and those specialising in Welsh textiles, gifts and homeware.

== See also ==
- List of shopping arcades in Cardiff
