= Cardiff Gaol =

Former prison (gaol) in Cardiff, Wales

Cardiff Gaol was a prison located on St. Mary Street, Cardiff, Wales. Prior to its construction, people were imprisoned in Cardiff Castle.

== Background ==
Cardiff's original court and gaol were located within the walls of Cardiff Castle. Whilst the court moved within the castle walls, the gaol was always located within the Black Tower. The earliest surviving gaol record is a Gaol Calendar from 1542, at which time the castle was still used. After the Town Hall was built in the High Street in 1331, its main space included a court room, which resulted in the construction of a holding gaol in the basement.

== Operations ==
A new gaol was established in Cardiff in the 16th century, occupying a site on the High Street. In 1770, improvements and expansions were undertaken. The gallows were located on the site of the current St. Mary Street entrance to Cardiff Market, where Dic Penderyn was hanged on August 13, 1831.

By 1814, the gaol was deemed insufficient, and after lands were secured south of Crockherbtown, construction took place, with the new Cardiff Prison opening at the end of 1832. This prison took over the county jail duties, but the gaol continued as the town jail. After the Home Office took over responsibility for corrections in the Prison Act 1877, the prison was expanded and the gaol finally closed.

After demolition, the site became the new location of Cardiff Market.
