= Morgan Arcade =

Shopping arcade in Cardiff, Wales

Coordinates: 51.47879°N 3.17707°W

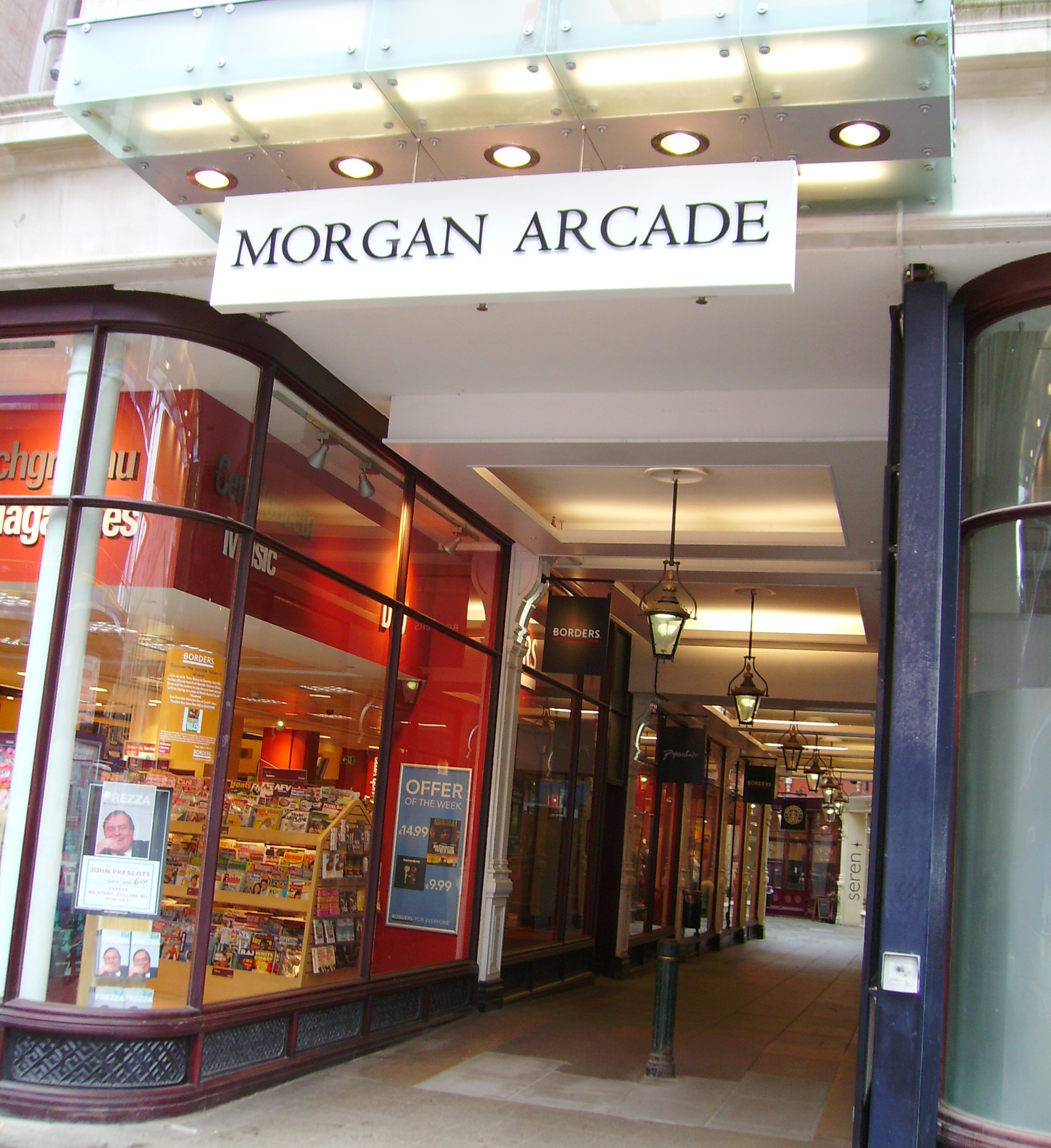
The entrance to the Morgan Arcade, from The Hayes

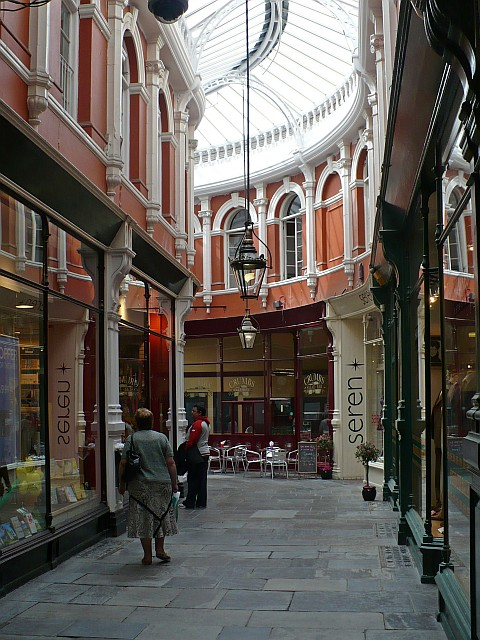
Morgan Arcade, showing venetian windows and original wooden store fronts

The Morgan Arcade is a shopping arcade in Cardiff, South Wales.

Started in 1896, it was built to connect the main entrance of David Morgan's department store on St Mary's Street, with his other store on The Hayes. It opened in 1899 as the New Central Arcade, running east–west from Hayes to St. Mary's Street.

After Morgans bought the Royal Arcade, the family formed a holding company called the Cardiff Arcade Company, which owned and operated both the Royal and renamed Morgan arcades, which both ran underneath the store.

After the agreed closure of David Morgan's, the property assets inside the various holdings companies were sold in late 2004 for £25 million to property firm Helical Bar. David Morgan Limited, Deymel Investments Limited and the Cardiff Arcade Company Limited are now all in liquidation.

Between 2007 and 2008 the whole site was refurbished by Helical Bar, with the arcades restored. The companies spent £30M on restoring both the Morgan and Royal arcades, with some first-floor Venetian windows and original wooden storefronts still surviving. The Morgan Arcade is now described as the best preserved of Cardiff's arcades.

== See also ==
- List of shopping arcades in Cardiff
