= St Mary Street/High Street =

Streets in Cardiff, Wales

Coordinates: 51.47823°N 3.17799°W

St Mary Street

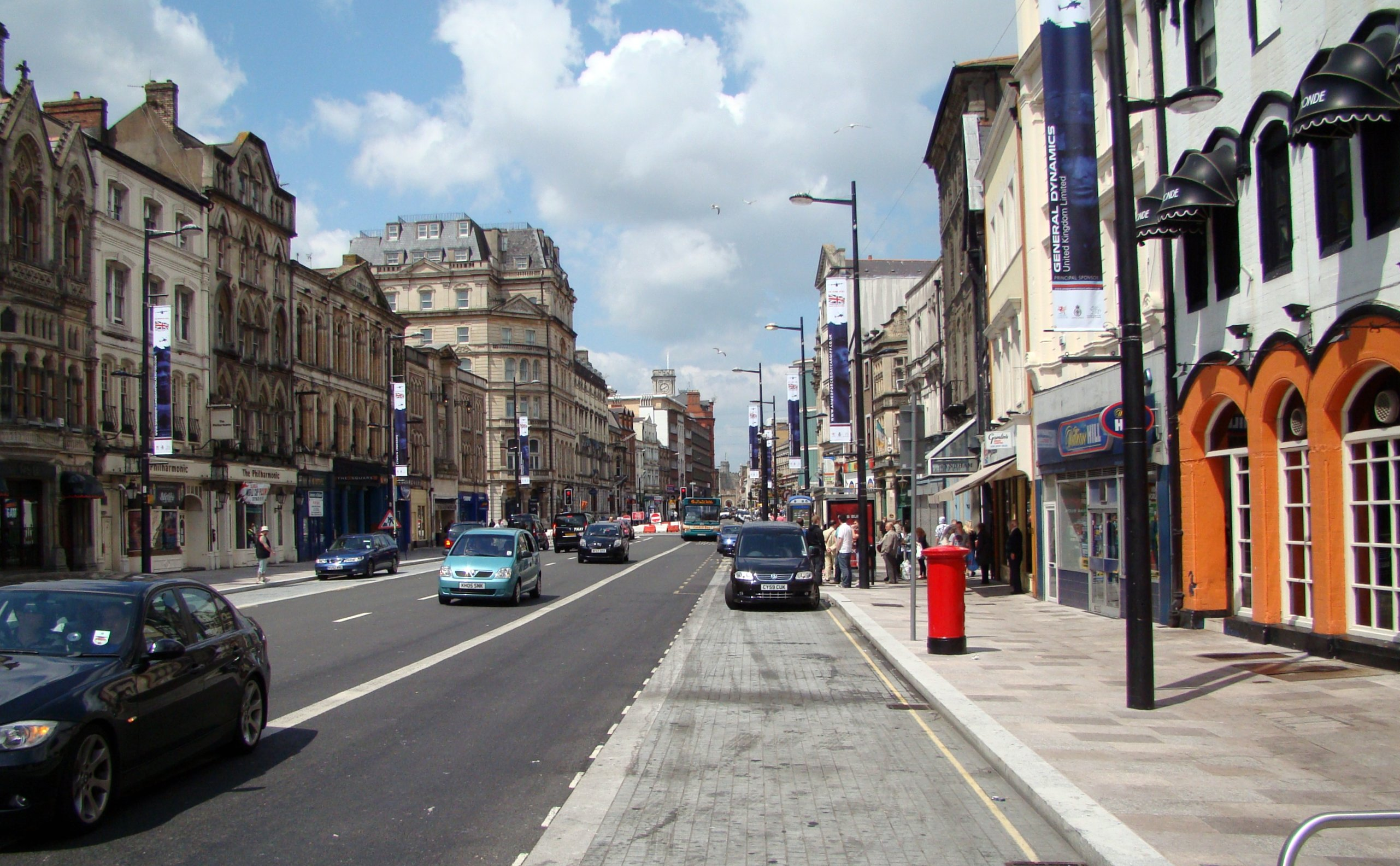
Image taken in 2010

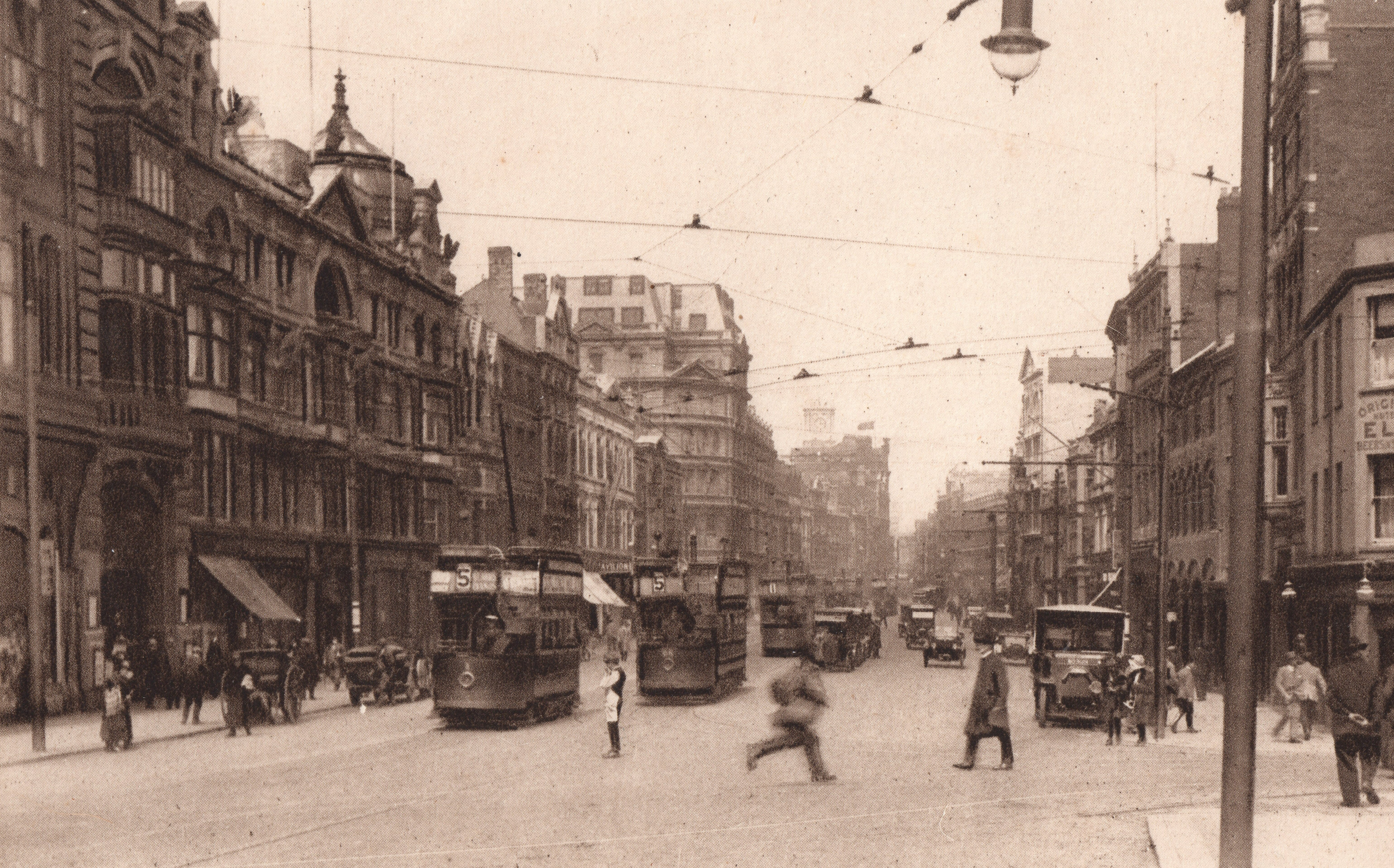
Image taken in the 1920s

St Mary Street (Welsh: Heol Eglwys Fair) and High Street (Welsh: Heol Fawr) are major commercial streets in the Castle Quarter of Cardiff city centre, Wales, which form a major thoroughfare running south from the gatehouse of Cardiff Castle. High Street begins at the junction of Castle Street on the A4161 and ends at the junction of Church Street and Quay Street, from where St Mary Street begins until the roundabout at Callaghan Square on the A4160.

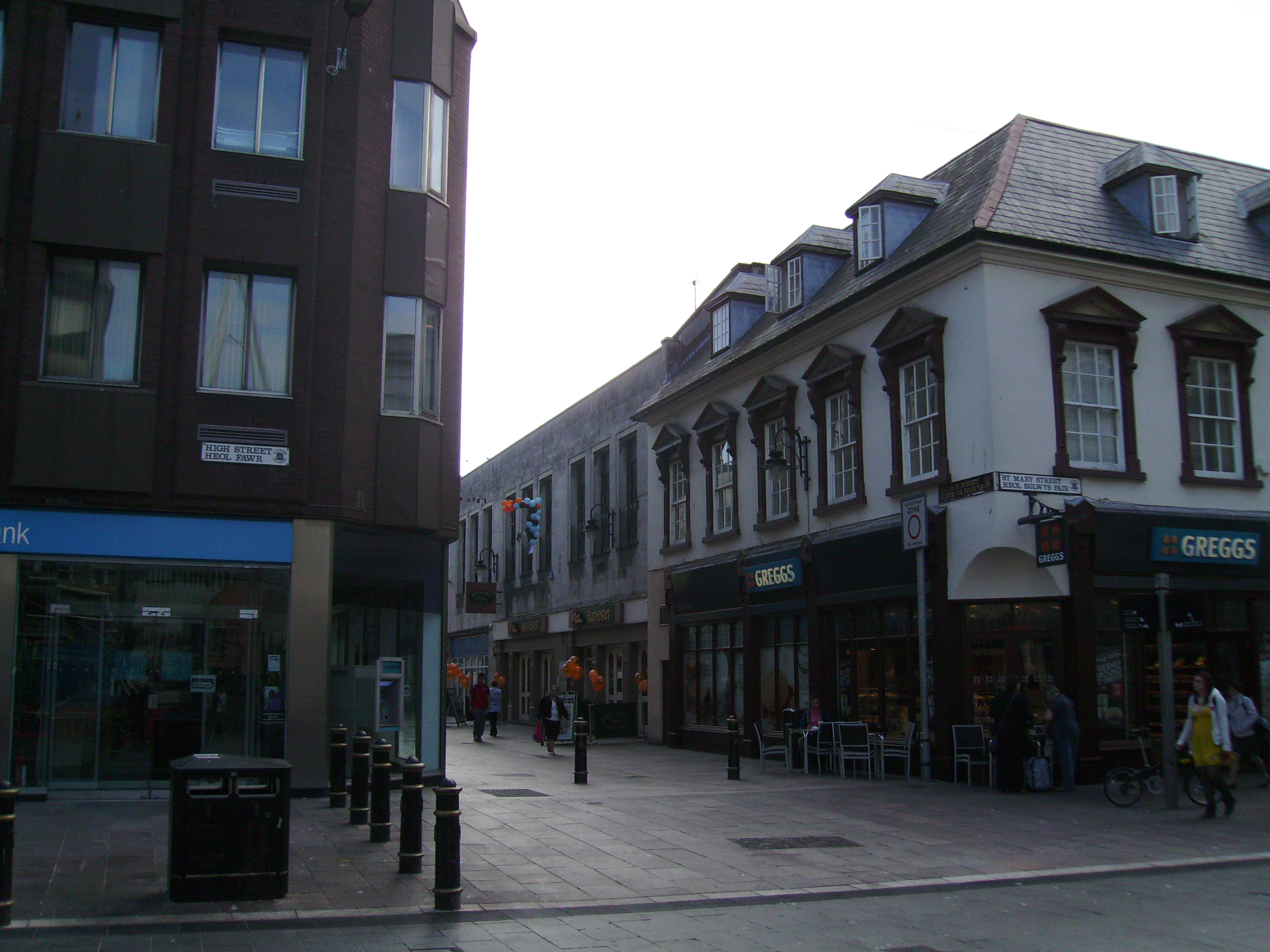
At the junction of Church Street, High Street (left) and St. Mary Street (right)

In the 21st century, the thoroughfare has become the location for a wide variety of pubs, bars, restaurants, cafes and coffeeshops.

== Notable buildings ==
=== Present buildings ===
- House of Fraser, formerly Howells department store
- Cardiff Market
- Hodge House
- Prince of Wales Theatre (now a pub)
- High Street Arcade
- Morgan Arcade
- Royal Arcade
- Royal Hotel

=== Demolished buildings ===
- Cardiff Town Hall (1747), demolished
- Cardiff Town Hall (1853), demolished
- Cardiff Gaol, demolished to make way for Cardiff Market
- YMCA building

=== Cardiff Free Library ===
- The first Cardiff Free Library was located above the St. Mary Street entrance to the Royal Arcade

=== Public art ===
- Statue of the Second Marquess of Bute, located in the street from 1853 until 1999, when it moved to Bute Square.
- The former Pierhead Clock, installed in a glass box with three monkeys striking the chimes, near the Royal Hotel in 2011.

Buildings past and present
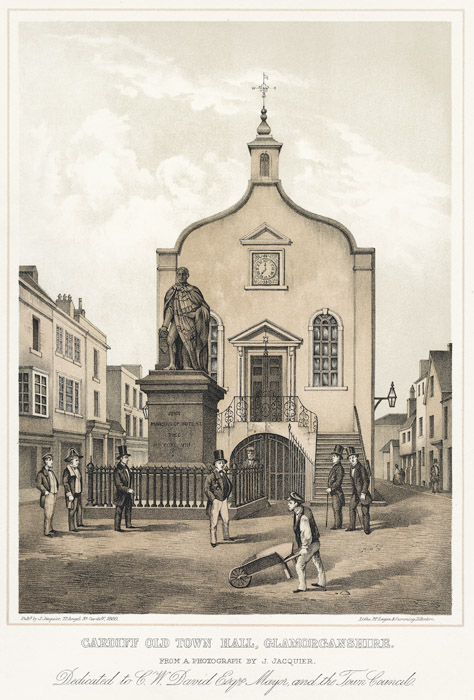
Cardiff Town Hall
(demolished 1861)

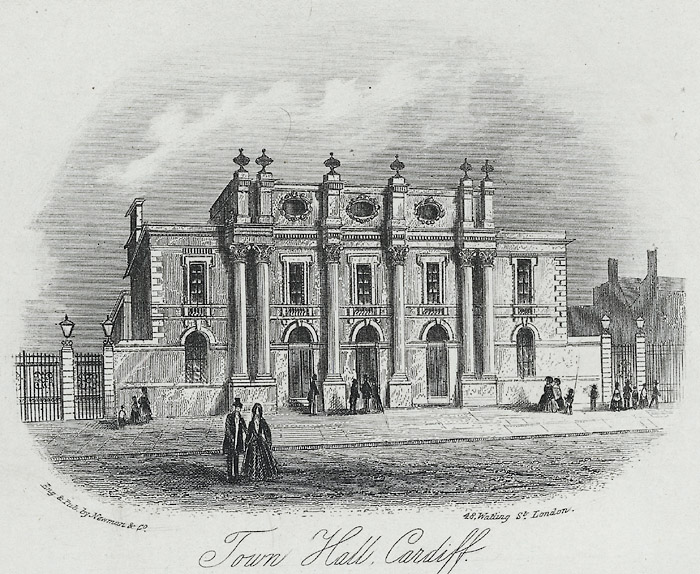
The former 1853 Cardiff Town Hall
(demolished in 1914)

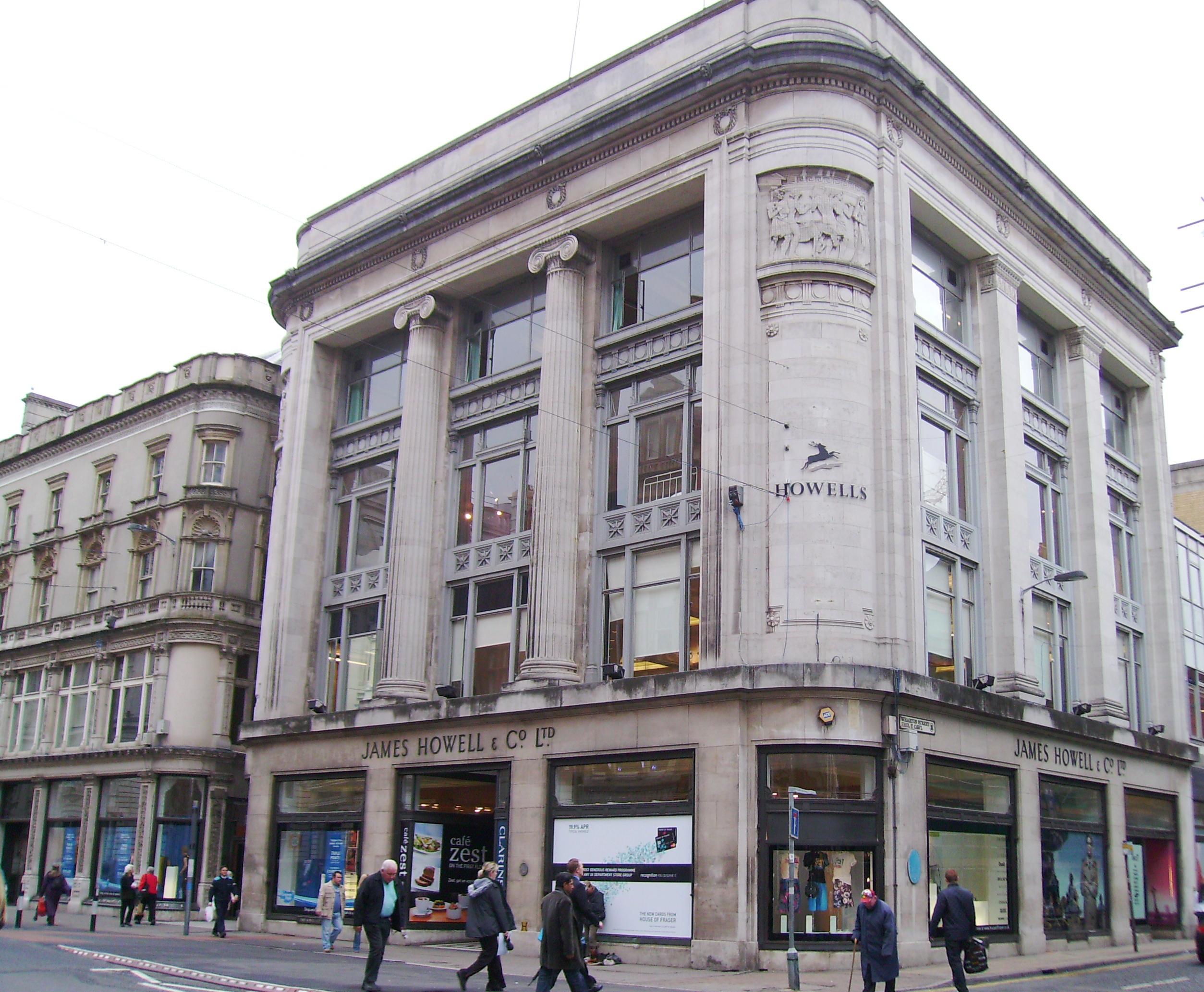
The former Howells department store (Grade II* listed

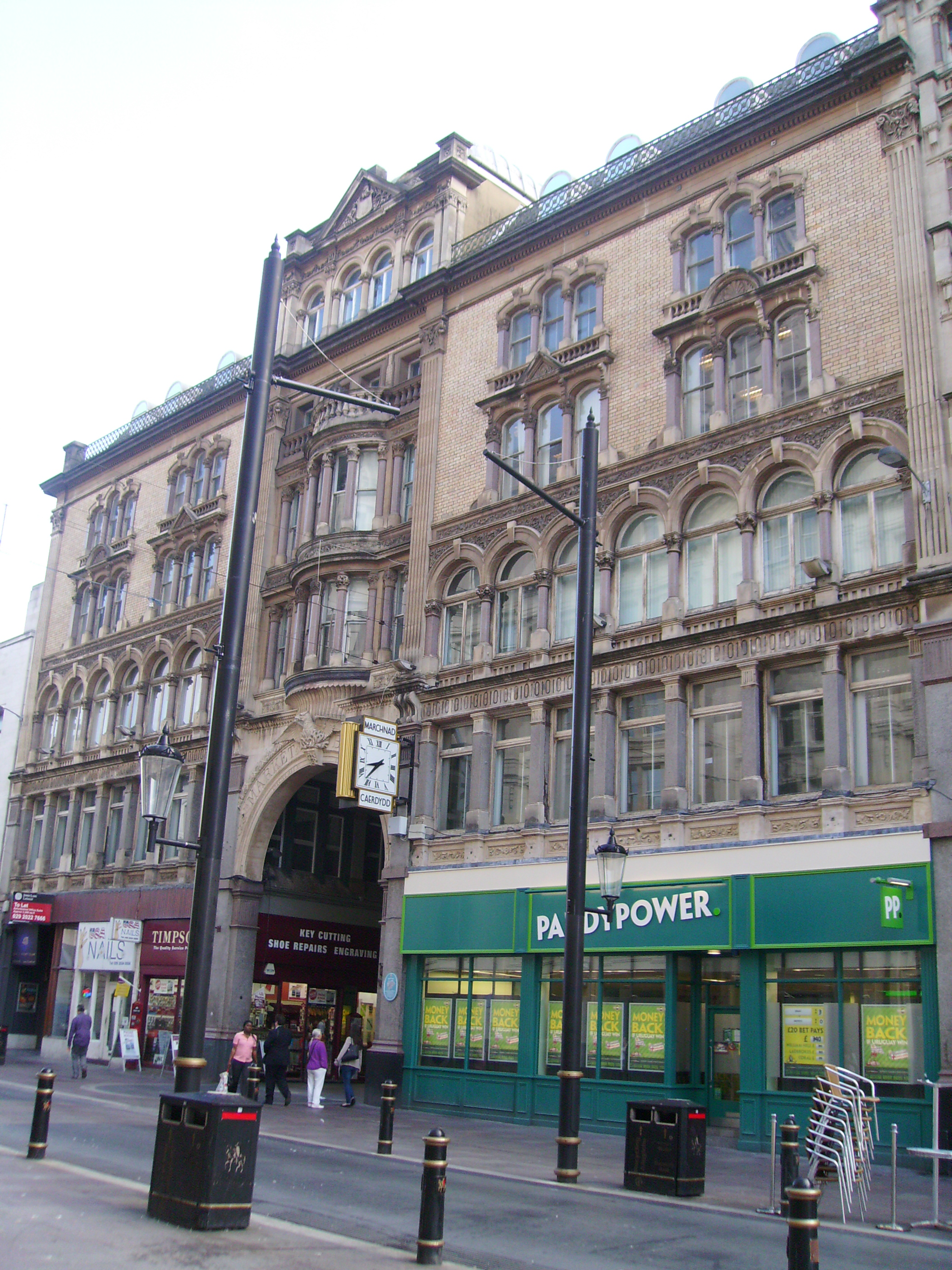
Cardiff Market (Grade II* listed)

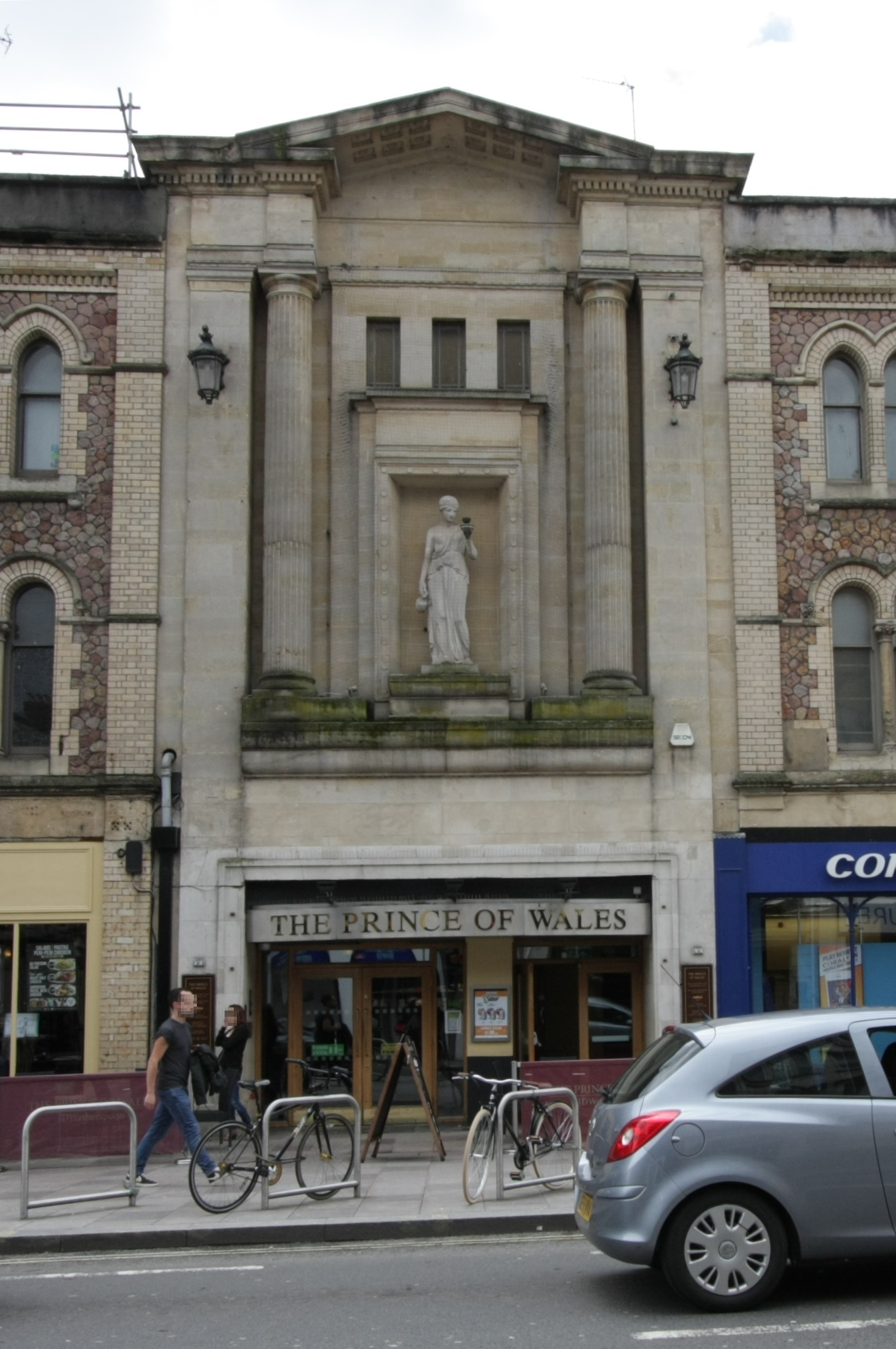
The former Prince of Wales Theatre, now The Prince of Wales pub (Grade-II listed)

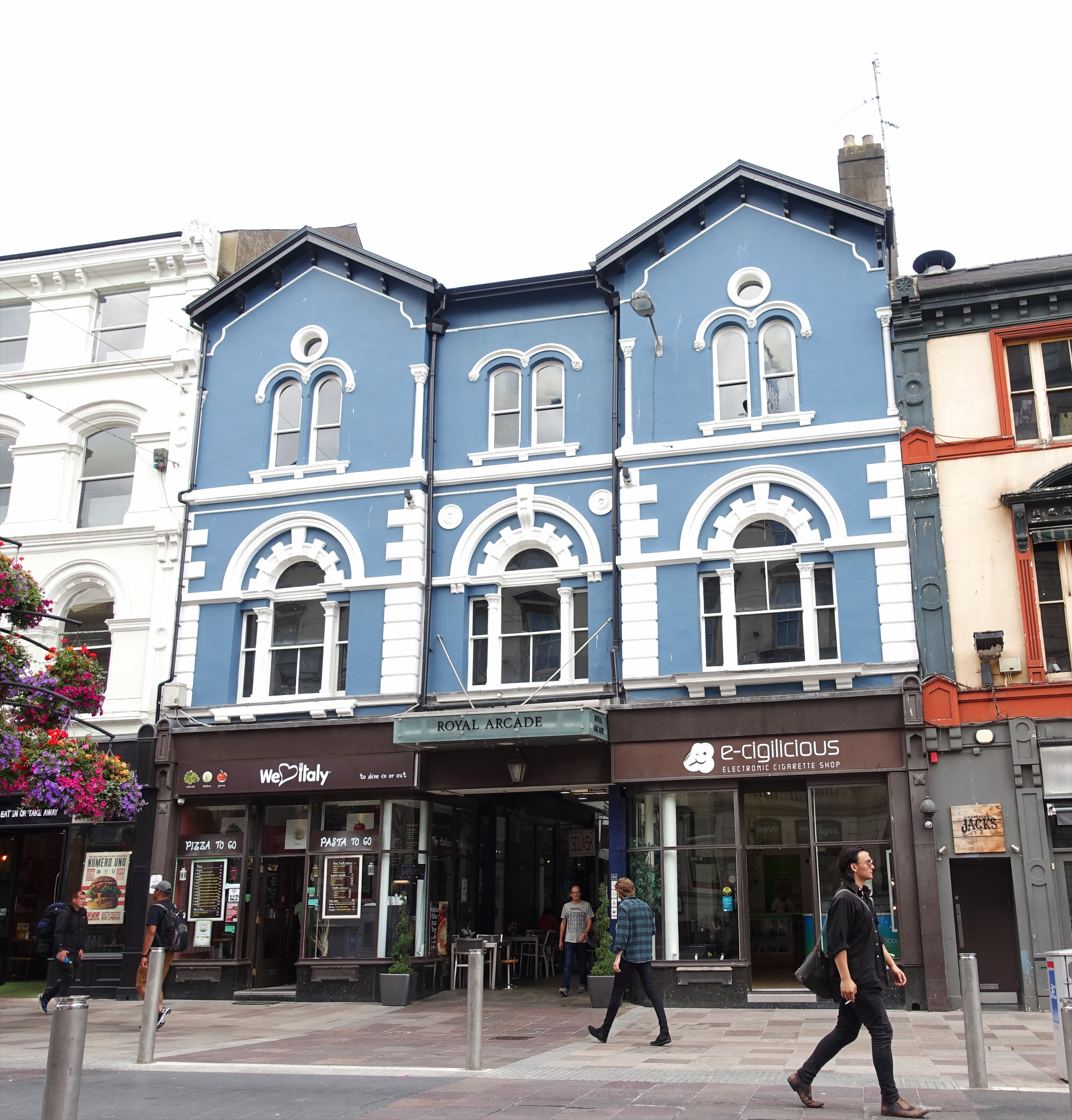
Royal Arcade (Grade II listed)

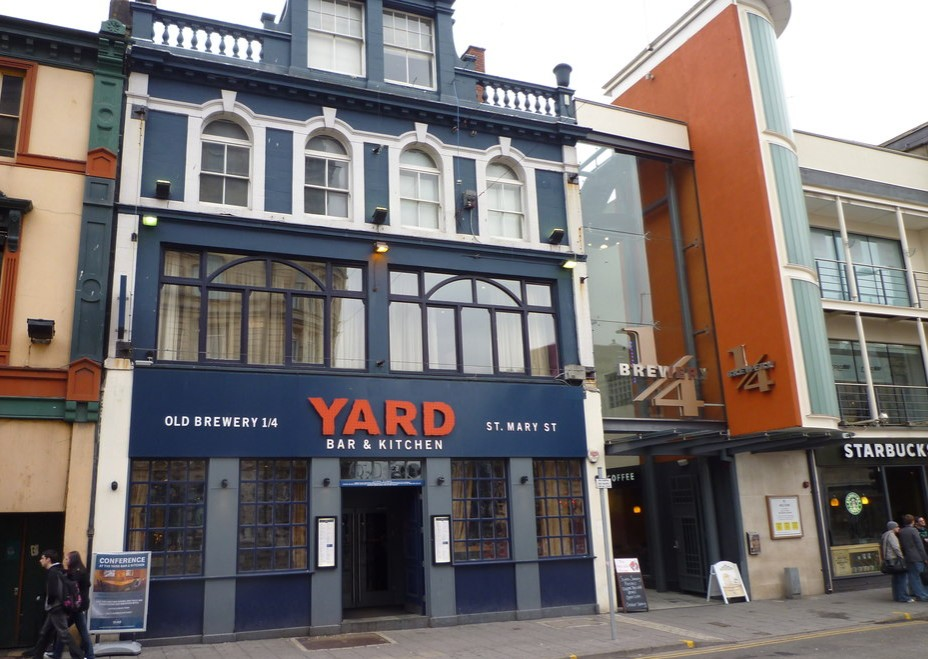
The Yard pub and entrance to the Brewery Quarter

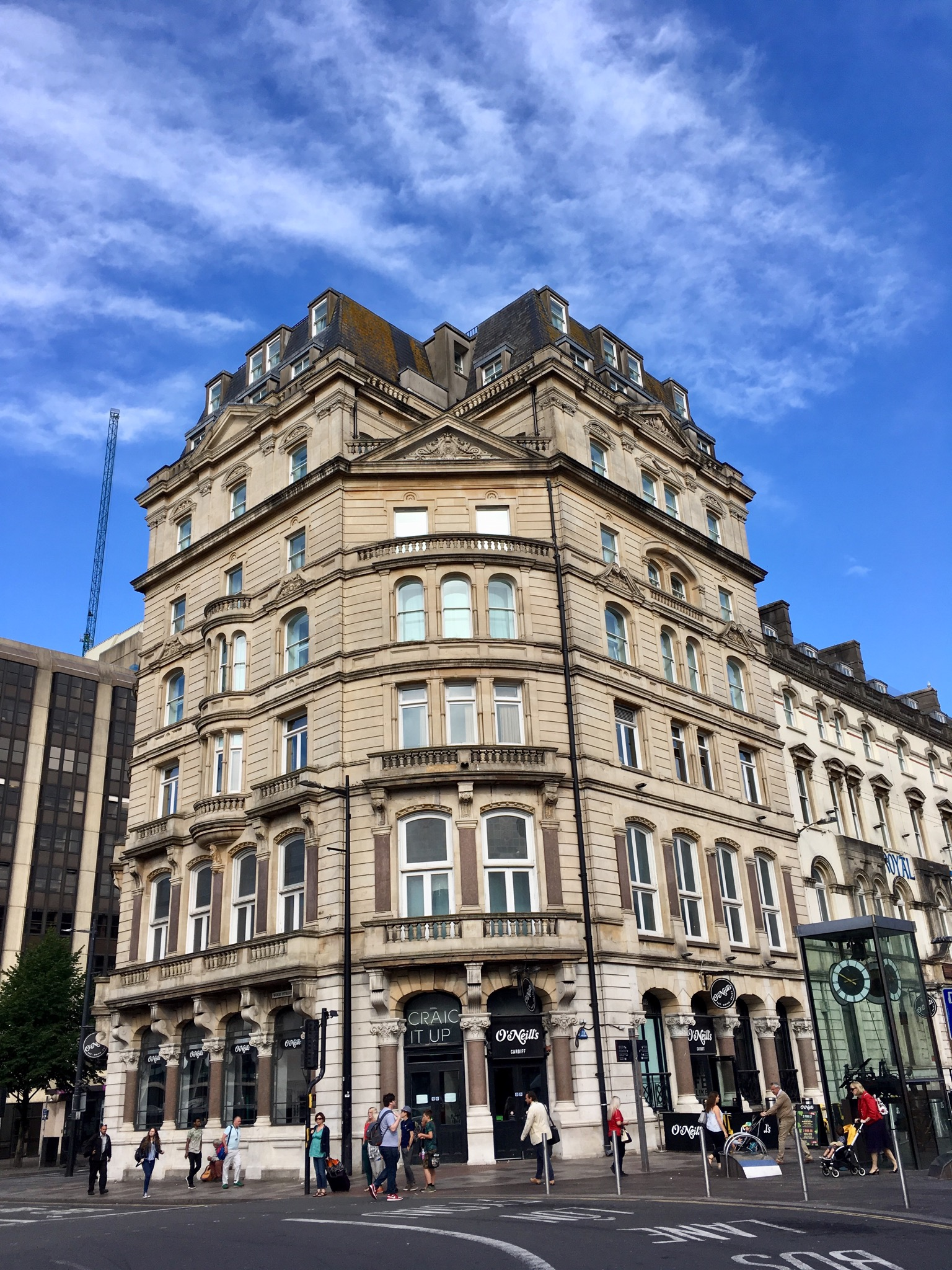
The Royal Hotel (Grade-II listed)

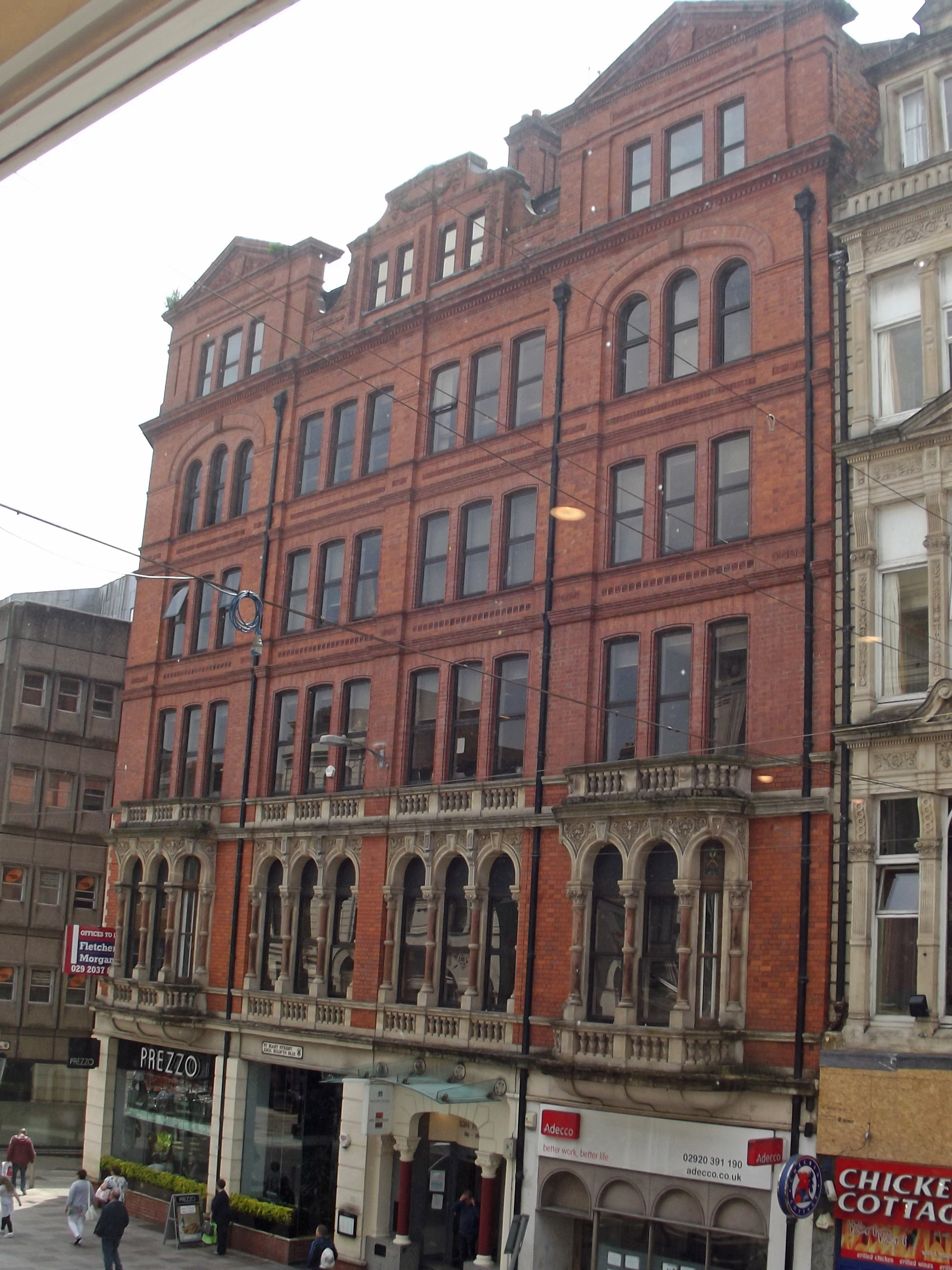
Elgin House (Grade II listed)

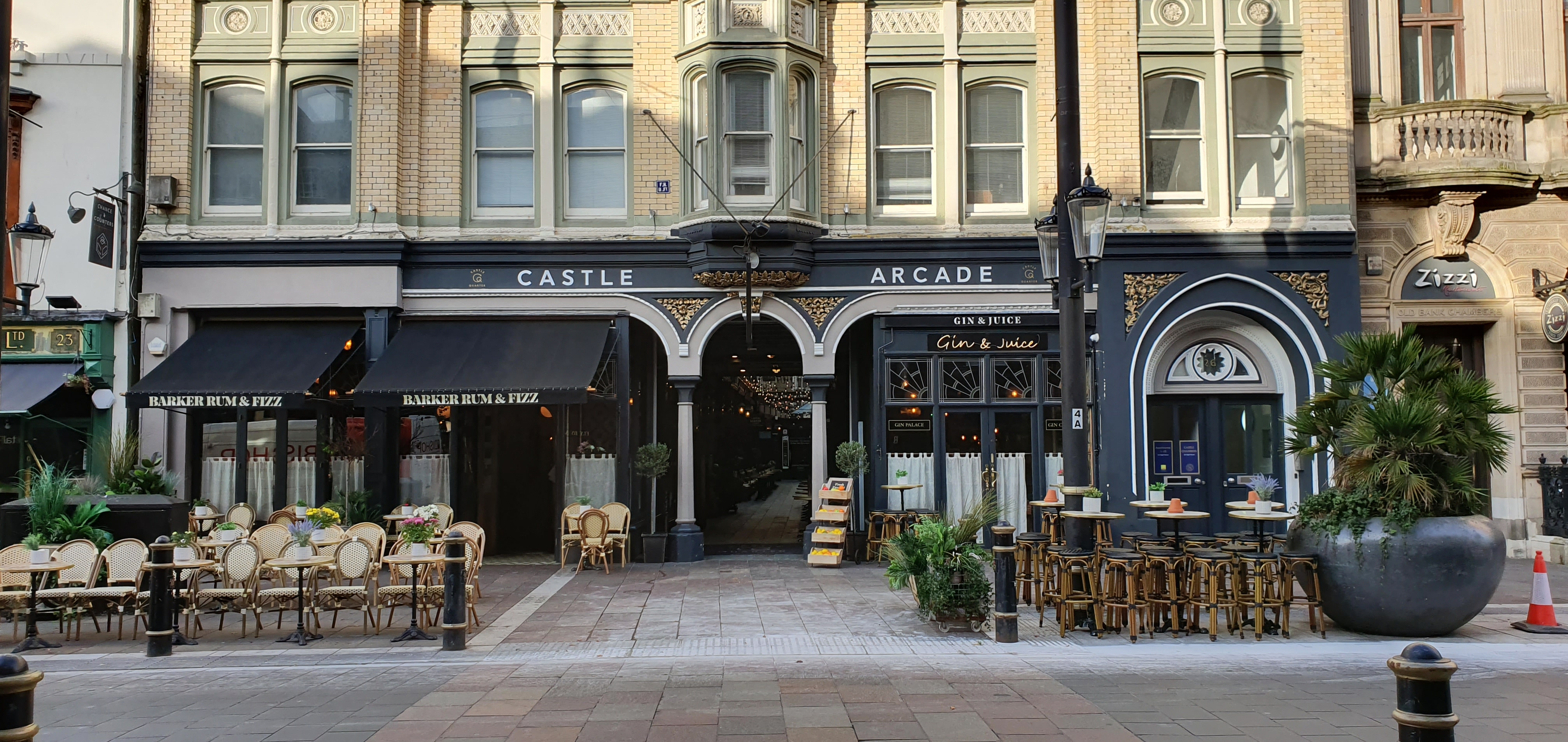
Castle Arcade (Grade II* listed)

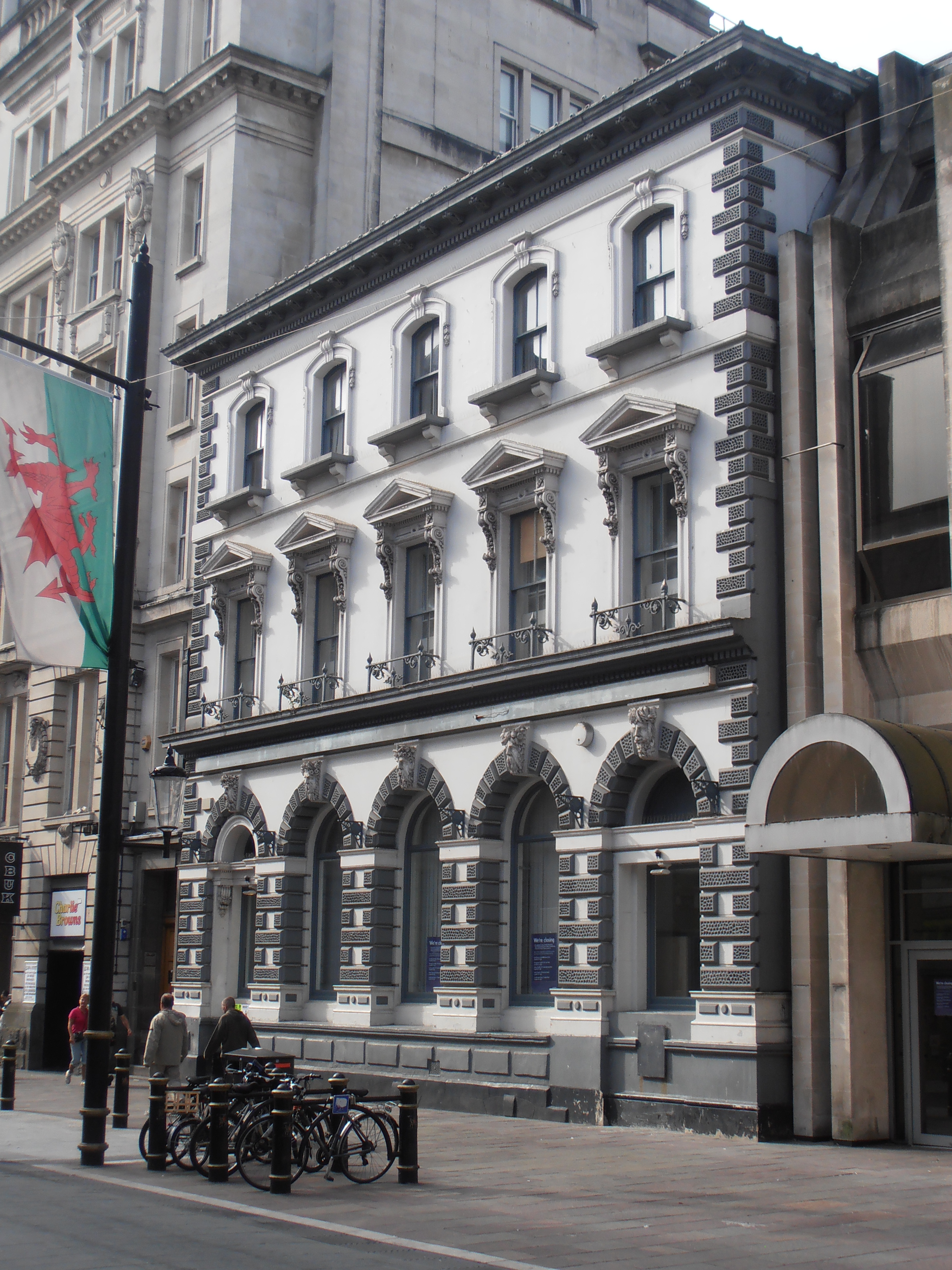
The former NatWest Bank (Grade II listed)

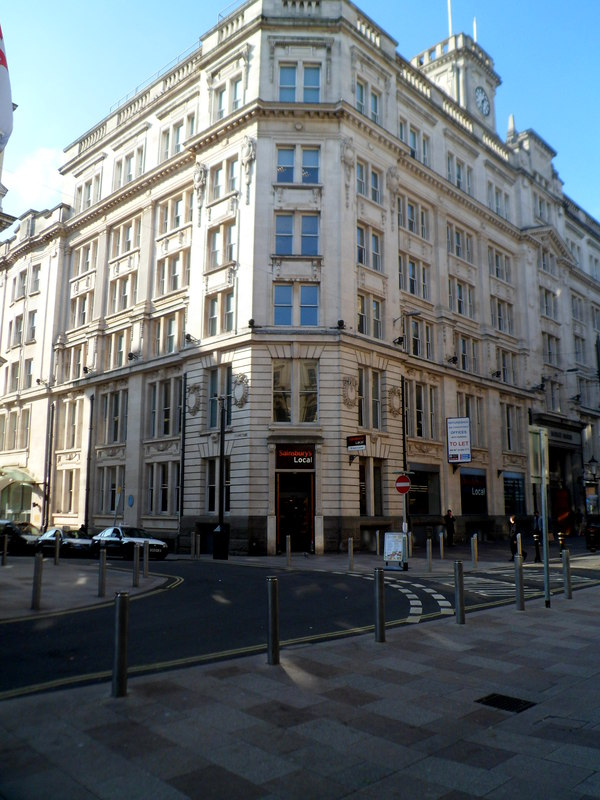
Hodge House (Grade II listed)
