= Castle Quarter (Cardiff) =

Area of Cardiff, Wales

Coordinates: 51.48°N 3.175°W

Castle Quarter: Welsh: Cwr y Castell
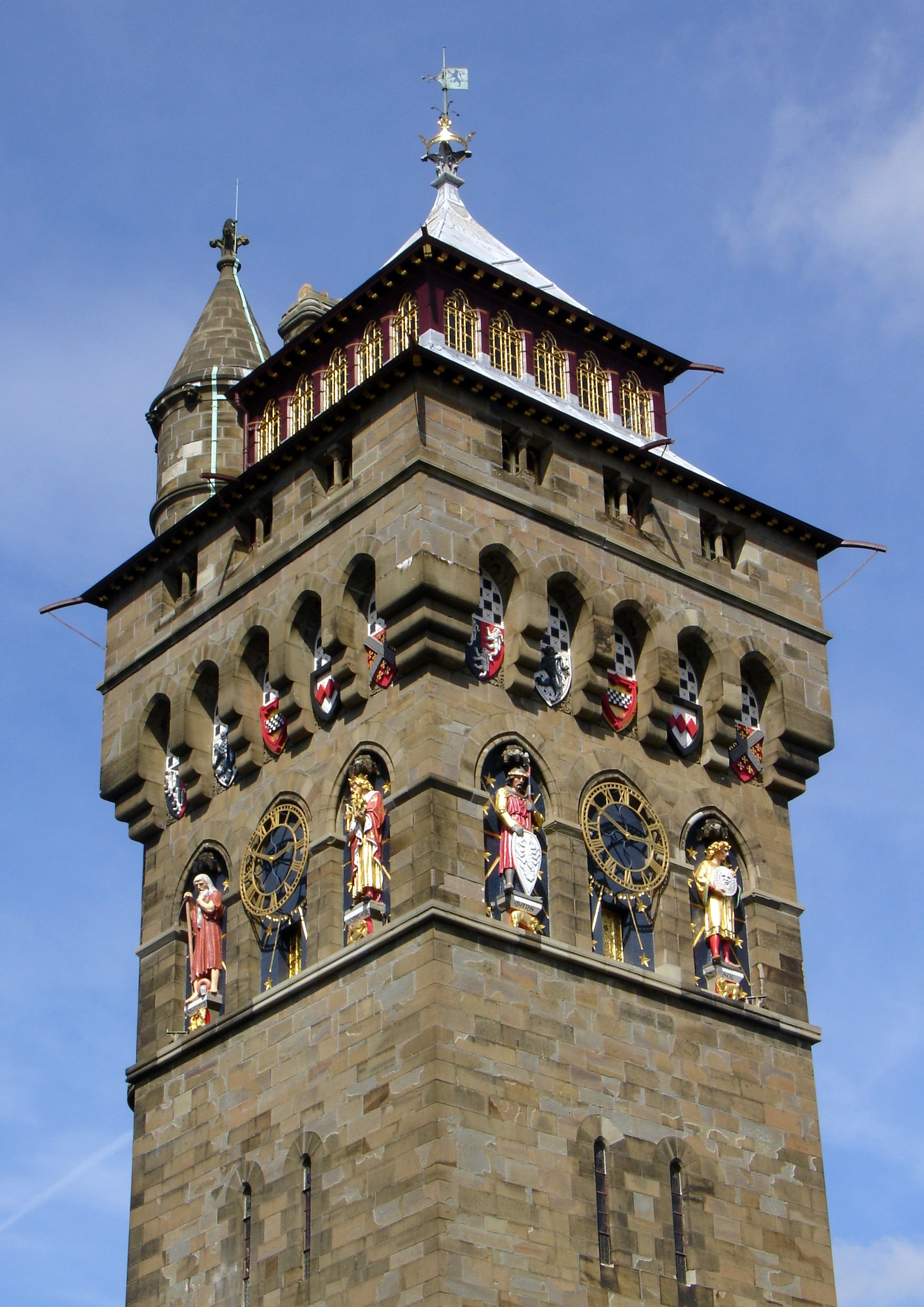
- The Clock Tower of Cardiff Castle

- Location within Cardiff
- Principal area: Cardiff
- Preserved county: Cardiff
- Country: Wales
- Sovereign state: United Kingdom
- Post town: CARDIFF
- Postcode district: CF10
- Dialling code: 029
- Police: South Wales
- Fire: South Wales
- Ambulance: Welsh
- UK Parliament: Cardiff South and Penarth
- Senedd Cymru – Welsh Parliament: Cardiff Central

Castle Quarter (Welsh: Cwr y Castell) is an independent retail destination area in the north of the city centre of Cardiff, Wales. Castle is also a community (parish) of Cardiff.

The listed Castle Quarter includes some of Cardiff's Victorian and Edwardian arcades: Castle Arcade, High Street Arcade and Duke Street Arcade, and principal shopping streets: St Mary Street, High Street, Castle Street and Duke Street.

Development of the area by Cardiff Council began in February 2010 aiming to create the Castle Quarter, particularly High Street and St Mary Street, into a pedestrian friendly environment to enhance the city centre.

== History of the principal streets ==
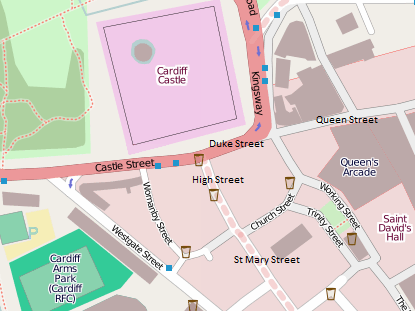
Map of the Castle Quarter

The modern Castle Quarter is generally defined as the part of the city centre closest to Cardiff Castle, including the Castle Arcade, High Street Arcade and Duke Street Arcades, High Street and St Mary Street, Castle Street/Duke Street and Westgate Street.

=== Church Street ===
The original first floor of Truffles tea room was once the residence of John Wesley where he first began his preaching of Methodism.

=== High Street ===
Riots took place during the 16th century between supporters of the rivalling Herberts family, who hailed from the Friary, and the Mathews family of Radyr. Herbert's servants were all arrested in the course of their fighting and how he was able to free them all because his brother was the town sheriff. The street may have been as bustling with activity as much back then as it is today, albeit with a very different kind of activity. There would have been market stalls, but also stocks, whipping posts and there was even a jail house on this street.

At the top end of High Street, before Duke Street and the Castle, used to stand the old Guildhall, demolished in 1860 for the construction of the larger one standing today.

=== Trinity Street/Working Street ===
Trinity Street and Working Street run either side of St John the Baptist Church, over 800 years old and the main parish church for Cardiff. Cardiff's Old Library (1882) is also at the south end of both streets. Cardiff Central Market (1891) faces onto Trinity Street.

=== Victorian and Edwardian arcades ===
| Name | Image | Year opened | Entrances | Notes |
|---|---|---|---|---|
| Castle Arcade | | 1887 | Castle Street; High Street | Castle Arcade opened in 1887 and is a Grade II* Listed building. The Castle arcade, as the name suggests, runs from opposite Cardiff Castle to High Street, north of St Mary St. The arcade hasa variety of small boutique shops as well as cafes and delicatessens, and fair-trade and organic shops. One of the longer of Cardiff's Victorian arcades, Castle Arcade has shops selling, among other things, crystals, air pistols, fancy dress, books and clothes. There are several shops on the gallery level. |
| Duke Street Arcade | | 1902 | Duke Street; High Street Arcade | Duke Street Arcade opened in 1902 is a Grade II Listed building. Duke Street Arcade joins High Street arcade, and is just opposite Cardiff Castle. Duke Street Arcade is lined with stores including hairdressers, bridal shops and Welsh gift shops. |
| High Street Arcade | | 1885 | High Street; St John Street | High Street Arcade opened in 1886 and is a Grade II Listed building. It has entrances on High Street and St John Street. High Street's shops sell designer clothes, jewellery, vintage clothes, children's clothes, toys, gifts and delicatessen foods. |

In 2014 three of the Castle Quarter arcades - Castle, High Street and Duke Street - were bought by investment group Mansford, also for £25 million, with a view to investing in a refurbishment. Nearby properties in High Street and Westgate Street were also added to Mansford's portfolio and independent retailers signed new leases, including tapas restaurant Bar 44, interiors shop Pad Deco and vintage lifestyle shop Annie & Co.

In 2004 the Morgan Arcade and Royal Arcade (towards the southern end of St Mary Street) were purchased by property firm Helical Bar for £25 million, after the Cardiff Arcade Company went into liquidation. Mansford retains ownership of the Wyndham Arcade, which is furthest south.

== Significant buildings ==
=== Cardiff Castle ===
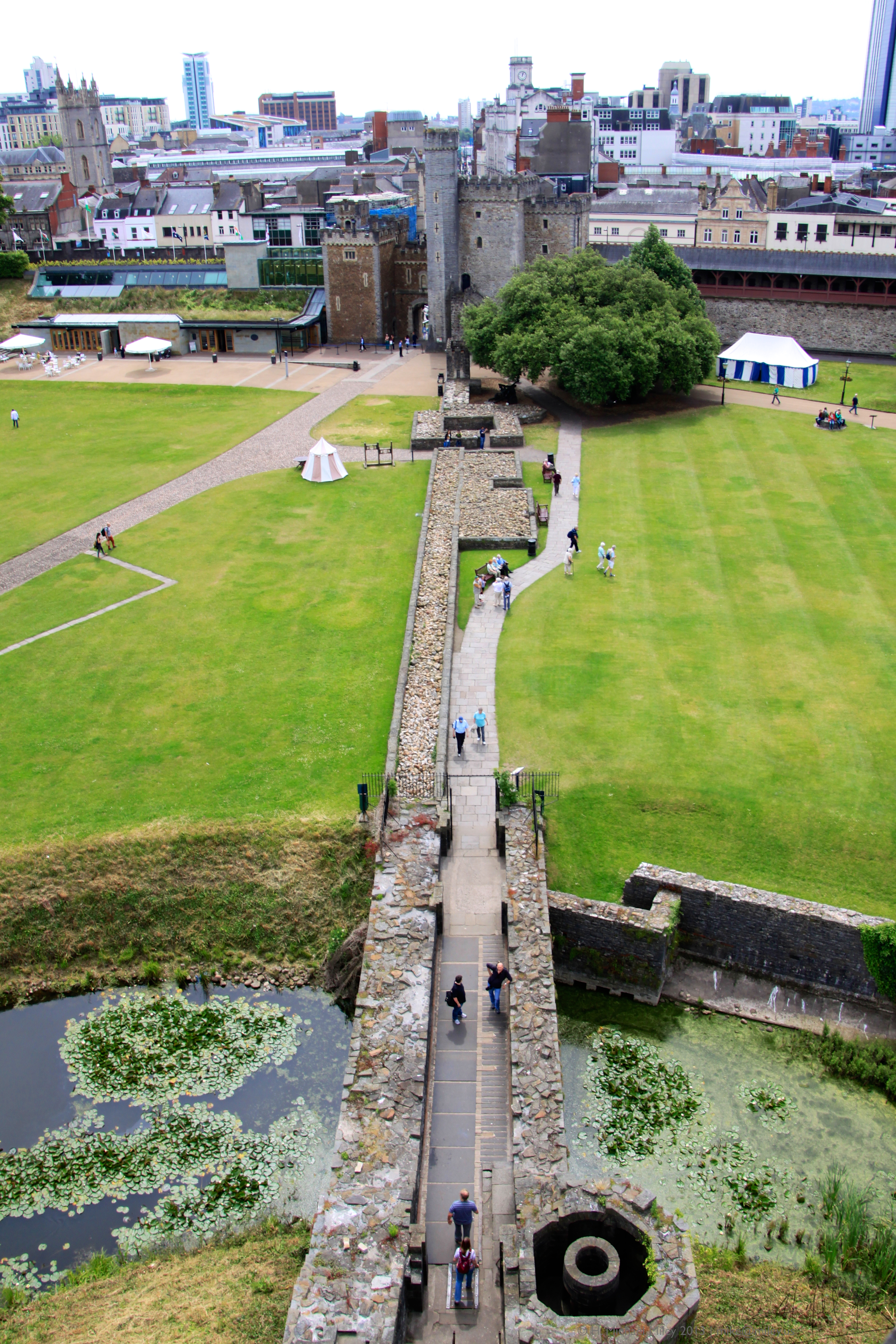
View from the castle's Norman Keep looking towards the gatehouse and Castle Quarter

Cardiff Castle forms the centrepoint of the Castle Quarter and faces onto Castle Street and Duke Street. It is a medieval castle and Victorian architecture Gothic Revival mansion, transformed from a Norman keep erected over a Roman fort.

The Norman keep was built on a high motte on the site of a Roman castra, first uncovered during the third Marquess of Bute's building campaign. The Norman keep, of which the shell remains, was constructed about 1091 by Robert Fitzhamon, lord of Gloucester and conqueror of Glamorgan. In the early 19th century the castle was enlarged and refashioned in an early Gothic Revival style for John Crichton-Stuart, 2nd Marquess of Bute by Henry Holland. But its transformation began in 1868 when John Crichton-Stuart, 3rd Marquess of Bute commissioned William Burges to undertake a massive rebuilding which turned the castle into a 19th century fantasy of a medieval palace, with a series of rooms that, perhaps, constitute the highest achievement of later Victorian Gothic Revival design.

=== Animal Wall ===
The Animal Wall is a sculptured wall depicting 15 animals on Castle Street. It is a Grade I listed structure, designed by architect William Burges in 1866, though not built until 1890. The work was completed by Burges' former assistant William Frame. The original nine animal figures were sculptured by Thomas Nicholls, they were the hyena, wolf, apes, seal, bear, lioness, lynx, and 2 different lions. They were painted in naturalistic colours, although since then the paint work on the sculptures has been removed.

=== St John the Baptist Church ===
St John the Baptist Church, at the junction of Church Street and Trinity Street, was built over 800 years ago and has been renovated and resized over the centuries. Its tower was a gift from the Neville sisters, Anne and Isabel, in 1473. Anne Neville was both Princess of Wales, after her marriage to Edward of Westminster, and later married Richard III to become Queen of England.

Inside the church, two male stone effigies lie side by side to mark the burial place of Sir John Herbert and his brother William, both famous in the area in the 16th and 17th centuries. Sir John, who lies on the right on a red cushion, was known to speak four languages, as he was the English Ambassador to France, Poland, Holland and Denmark and was Chief Secretary to both Elizabeth I and James I.

=== Central Market ===
Cardiff Central Market is a Victorian indoor market on St Mary Street. The market was designed by the Borough Surveyor, William Harpur, and opened in May 1891. A farmers' market is known to have existed at the site since the 18th century.

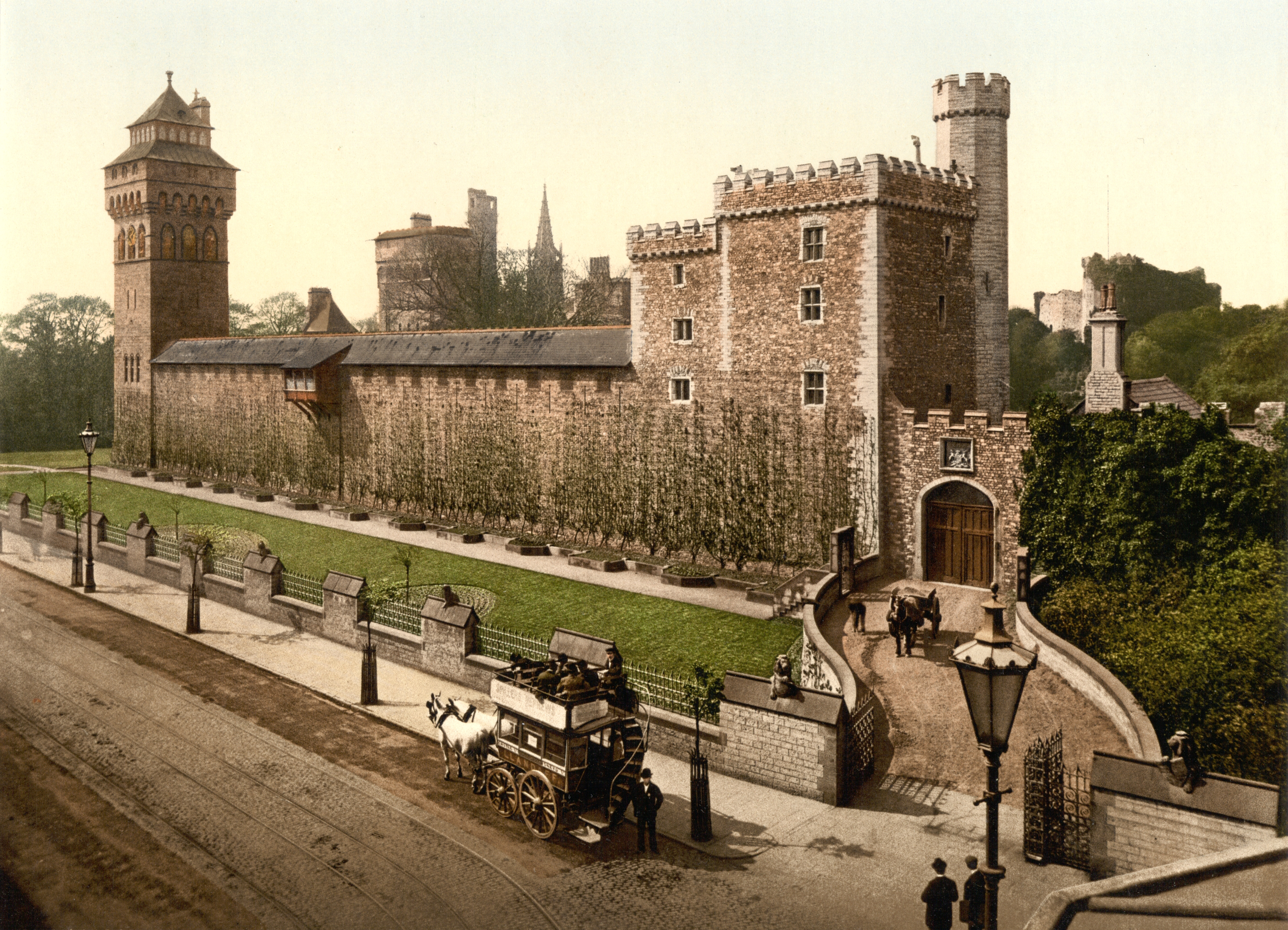
Animal Wall, c. 1890

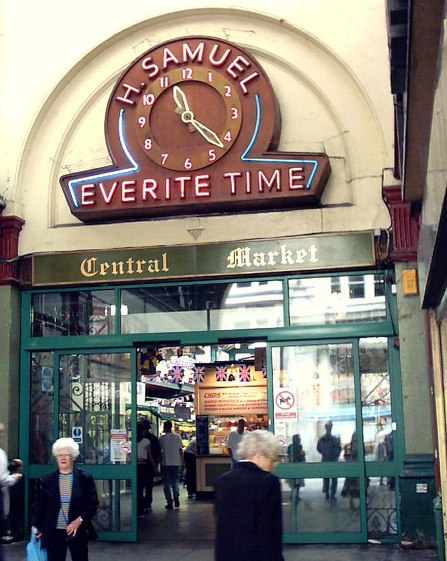
St Mary Street entrance to Central Market

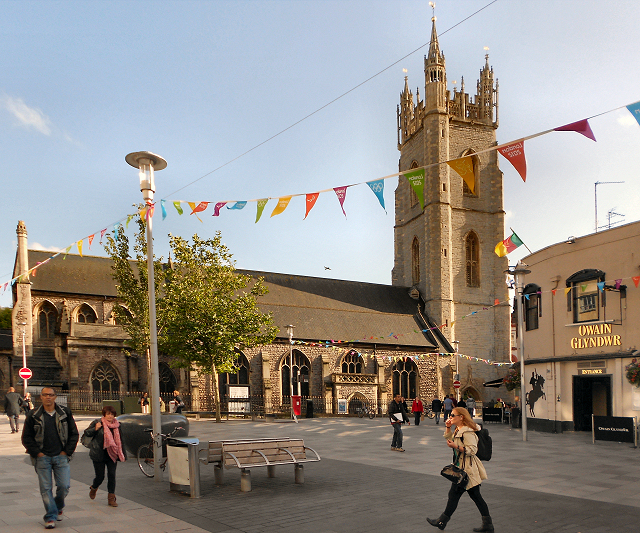
St John's Church in Working Street

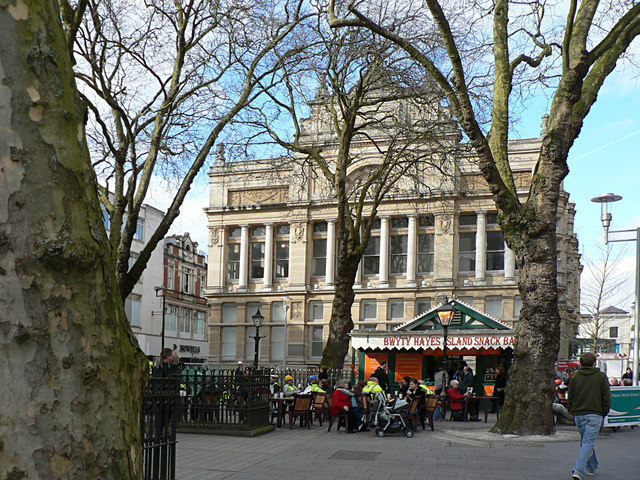
Old Library and Hayes Island, viewed from The Hayes

== Events ==
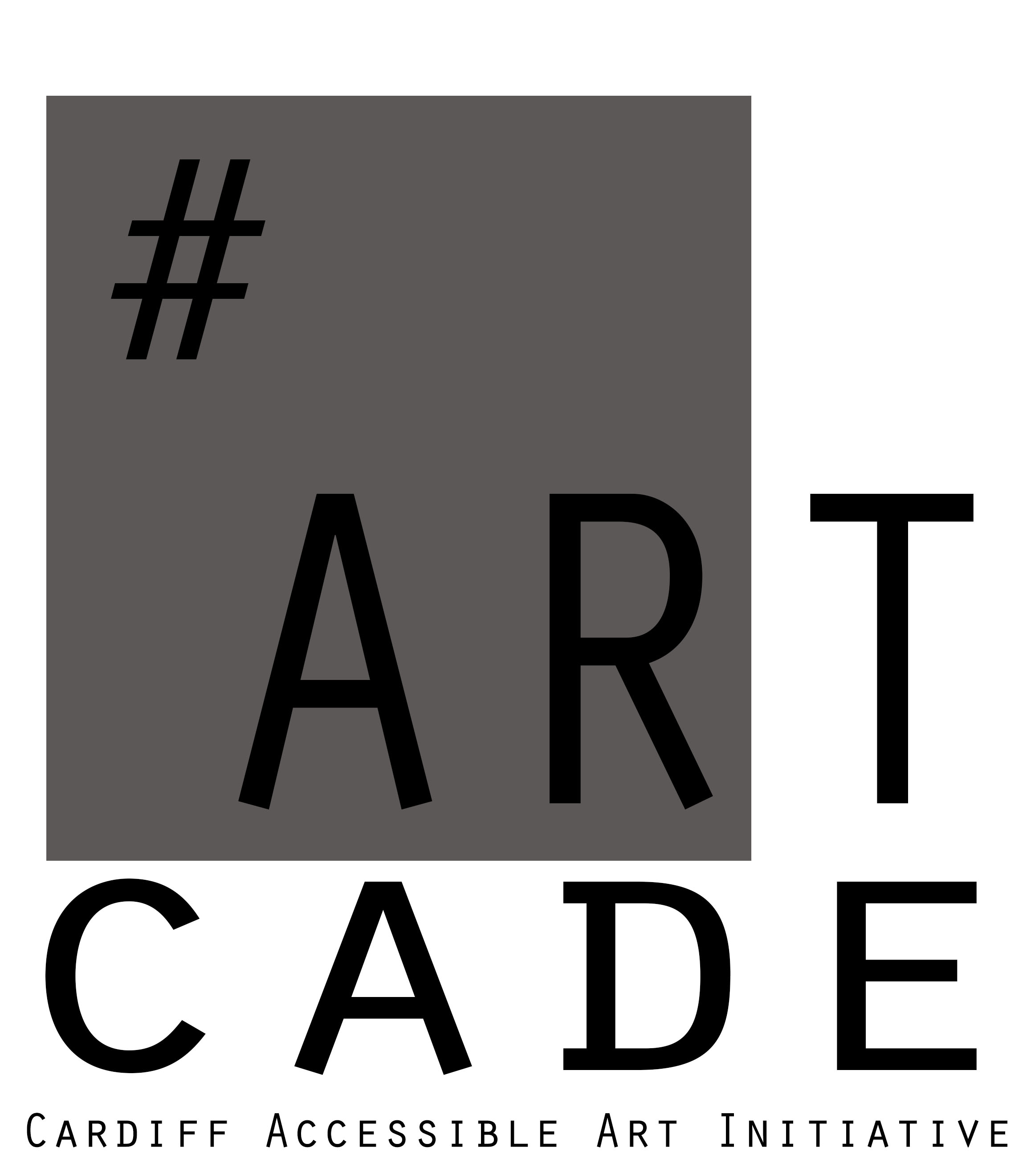
Cardiff Accessible Art Initiative

A Christmas Market takes place in the Castle Quarter. In 2010 the market saw more than 40 stalls open up along High Street, St John's Street and Working Street.

The Castle Quarter also hosts varied pop ups as part of the ARTcade initiative. The events have included exhibitions (Creative Exchange, Engineers of the Imagination), Research and Development Projects (Yellow Back Books), Community Interest Companies (Heads Above The Waves).

== 2010s development ==
Developments outside Cardiff Castle have linked the castle grounds and Bute Park directly to the city centre via a walkway with High Street, aiming to tie the leisure facilities with the business facilities and improve the numbers of shoppers.

The development was part of the £30m Sustainable Travel City project jointly funded by Cardiff Council and the Welsh Assembly Government

=== Construction works ===
The £4 million project to change the street-scape of the city centre commenced in February 2010. Cardiff Council hope to provide an enhanced retail and pedestrian experience for residents, businesses and visitors to the city centre, to reduce traffic, air pollution and noise levels.

Work to pedestrianise St Mary Street and High Street in the city centre began in June/July 2010. Roadworks which took place outside Castle Street have caused traffic problems for motorists and commuters using the busy vein through the city centre. Cardiff Council offered business owners in the area's arcades a £300 reduction on rates as compensation for the disruption. The roadworks ended on 31 October The council was to concentrate on work between Quay Street and Wood Street in order to turn St Mary Street into an area of pedestrian priority.

Guildhall Place was to become one-way, with a taxi rank stationed on the north side. The lower end of Guildhall Place was to be kept two-way to allow access to private car parks.
