= David Morgan (department store) =

Former department store in Cardiff

Coordinates: 51.4792°N 3.1765°W

The logo of David Morgan Ltd

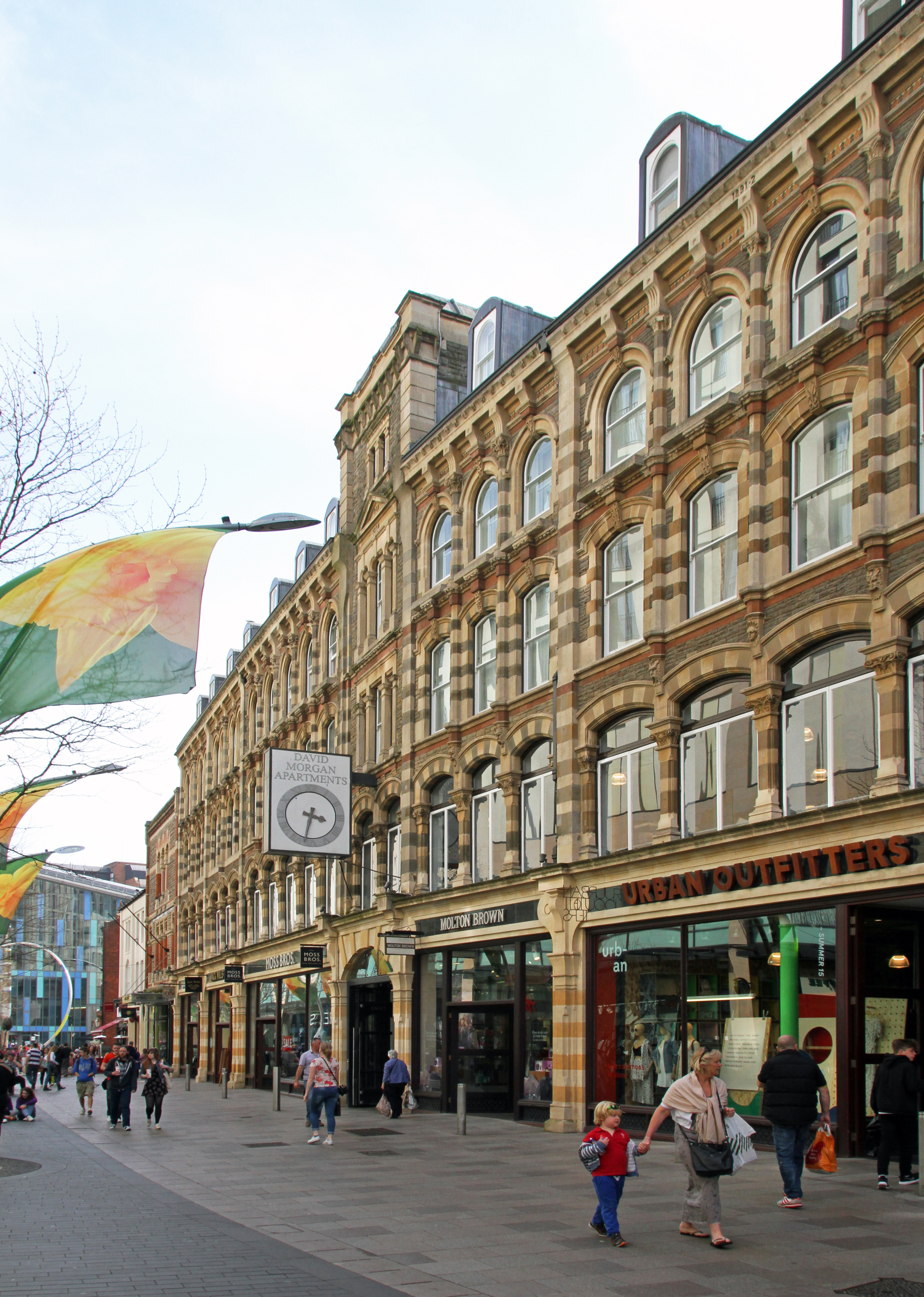
The redeveloped David Morgan department store building

David Morgan was an independent department store in Cardiff that ceased operating in January 2005 after 125 years of trading. It opened on 31 October 1879 and closed its doors for the final time on Saturday 30 January 2005.

== History ==
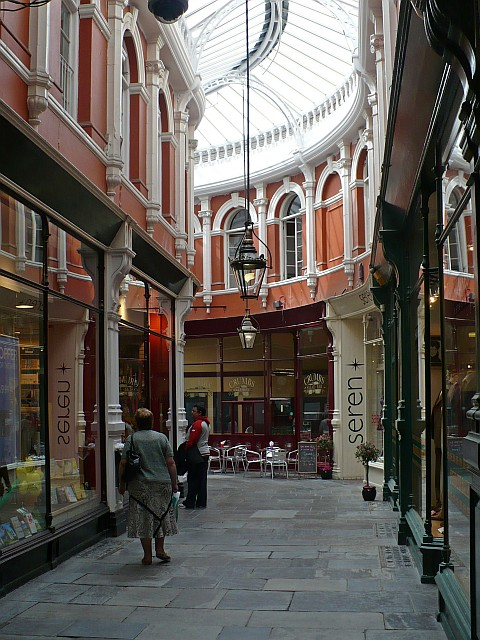
The Morgan Arcade, which still runs under the former department store

The David Morgan department store was founded by David Morgan who was born near Brecon in 1833. He traded in the South Wales valley areas of Abertillery, Monmouthshire and Pontlottyn in the Rhymney Valley for 21 years, before opening a small drapers shop on The Hayes in 1879.

From this small shop the store steadily expanded along The Hayes, to become a six storey department store, rivalling nearby Howells. The David Morgan department store consisted of three buildings; the south building was built by James & Morgan in 1891/2 along with additions made in 1904, the middle building was designed by architect Edwin Seward in 1899 with the north building being built in 1912. In 1896, the company added the Morgan Arcade under the shop, to better connect the various buildings. The company also had a branch in Windsor Road, Penarth, with two shops a few doors apart from each other.

When the store closed in 2005, it was the largest independent department store in Wales. Throughout its time, it was owned and operated by the Morgan family, through the holding company Deymel Investments, and the Cardiff Arcade Company which owned and operated the Royal and Morgan arcades, which run underneath the store. David Morgan Limited, Deymel Investments Limited and the Cardiff Arcade Company Limited are now all in liquidation. The last in the line of family members to run the store were brothers John Morgan (Managing Director) and Richard Morgan (Finance Director).

David Morgan clocks

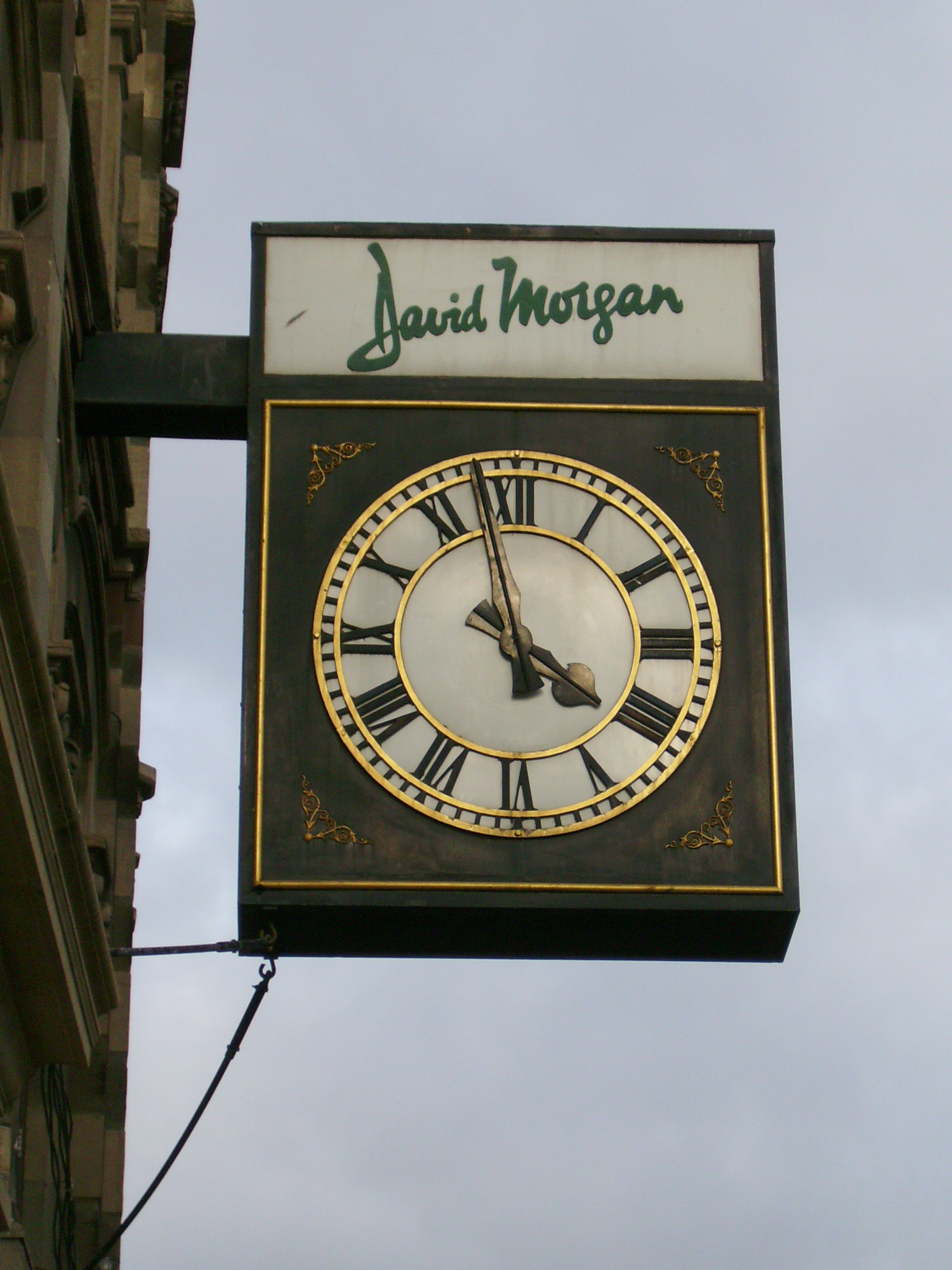
The old David Morgan clock, in use until 2008

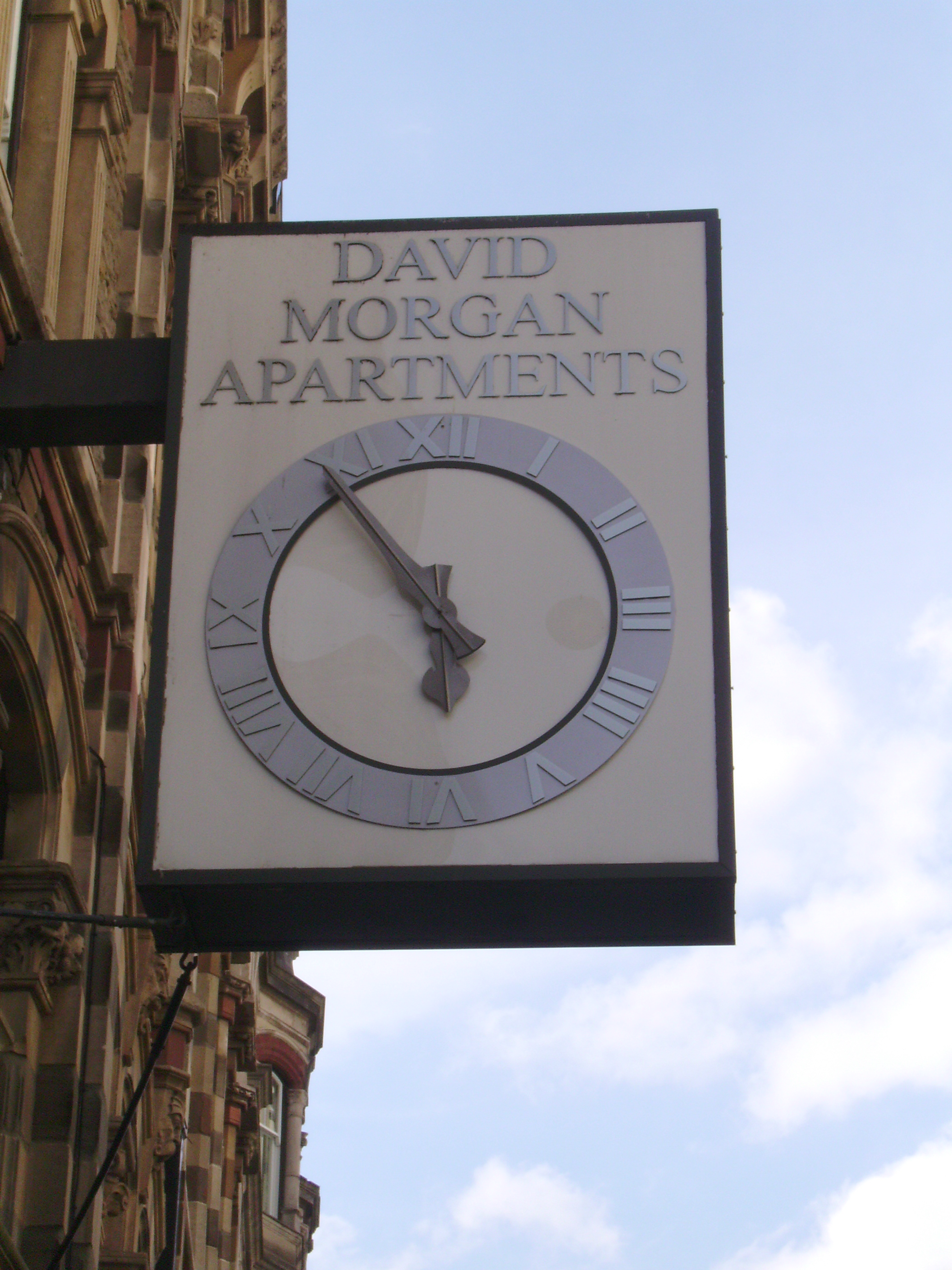
The David Morgan Apartments clock

== Redevelopment ==
The site was sold in late 2004 to Helical Bar plc for £29 million. Between 2007 and 2008 the whole site was refurbished and 65 apartments were built on the floors. New stores include T.K. Maxx, Rossiters of Bath and clothing stores Moss and White Stuff. Borders opened in 2008 however ceased trading in December 2009 following Borders UK entering administration. Luxury apartments, called the David Morgan Apartments, have been built on the upper floors of the six storey store.

Since the opening of St Davids Shopping Centre there has been a greater demand for the stores which were once David Morgan, in particular the stores fronting onto the Hayes.
