= Royal Hotel, Cardiff =

Hotel in Cardiff, Wales

Royal Hotel
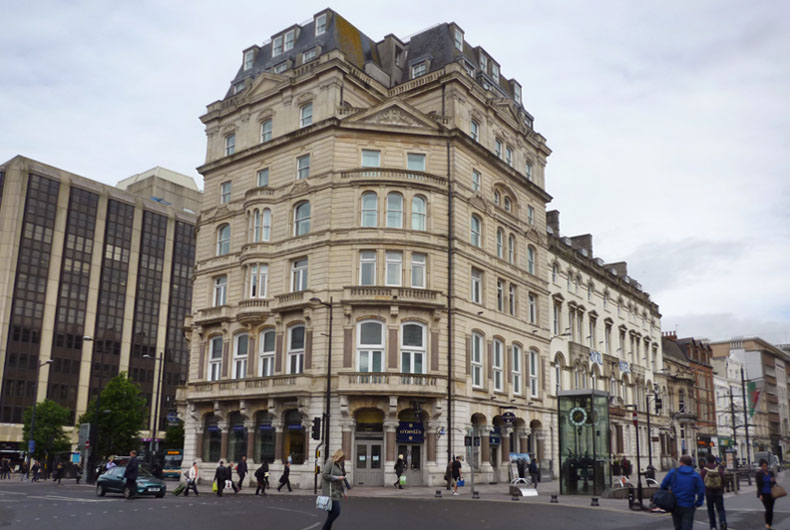
- Royal Hotel, St Mary Street

- Location within Cardiff

General information
- Location: St Mary Street, Cardiff, Wales, United Kingdom
- Coordinates: 51.4780°N 3.1782°W
- Opening: 1866

Website
- Royalhotelcardiff

The Royal Hotel is a Grade II listed hotel on a prominent corner of St Mary Street/Wood Street in the centre of Cardiff, Wales. It is Cardiff's oldest grand hotel.

== History and description ==
The hotel, by C. E. Bernard, was built between 1864 and 1866. An opening dinner was held on 3 July 1866 attended by 60–70 influential local residents. The Royal Hotel was initially run by a Mr and Mrs Sprawson. At the time of its construction there was another Royal Hotel in Cardiff, known as the Old Royal Hotel and located in The Hayes.

The new 1860s building was four storeys high (plus an attic) in an Italianate style. In 1890 an additional storey plus an attic were added to the corner of the building. This increased the number of bedrooms from 70 to 120, with a modern lift and servants rooms on floor six. On the first floor was a banqueting room to seat up to 400 diners.

=== Captain Scott's farewell dinner ===
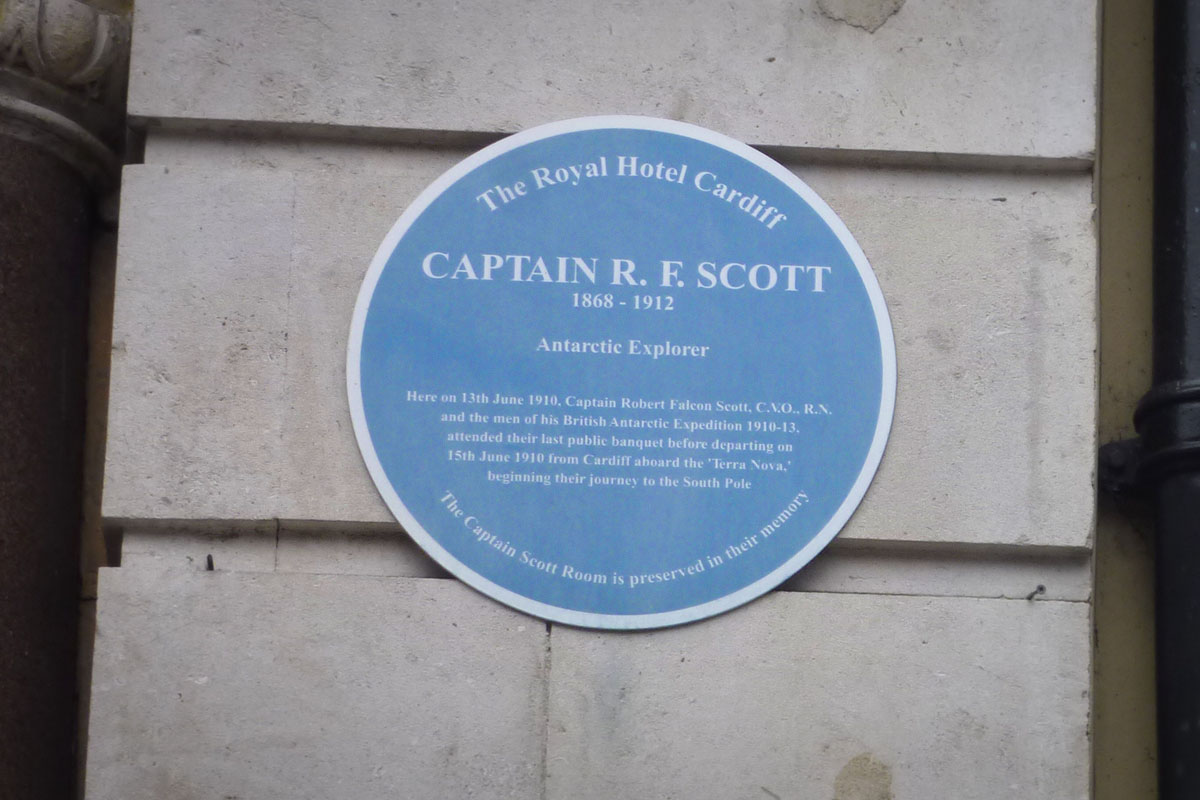
Blue plaque to Captain R F Scott

On 13 June 1910, two days before Robert Falcon Scott's ship departed from Cardiff for his ill-fated expedition to Antarctica, a fundraising dinner for the expedition took place at the Royal Hotel, hosted by Cardiff Chamber of Commerce. A plaque next to the St Mary Street entrance commemorates the event. The first-floor function room in which the event took place (previously called the Alexandra Room) was renamed "The Captain Scott Room" in 1982, after a chance discovery of a menu from the banquet. The Cardiff-based Captain Scott Society was founded in 1983 as a result.

== 21st century ==
The hotel closed in 2001 and underwent a full refurbishment in preparation for the centenary of Scott's farewell banquet in 2011. A new bar was opened, named Fitz's after Pat Fitzgerald, a baby who was abandoned in the lobby of the hotel in 1939 and subsequently adopted by a local steelworker and his wife.

In 2013 a hive of honey bees was installed on the roof of the hotel and given its own room number, 6B. This followed an action plan produced by the Welsh Government to try to halt the decline of the honeybee.

The 2015 edition of the Rough Guide to Wales says of the Royal Hotel "this Victorian building conceals a modern interior; the bold red-and-black furnished rooms and limestone-finished bathrooms are well appointed, if somewhat devoid of charm." It currently offers 60 bedrooms.
