= Cardiff Market =

Victorian indoor market in Wales

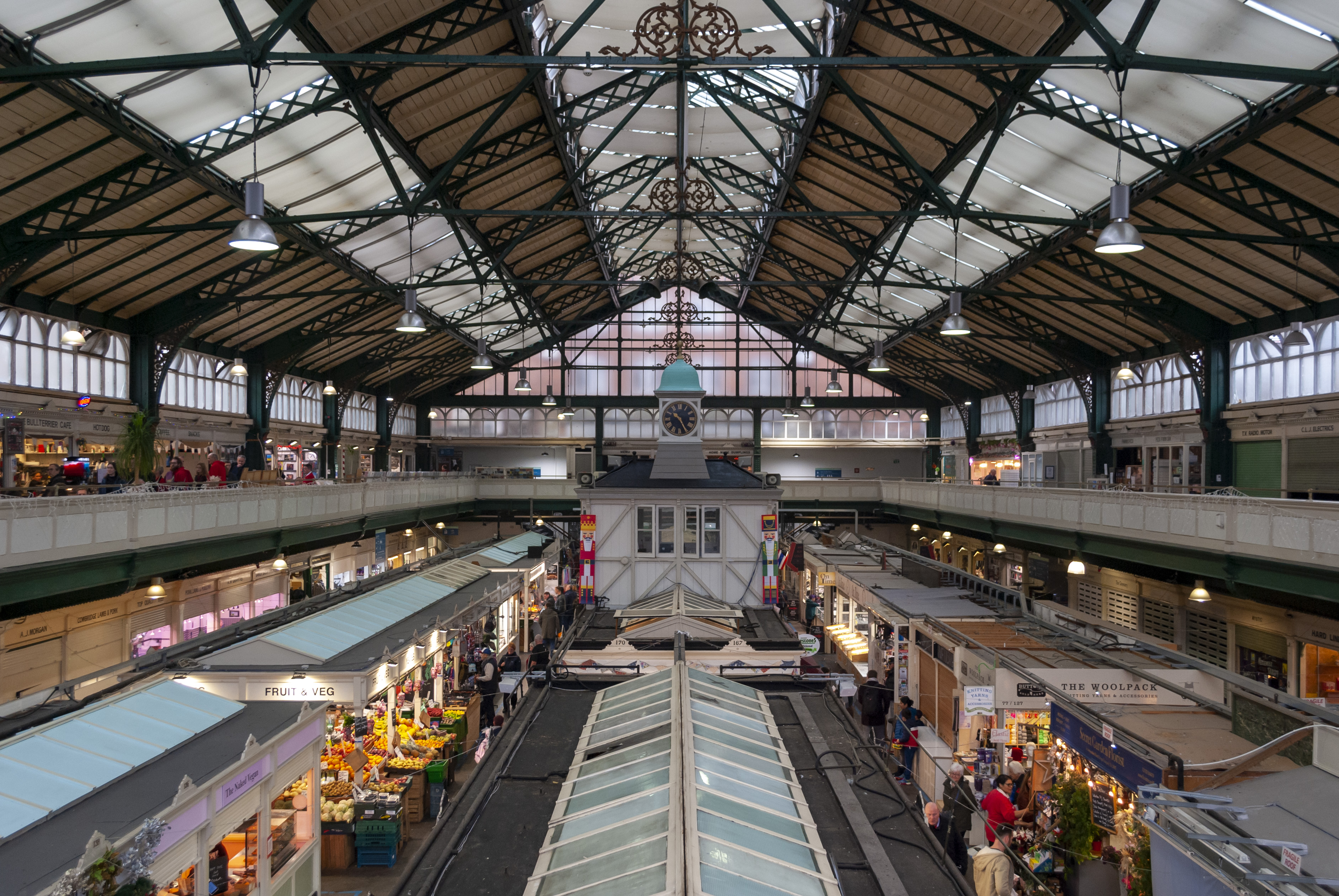
- Inside Cardiff Market from the 1st floor
- Location: Cardiff Market, St Mary Street, Cardiff; Cardiff city centre; 51°28′48″N 3°10′43″W
- Opening date: May 1891; 135 years ago
- Owner: Cardiff Council
- Architect: William Harpur
- Website: cardiff.gov.uk
- Interactive map of Cardiff Market
- Grade II* listed building

Cardiff Market (Welsh: Marchnad Caerdydd), also known as Cardiff Central Market (Welsh: Marchnad Ganolog Caerdydd) and as the Market Building, is a Victorian indoor market in the Castle Quarter of Cardiff city centre, capital city of Wales.

== Background ==
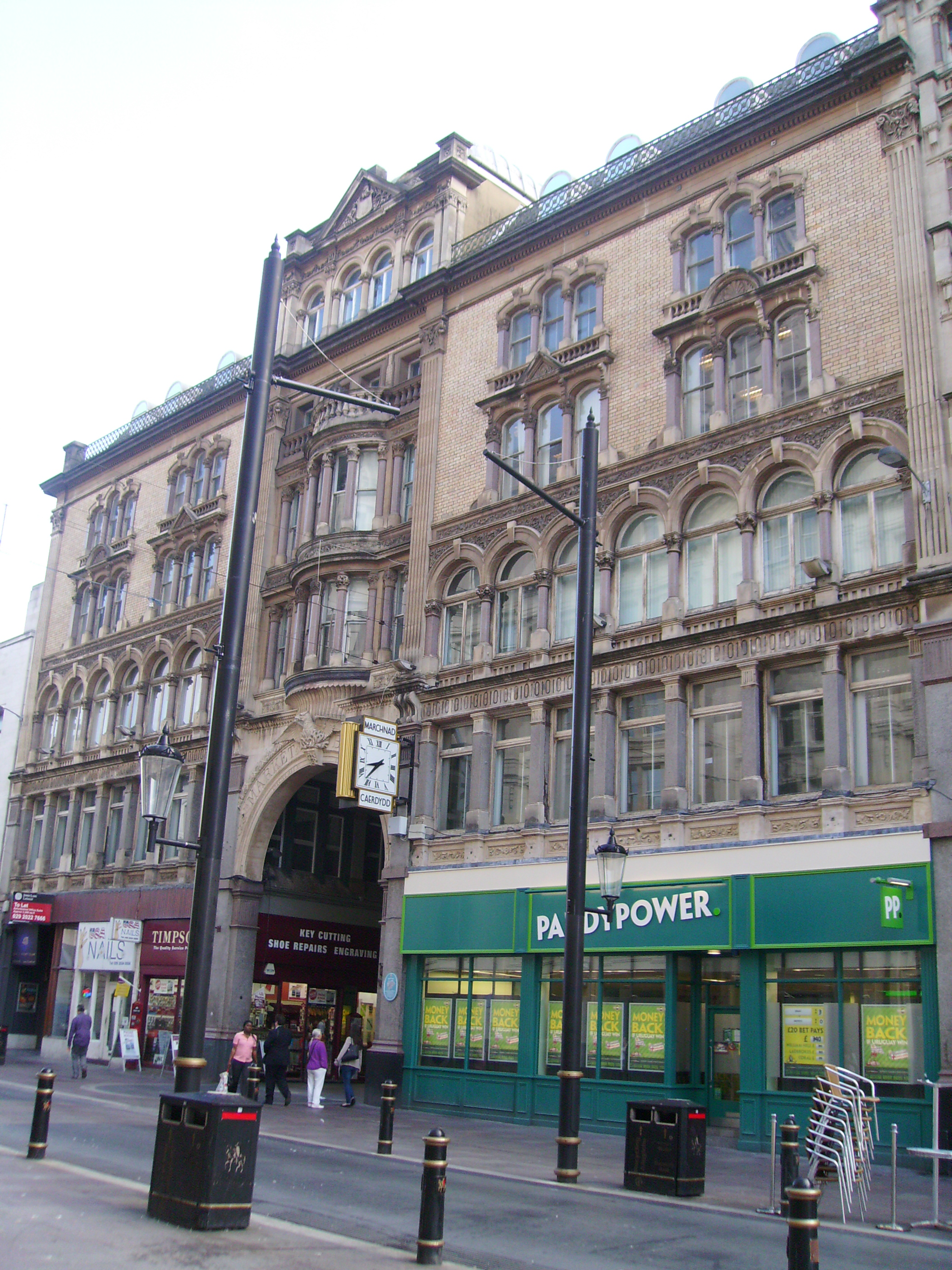
St. Mary Street entrance

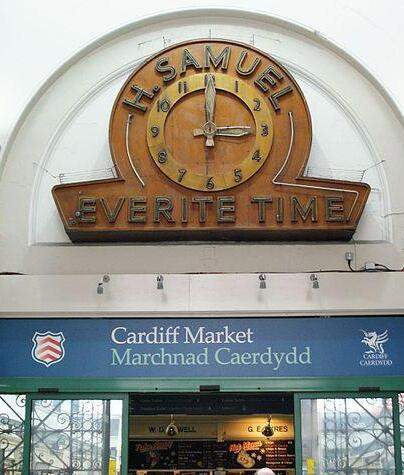
H. Samuel clock over the St. Mary Street entrance

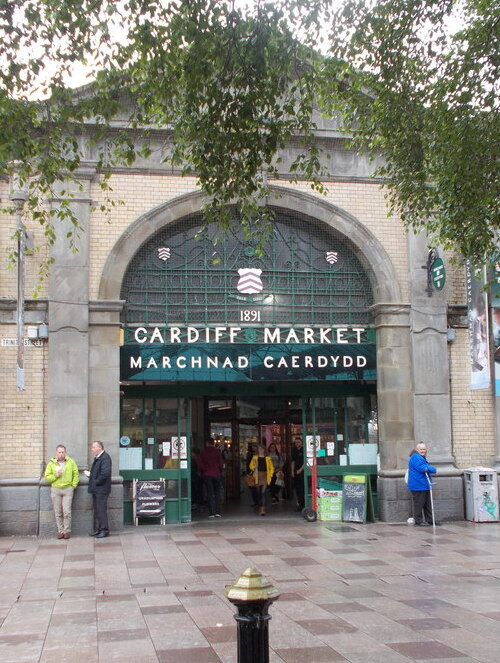
Trinity Street entrance

Originally the site of Cardiff jail, the gallows were located on the site of the current St. Mary Street entrance, where Dic Penderyn was hanged on 13 August 1831.

The market was designed by the Borough Surveyor, William Harpur, and opened in May 1891. A farmers' market is known to have existed at the site since the 18th century.

The market consists of two shopping levels, a ground floor and a balcony level which wraps around the market exterior walls on the interior. Entrances to the market are located at St. Mary Street, Trinity Street and from an alleyway off Church Street.

A large H. Samuel clock has hung above the High Street entrance since 1910. The current clock dates from 1963 (by Smith of Derby) and was restored at a cost of £25,000 in 2011.

Since 1975 the building has been listed and is currently Grade II*.

== Stallholders ==
Stallholders in Cardiff Market

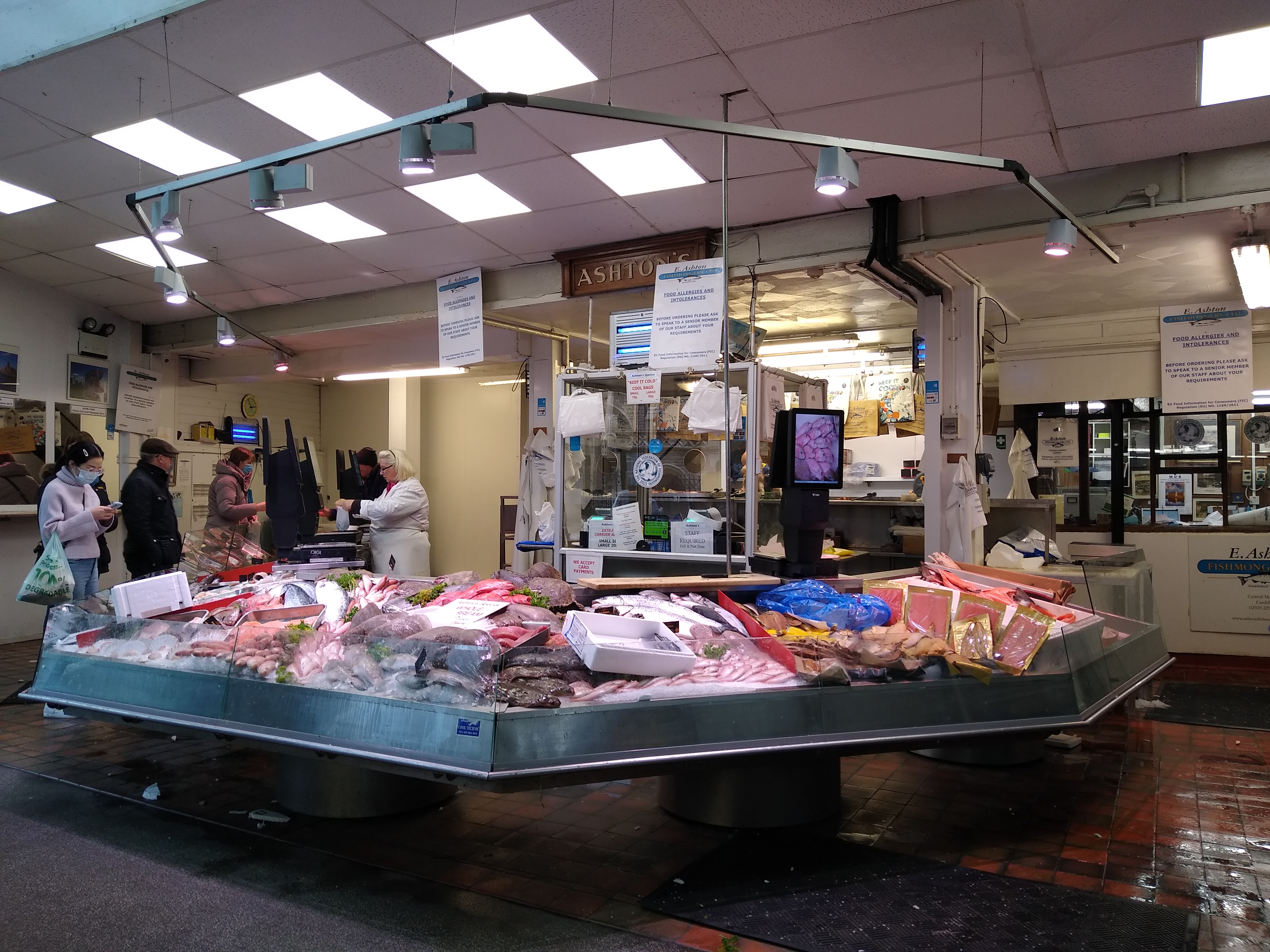
E Ashton Fishmongers in 2022

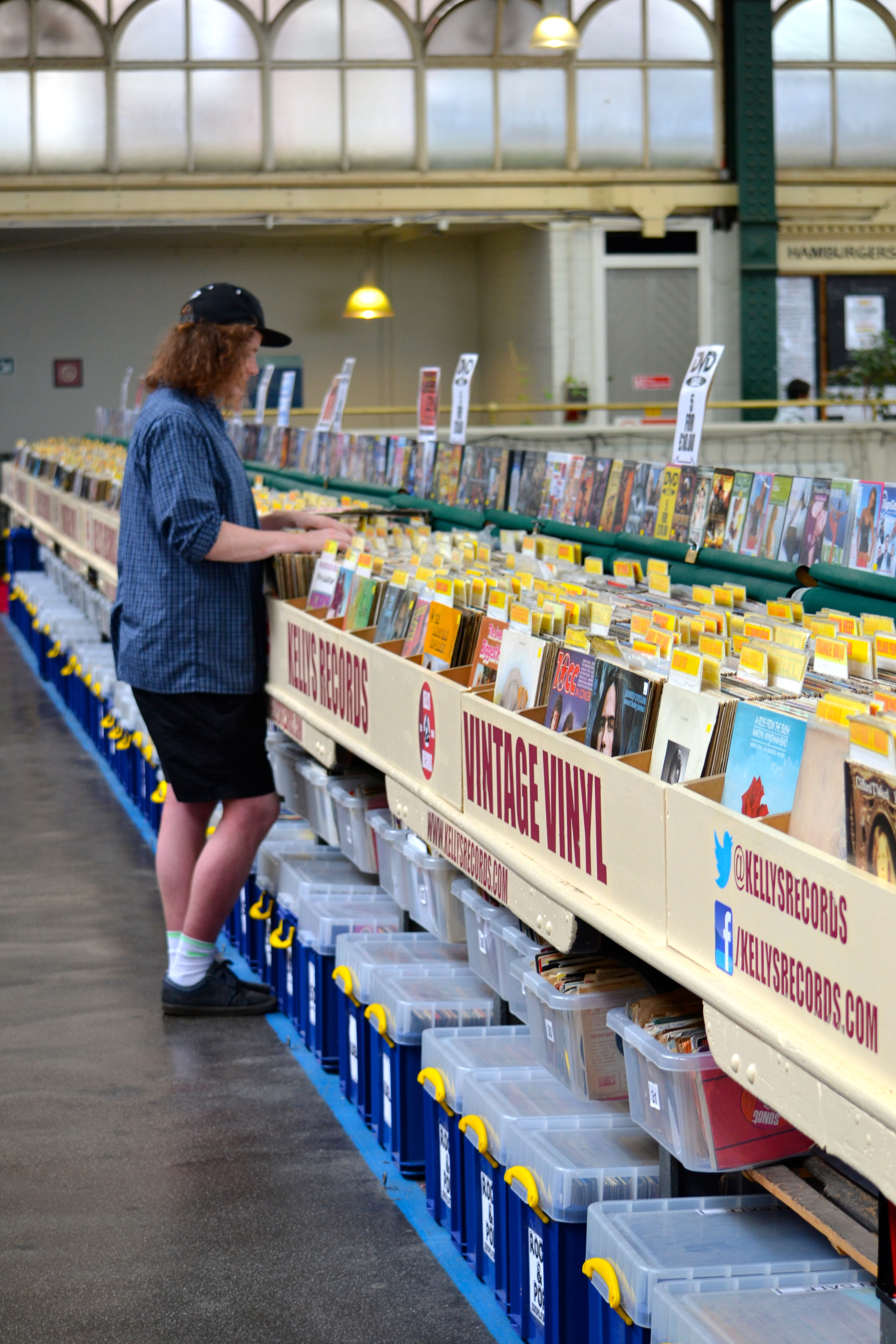
Kellys Records in 2012

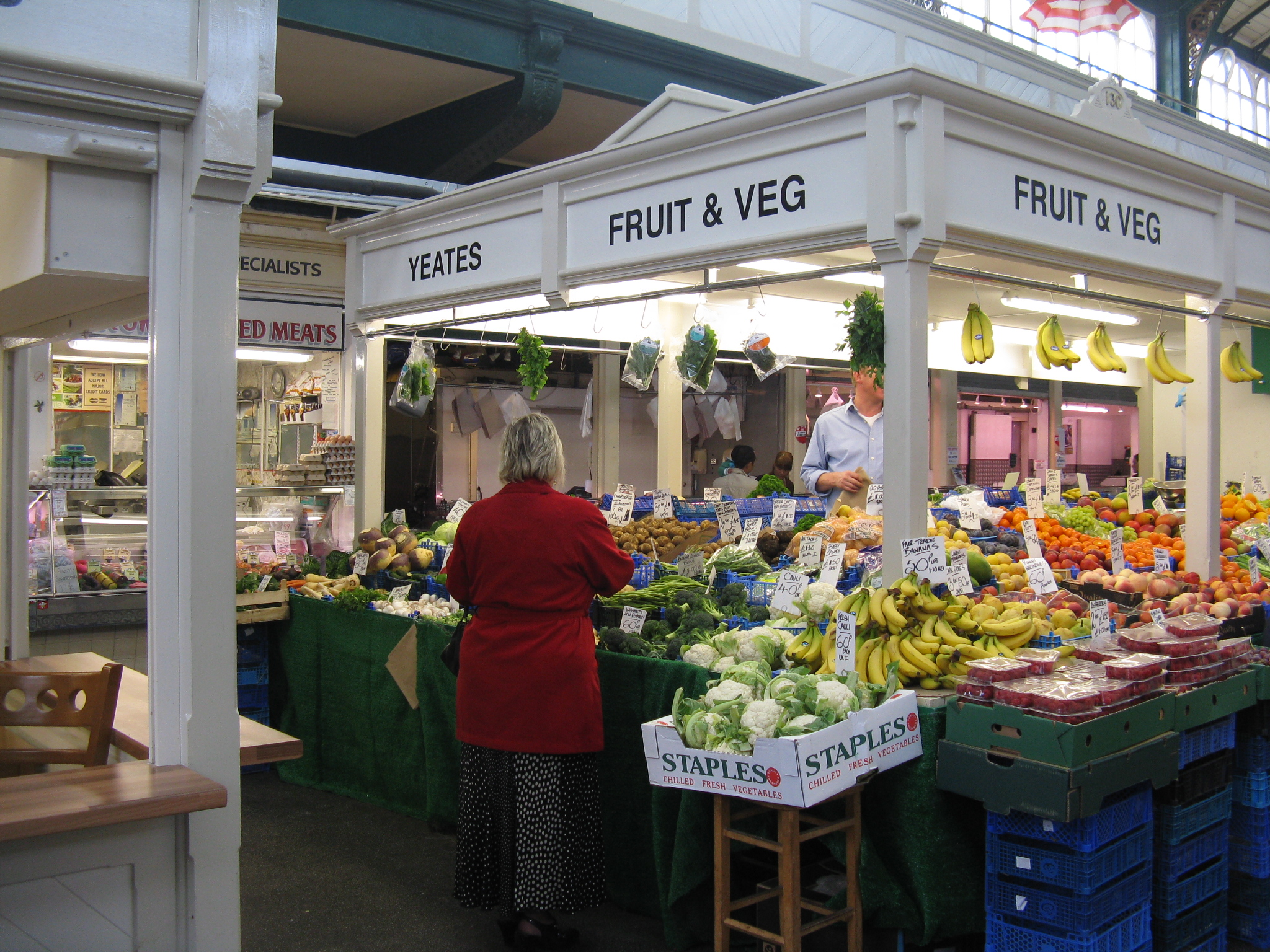
Yeates Fruit and Veg in 2010

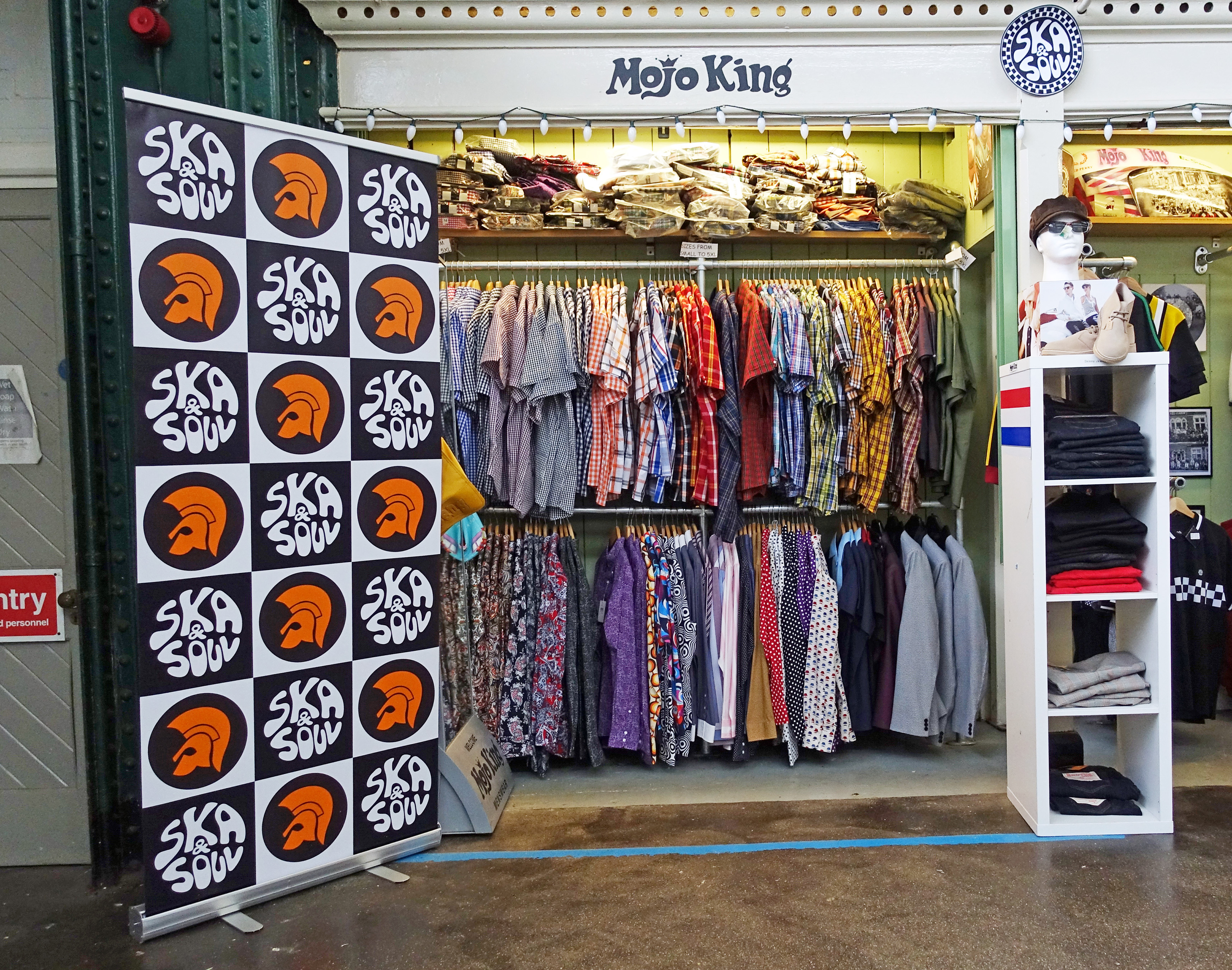
Mojo King Clothing in 2018

The market has 61 independent businesses, including greengrocers, clothing, music, and hardware stalls.

A trader of note is Ashton's the fishmongers, who claim to have traded in the market since 1866 at the Trinity Street entrance selling a wide range of fresh seafood. In 2012 they hit the headlines when they sold meat from a 20 foot long 550 lb thresher shark.

Another longstanding trader is The Market Deli, a small, family-run business trading for over 100 years, located at the same stall since 1928.

== 2024 Renovation ==
An artist's impression of the 2024 renovation

£6.5 million will be spent on renovating the market in 2024. Work is expected to start in the summer of 2024, but the market will remain open throughout the renovation works. Stallholders will be temporarily moved to units in The Hayes, directly outside the market, for up to 12 weeks.

As part of the development, there will be a dining area with 70 seats and the roof and original windows of the Victorian building will be restored. Both the Trinity Street and St Mary Street traditional entrances, the original stalls, the roof and original windows will be restored and improvements made to the Victorian drainage system. Glazing and tiles will be replaced and the H Samuel market clock will be repaired. The market will also get a new activity and education room.

== See also ==
- List of shopping arcades in Cardiff
