= Howells (department store) =

Former department store in Cardiff

Coordinates: 51.480°N 3.178°W

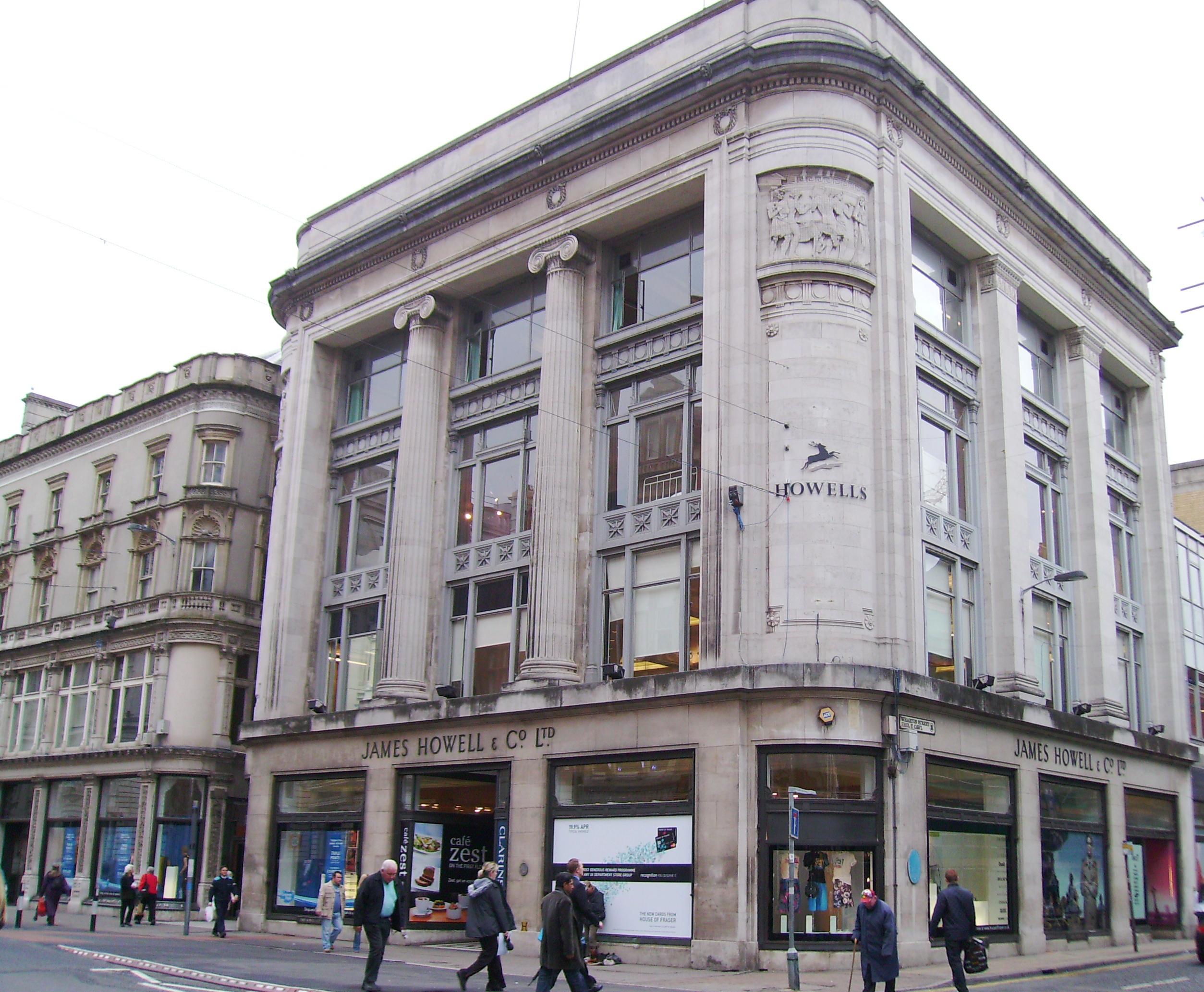
- Howells, at the corner of St Mary Street and Wharton Street (Heol-y-Cawl), in 2008
- Company type: Unit
- Industry: Retailing
- Founded: 1865; 161 years ago
- Defunct: 26 March 2023
- Headquarters: Cardiff, Wales
- Key people: James Howell (founder)
- Owner: Howell family (1865–1960s); Julian Hodge (1960s–1970s); House of Fraser (1972–2022)

Howells was a large department store located on St Mary Street in Cardiff, Wales, established by James Howell in 1865. It was acquired by the House of Fraser group in 1972 and re-branded as House of Fraser in 2010.

In January 2022, the Grade II* listed building was acquired by the Thackeray Group, which announced plans to convert it into an aparthotel. The store closed on 26 March 2023.

== History ==
James Howell was the son of a Pembrokeshire farmer. On 21 October 1865, he opened a shop in the Hayes, Cardiff, in a building called Stuart Hall. In August 1867, the drapery shop moved to St Mary Street. By 1892, he had a shop which extended from Trinity Street in the east to St Mary Street in the west. The first part of the current store was built in the late 19th century and includes an ornate façade on St Mary Street. In the 1920s, a large neoclassical extension was built up to the corner of St Mary Street and Wharton Street. A unique result of this extension was that Bethany Chapel, built on the site of an earlier chapel in 1865, was absorbed into the fabric of the building and its frontage was incorporated into the interior.

Howell's department store was a family-run business, owned and managed by the family of James Howell. After Howell's death in 1909, his 11 children formed a private limited company, James Howell & Co Ltd. Further extensions were added throughout the 1930s, 1950s and 1960s, causing the building to show the architectural trends of the late Victorian era to the Modernism of the 1960s.

The James Howell empire extended across Wharton Street, connected by a bridge, where a car showroom was built (now Cotswold Outdoor Ltd), and a funeral home was also established by the family on the St Mary Street side of the store. Both these businesses were short-lived; the car showroom was bought by rival David Morgan, who extended his store, and the premises of the funeral home became part of the department store.

In 1963, by which time it was owned by a Bournemouth company, Howells was bought for £3 million by the Welsh banker Sir Julian Hodge, who promised that the ownership would never again leave Wales. The store was extensively refurbished. In April 1972, Hodge and the Howells directors sold the shop to the House of Fraser chain, in a deal worth £5 million, meaning the store ceased to be an independent department store (or with Welsh ownership).

While under the ownership of Mohamed Al-Fayed, the House of Fraser chain prompted controversy with its sale of animal fur. In the late 1980s, activists petrol bombed the Howells store, along with the flagship Harrods store and the store's Plymouth branch. The company subsequently sought to resolve the issue with an ethical sourcing policy including not using fur products in its clothing.

The store continued to be a major destination for shoppers, being the second-largest department store in Wales, and even more so after the demise of its long-term rival David Morgan in January 2005. The store had around 150,000-square-foot (14,000 m^{2}) of selling space, making it one of the largest stores in the House of Fraser chain. In late 2009, it underwent a multi-million-pound refurbishment to bring it in line with the new John Lewis store which had opened nearby. The department store itself was also rebranded from "Howells" to the core marque "House of Fraser"; however, due to the store's status as a listed building, the "James Howell & Co." signs remained. In August 2010, banners referring to the store as "Howells" appeared above the main entrances and the House of Fraser signage.

On 7 June 2018, it was announced that the store would close along with 30 other House of Fraser stores. However, on 27 September 2018 the landlord Naissance Capital Real Estate declared they were working with House of Fraser to keep the store open.

The building was then bought by the Thackeray Group in January 2022, with the intention of converting it into a mixed-use scheme. including an aparthotel, restaurants, shops, leisure facilities and offices. The store closed permanently on 26 March 2023.

== The building ==
The building is listed at Grade II*. The twelve northern bays fronting onto St Mary Street date from 1875–1876. The corner block on the corner of St Mary Street and Wharton Street dates from 1928–1930; it was designed by the architect Percy Thomas in the Beaux-Arts style. In the 1990s the Victorian frontage onto St Mary Street, neglected for the best part of 50 years, was cleaned and restored, greatly enhancing the building's appearance.

The large Bethany Particular Baptist Chapel was located behind the Percy Thomas extension, off Wharton Street. The chapel closed in 1965 and Howells was expanded, incorporating the chapel into its structure. The chapel's original features – upper front windows, columns, ceiling arch and a memorial plaque – all remained visible inside the shop. In 2023, the developers announced plans to uncover the façade of the chapel, and create a publicly accessible space around it.

== In the media ==
In 2005, the store was used as a set both inside and outside in the revived BBC series Doctor Who. In the opening episode the store was blown up. The shop was used as the set for Rose Tyler's workplace, "Henrik's". It would return in several other episodes, including the 2023 Christmas episode.
