= Helical plc =

- Company type: Public
- Traded as: LSE: HLCL
- Industry: Real estate
- Founded: 1919
- Headquarters: London, UK
- Key people: Robert Fowlds (Chair); Matthew Bonning-Snook, (Chief Executive)
- Revenue: ▲£33.251 million (2026)
- Operating income: ▼£13.528 million (2026)
- Net income: ▼£5.667 million (2026)
- Number of employees: 25
- Website: www.helical.co.uk

Helical plc (formerly Helical Bar plc) is a Central London development-focused real estate business and a constituent of the FTSE SmallCap Index.

== History ==
The Helical Bar and Engineering Company Limited was incorporated as a limited company on 3 July 1919. After re-focusing on property, the company sold its steel reinforcement business in 1986.

In July 2016, the company name was changed to Helical plc.

== Operations ==
The group is active in London and owns a portfolio with total value of £655.7 million as at 31 March 2026.
