= Culture and recreation in Cardiff =

Overview of the culture and recreation possibilities in Cardiff

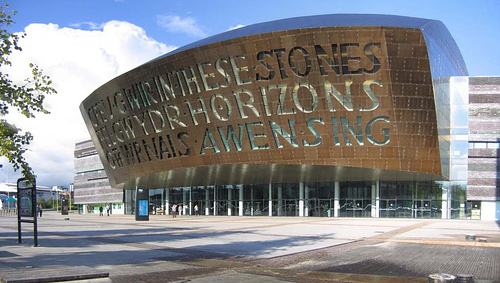
The Wales Millennium Centre, Cardiff, Wales

Cardiff has many cultural sites varying from the historical Cardiff Castle and out of town Castell Coch to the more modern Wales Millennium Centre and Cardiff Bay. Cardiff was a finalist in the European Capital of Culture 2008.

== Language ==
Cardiff has a chequered linguistic history with Welsh, English, Latin, Norse and Anglo-Norman preponderant at different times. Although it was the Romans who established the "castle on the Taff" it was the Vikings who began developing the maritime trade from which Cardiff was to derive its prosperity. The Vikings—who controlled the Bristol Channel—used Cardiff as a raiding base, a port and a trading post. Many street-names in Cardiff are of Viking origin including Dumballs Road and the oldest street in the city, Womanby Street. The conquest of Glamorgan by Robert Fitzhamon brought an influx of Norman-French influence. Welsh was the majority language in Cardiff from the 13th century until the city's explosive growth in the Victorian era. As late as 1850, five of the twelve Anglican churches within the current city boundaries conducted their services exclusively in the Welsh language, while only two worshipped exclusively in English.

A substantial Irish population settled in Cardiff during the 19th century. They were drawn to Cardiff by the work available on major building and engineering projects in the docks and the city itself. The intermingling of the Irish, together with migrants from the West Country, the Midlands and rural Mid Wales is credited with having formed the distinctive flat-vowelled "Cardiff accent" (Roots to Cardiff exhibition, 2007). By 1891, the percentage of Welsh speakers had dropped to 27.9% and only Lisvane, Llanedeyrn and Creigiau remained as majority Welsh-speaking communities. The Welsh language became grouped around a small cluster of chapels and churches, the most notable of which is Tabernacl in the city centre, one of four UK churches chosen to hold official services to commemorate the new millennium. Following the establishment of the city's first Welsh School (Ysgol Gymraeg Bryntaf) in the 1950s, Welsh has slowly regained some ground.

Aided by Welsh-medium education and migration from other parts of Wales, the number of Welsh speakers in Cardiff rose by 14,451 between 1991 and 2001; Welsh is now spoken by 11% of Cardiffians. The highest percentage of Welsh speakers is in Pentyrch, where 15.9% of the population speak the language.

In addition to English and Welsh, the diversity of Cardiff's population (including foreign students) means that a large number of languages are spoken within the city. One study has found that Cardiff has speakers of at least 94 languages, with Somali, Urdu, Bengali and Arabic being the most commonly spoken foreign languages.

== Heritage ==
Cardiff's growth was fueled by its coal and steel industries. The city's maritime heritage is still visible in the revitalized Cardiff Bay area, formerly one of the busiest ports in the world. This history of trade and immigration has made the city incredibly diverse. The community of Tiger Bay was one of the UK's first multicultural neighborhoods, with people from over 50 nationalities living and working there.

The Rawlings White Memorial of Cardiff #803 is a primary lodge of the Orange Order. It is part of the Grand Orange Lodge of England, and its activities are governed by that body. Formed in 2012, the lodge became the first in Cardiff since 1921, and is named after Rawlins White, a Protestant martyr who was burned at the stake in Cardiff in 1555. The Cardiff lodge functions as a fraternal and social society, where meetings are held in a regular basis. Their activities are centered around upholding Protestant and British cultural traditions and providing a community network for members. They participate in orange walks, including the Twelfth of July, remembering the victory of King WIlliam III in the Battle of the Boyne. The lodge participated in the Twelfth in Northern Ireland in 2017 for the first time. They also contribute to local charities and promoting positive evangelism.

== Festivals ==
The Big Weekend Festival is held annually in the city centre during the summer and plays host to free musical performances (from artists such as Ash, Jimmy Cliff, Cerys Matthews, the Fun Loving Criminals, Soul II Soul and The Magic Numbers), fairground rides and cultural events such as a Children's Festival that takes place in the grounds of Cardiff Castle. The annual Cardiff Festival claims to be the UK's largest free outdoor festival, attracting over 250,000 visitors in 2007. Cardiff also hosted Radio 1's Big Weekend in 2003.

Cardiff hosted the National Eisteddfod in 1883, 1899, 1938, 1960, 1978 and 2008. Cardiff is unique in Wales in having two permanent stone circles used by the Gorsedd of Bards during Eisteddfodau. The original circle stands in Gorsedd Gardens in front of the National Museum while its 1978 replacement is situated in Bute Park.

Since 1983, Cardiff has hosted the BBC Cardiff Singer of the World competition, a world-renowned event on the opera calendar which is held every two years. The city also hosts smaller events such as The Cardiff Design Festival, which began showcasing the best of Welsh design during the summer of 2005, and has since grown into a diverse range of designers exhibiting their work. Cardiff also hosts the Sŵn festival, a multiple venue music festival organised by BBC Radio 1 DJ Huw Stevens. The Cardiff Chinese New Year Celebrations, organised by Cardiff Chinese Community Services, are held annually at the Red Dragon Centre in Cardiff Bay.

Cardiff is also home to the Iris Prize Film Festival, the world's largest prize for a gay and lesbian-themed short film. The festival is held in October every year.

Cardiff hosts a number of food festivals including the Bite Food Festival.

== Parks ==
Cardiff is known for its extensive parkland, with parks and other such green spaces covering around 10% of the city's total area. Cardiff's main park, Bute Park (which was formerly the castle grounds) extends northwards from the top of one of Cardiff's main shopping street (Queen Street); when combined with the adjacent Llandaff Fields and Pontcanna Fields to the northwest, it produces a massive open space skirting the River Taff. Other popular parks include Roath Park in the north, donated to the city by the 3rd Marquess of Bute in 1887 and which includes a very popular boating lake; Victoria Park, Cardiff's first official park; and Thompson's Park, formerly home to an aviary, removed in the 1970s.

In 2006, Cardiff won the prestigious Entente Florale award for large cities due to the beauty of its parks and floral displays.

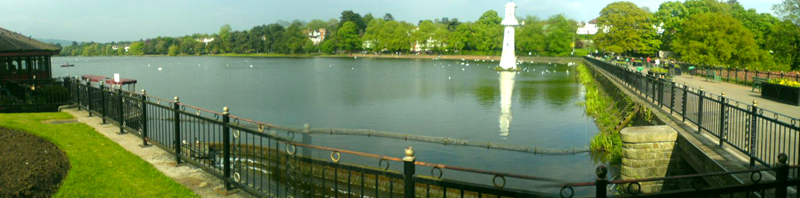
The lake at Roath Park, including the lighthouse erected as a memorial to Captain Robert Falcon Scott

== Music and nightlife ==
The Cardiff music scene is established and wide-ranging. It is the home to the BBC National Orchestra of Wales and Welsh National Opera. It has produced several leading acts itself and, as a capital city, has acted as a springboard for numerous Welsh bands to go and become famous both nationally and internationally. Acts who hail from Cardiff include Charlotte Church, Shirley Bassey, Catatonia, Super Furry Animals, The Oppressed, Kids in Glass Houses, Los Campesinos, The Hot Puppies, The School, We're No Heroes, Budgie, and Shakin' Stevens. Also, performers such as The Automatic, Jem, Funeral for a Friend, Lostprophets, Bullet for My Valentine, Stereophonics and Manic Street Preachers all have links with the city.

Cardiff has a strong nightlife and is home to many bars, pubs and clubs. Most clubs and bars are situated in the city centre, especially St. Mary's Street, and more recently Cardiff Bay has built up a strong night scene, with many modern bars & restaurants. The Brewery Quarter on St. Mary's Street is a recently developed venue for bars and restaurant with a central courtyard. Cardiff has many events going on at all times of the year and is a very fast developing city, particularly with regards to the Bay area. Nightlife throughout the city is a very popular attraction and up to date events can be found on the online Cardiff guide, Events in Cardiff. Cardiff Does experience large volumes of visitors due to the nature of its attractions, such as the Millennium Stadium, which potentially seats thousands and is often host to many international events.

Cardiff's recent redevelopment, including the opening of St. David's 2 shopping centre, has led to a rise in the number of gay venues in the city. These sit alongside the pre-existing venues available. Similar to other major cities Cardiffs gay venues, are mostly focused around one area of the city. This being the area around Charles St and Churchill Way. Cardiff Gay Bars

== Other entertainment ==
Cardiff Bay is the location for many of the city's entertainment venues. The Red Dragon Centre is an entertainment centre featuring a Hollywood Bowl, Grosvenor Casino and an Odeon cinema, with Wales' only IMAX theatre. The centre also houses chain and independent restaurants. The Millennium Plaza centre is a similar venue in the city centre. The Cardiff branch of the global restaurant chain, Hard Rock Cafe, is found on St Mary Street in the city centre.

The main comedy clubs in Cardiff are The Glee Club, in Mermaid Quay, and Jongleurs, in the city centre.

== Shopping ==
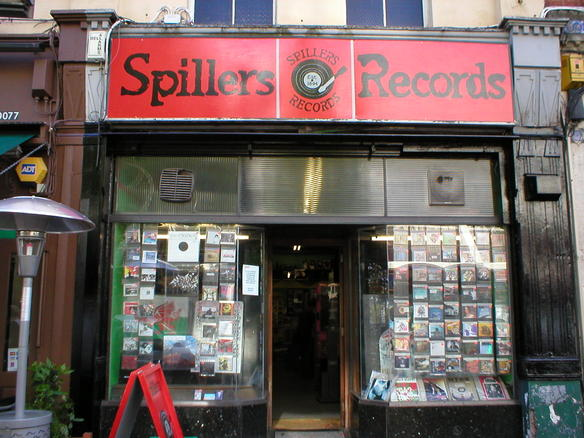
Spillers Records

In 2007 Cardiff was listed as one of the top ten retail destinations in the UK, with three main shopping arcades; St. David's Centre, Queens Arcade and the Capitol Centre. The expansion of St. David's Centre as part of the St. David's 2 project allowed a huge piece of land between The Hayes and Charles Street to be demolished and redeveloped, bringing around 200 shops, flats and a John Lewis department store to the city. As well as these modern shopping arcades, the city is also home to many Victorian shopping centres, such as High Street Arcade, Castle Arcade, Wyndham Arcade, Royal Arcade and Morgan Arcade.

Queen Street is home to the main chain stores such as Topshop, Topman, Boots, Gap, Dorothy Perkins, Primark, and Zara to name a few. St. Mary Street was home to Wales' oldest and largest department store, Howells, until it closed in 2023. Also of note is Spillers Records, the world's oldest record shop.

Cardiff has a number of markets, including the vast Victorian indoor Cardiff Central Market and the newly established Riverside Community Market, which specialises in locally produced organic produce. Several out-of-town retail parks exist, such as Newport Road, Culverhouse Cross, Cardiff Gate and Cardiff Bay.

There have been a number of issues relating to city centre shopping, including the cost of parking in the city centre and the banning of private cars on St Mary Street. Both have been criticised by some sectors of the media, public and retailers.

== See also ==
- List of cultural venues in Cardiff
