= Economy of Cardiff =

As the capital city of Wales, Cardiff is the main engine of growth in the Welsh economy; the city has been developing as a significant service centre and economic driver for the wider south east Wales economy. The city and the adjoining Vale of Glamorgan contribute a disproportionately high share of economic output in Wales. The Cardiff travel to work area has grown significantly since 1991; the 2001-based version includes much of the central South Wales Valleys in addition to the Vale of Glamorgan.

In the 19th century, the economy of Cardiff benefitted most from coal exportation and steel production. Cardiff's port became the world's most important coal port, handling more than London and Liverpool.

Today, Cardiff is a centre for white-collar professions. The city relies principally on the retail, finance, media and tourism sectors, and has been undergoing major regeneration since the late 20th century particularly in Cardiff city centre and Cardiff Bay.

== Economic data ==
=== GDP ===
The economy of Cardiff and adjacent areas makes up nearly 20% of Welsh GDP and 40% of the city's workforce are daily in-commuters from the surrounding south Wales area.

=== Employment ===
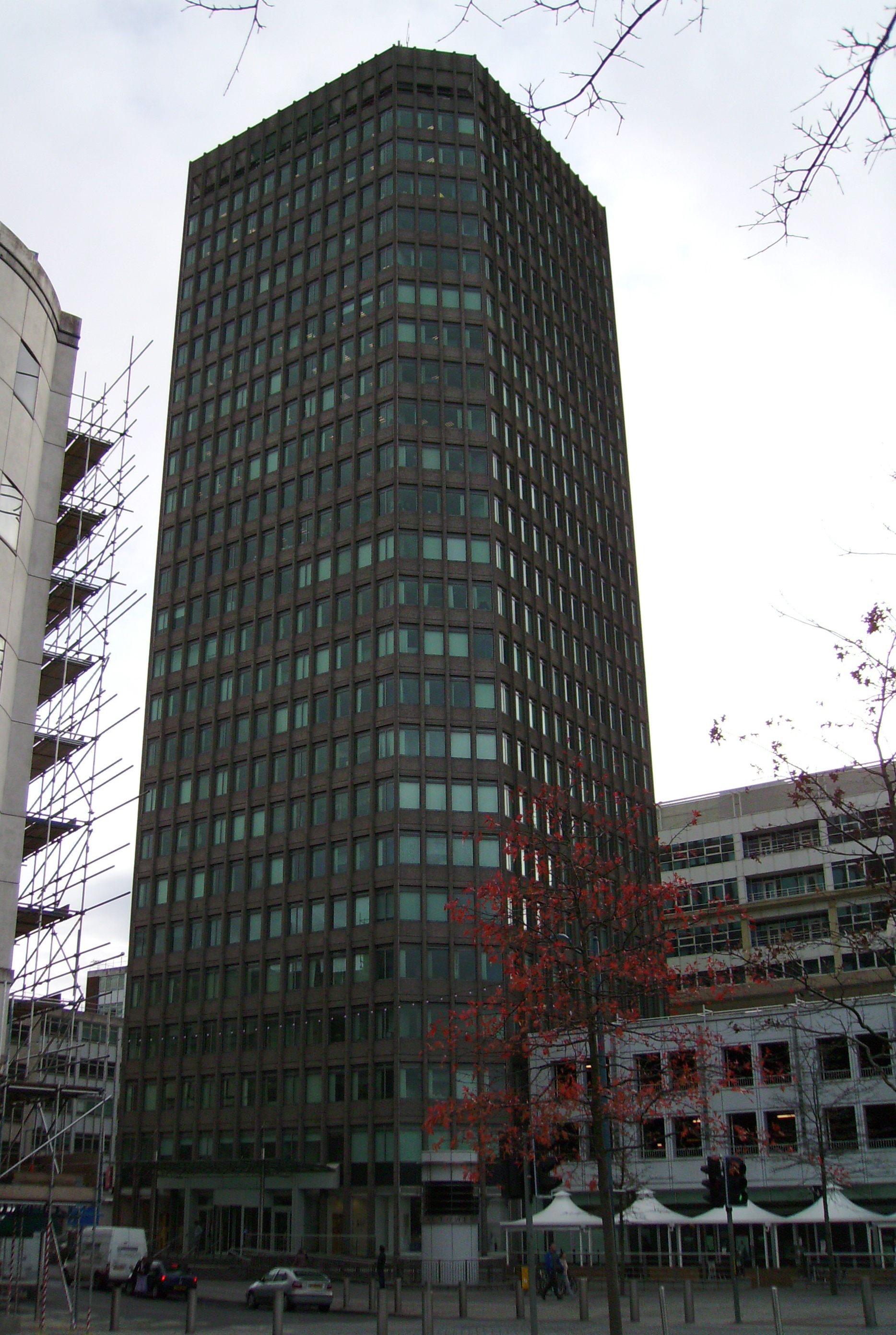
Capital Tower

Total employment in Cardiff stood at 190,948 in 2008, a rise from 149,000 in 1991 to 176,700 in 2005, and has been growing at around 2005 per annum in recent years, almost double the rate across Great Britain (1.3%). In addition, an estimated 18,000 people are self-employed, taking the total workforce to around 194,000. Following the decline of the city's heavy industry in the latter part of the 20th century, the economy of Cardiff is now dominated by the service sector (see table of employment by industry below) with just 9% of employees – 15,650 individuals – engaged in manufacturing activities.

Public administration, education and health is the largest sector in Cardiff, providing employment for 32% of the city's workforce. Cardiff is the main financial and business services centre in Wales and as such, the sector provides employment for 20% of the city's workforce. This sector, combined with the Public Administration, Education and Health sectors, have accounted for around 75% of Cardiff's economic growth since 1991.

20.4% of employees in Cardiff are based in the distribution, hotels and restaurants sector, highlighting the growing retail and tourism industries in the city. A major £675 million regeneration programme for Cardiff's St. David's Centre was carried out between 2006 and 2009 which provides a total of 1,400,000 square feet (130,000 m^{2}) of shopping space, making it one of the largest shopping centres in the United Kingdom.

Cardiff has above average levels of employment in the financial services sector in comparison with Wales and Great Britain as a whole. The city has above average representation in sectors such as financial services, the provision of call centres, TV and film, and the manufacture of pharmaceutical preparations. Employment growth sectors in Cardiff have, to an extent, mirrored national trends, with particularly high levels of growth in construction, distribution, hotels and restaurants, transport and communications, banking, finance and insurance, and public administration, education and health.

=== Unemployment ===
In 2010, the city had an unemployment rate of 4.4% – although this represents a slight increase from the 2.2% recorded in 2004 when it compared favourably with the Wales average of 5.2% and the United Kingdom average of around 8%. In 2010 unemployment in Cardiff was higher than the Wales and UK rates, but lower than in Birmingham, Liverpool, Glasgow and Manchester. Unemployment in Cardiff is concentrated in the southern areas of the city, and is highest in the Butetown ward.

Unemployment has risen considerably in Cardiff. Between 2000 and 2008 the total number of unemployment claimants in Cardiff stood at around 5,000. By 2010 this figure had risen to around 10,000. Claimant rate in Cardiff is significantly higher for men (6.0%) than for the city's female (2.2%) population.

=== Earnings ===
Trend of regional gross value added of Cardiff and the Vale at basic prices 1995 – 2003. (figures in millions of British Pounds Sterling)
Year	Regional GVA	Agriculture	Industry	Services
1995	4,753	11	1,110	3,632
2000	6,584	10	1,302	5,277
2003	8,201	11	1,374	6,816
2005	8,978	11	1,465	7,502
2007	9,432	11	1,565	7,856

Average earnings for workers in Cardiff lead the all Wales average. As of 2009 full-time gross weekly earnings in Cardiff stood at almost £460, compared with almost £490 for the UK, and £440 for Wales. Earnings in Cardiff have grown 45% between 1998 and 2009, more or less mirroring the UK and Wales average trends.

At £483.20, average weekly earnings for residents in Cardiff are relatively close to the UK average of £488.70, and significantly greater than the Welsh average of £444.90. As average residents in the city are earning more than the average worker, this implies that those travelling into the city to work earn less than those who live in Cardiff. Average earnings for residents in Cardiff are higher than many other major UK cities, such as Birmingham, Leeds and Liverpool, although they do still lag the UK average as well as Bristol and Edinburgh.

=== GVA ===
In 2007, Cardiff and the Vale of Glamorgan had a GDP of £9.432 billion GBP. In the same year, Gross Value Added per head was £21,195. This figure is higher than both the Welsh and UK GVA per head at £14,853 and £19,951 respectively, as well as cities including Birmingham, Manchester and Liverpool. Total GVA growth between 1995 and 2007 was 91%.

=== Commuters ===
Out of 197,000 workers in Cardiff in 2008, 126,100 live in the city and 70,900 commute from the surrounding region. 27,100 people who live in Cardiff commute out of the city.

=== Qualifications ===
Overall Cardiff's qualified population consistently outperforms the Wales and UK averages by some distance. This is partly determined by demographics, with Cardiff's relatively young population, and also the existence of a number of universities in the South East Wales region. In 2008, 38.5% of the city's population were qualified with an NVQ4+, compared to 26.5% in Wales and 28.9% in the UK. The proportion of Cardiff's working age population with no qualifications is lower than the Wales and UK averages. 11.1% in the city had no formal qualification, compared to 14.1% in Wales and 12.7% in the UK.

Cardiff is also particularly highly qualified in comparison with other cities in the UK. 32% of its residents have a degree or equivalent. Of the major cities outside London, only Edinburgh and Brighton have a higher proportion of its working age population with a degree or equivalent.

== Industry ==
Since the 19th century, a number of differing industries have shaped the city, and continue to do so today.

=== Coal ===
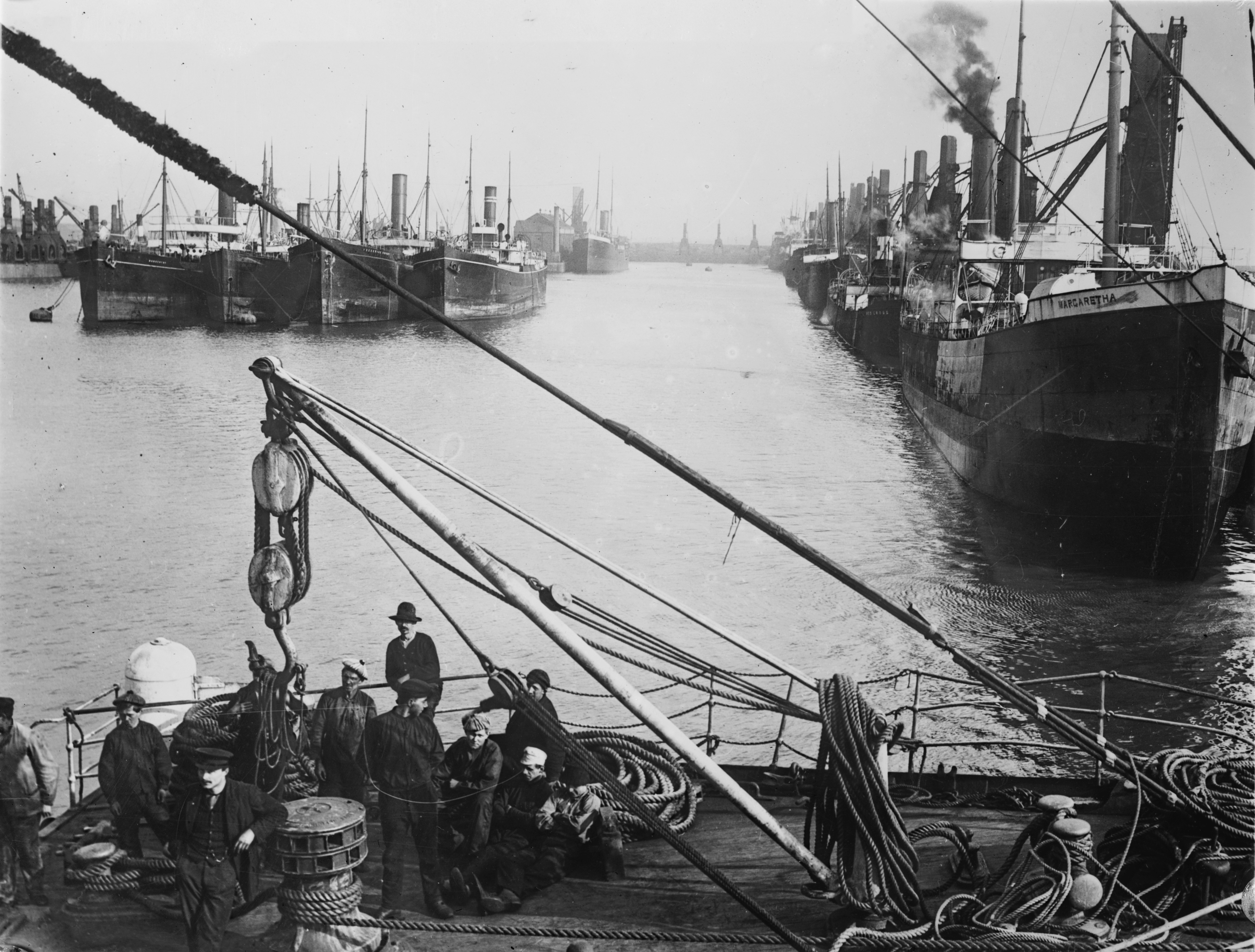
Coal ships in Cardiff docks

What transformed Cardiff into a big city was the demand for coal required in making iron and later steel, brought to the sea by packhorse from Merthyr Tydfil. The Ironmasters, the proprietors of the smelters in Dowlais and Merthyr, wanted to reduce the cost of carrying iron by road to ships berthed in the estuary of the River Taff at Cardiff. They sought permission of Parliament to build a 25-mile (40 km) long canal from Merthyr (510 feet above sea-level) to the Taff Estuary at Cardiff.

Work on building the Glamorganshire Canal began in 1790, took eight years and involved installing 50 locks. The Cardiff Sea Lock, which enabled barges to unload iron into seagoing ships, was built at Harrowby Street (Harrowby – a Viking place-name – had been the original Norse trading post in Cardiff). Eventually the Taff Vale Railway replaced the canal barges and massive marshalling yards sprang up as new docks were developed in Cardiff – all prompted by the soaring worldwide demand for south Wales coal. By 1907 Cardiff's docks had 11 kilometres (6.8 mi) of quayage, one of the largest dock systems in the world at that time.

Cardiff's port, known as Tiger Bay, became – for some time – the world's most important coal port, and for a few years before World War I the tonnage handled at the port outstripped London and Liverpool (however, some statistical tables conflate Barry and Penarth trade figures with Cardiff's, so the role of the coal port can be inflated). In 1907, Cardiff's Coal Exchange was the first host to a business deal for a million pounds Sterling.

Competition from the new docks at Barry from the 1890s, and falling demand for Welsh coal during the interwar period, contributed to the decline of the port. By the 1980s large areas of Cardiff docks were derelict, and a regeneration project that eventually transformed South Cardiff began.

=== Steel ===
The construction of the East Moors Steelworks, known as 'Dowlais by the Sea', established Cardiff as a major steelmaking centre in the 1890s and was the first example of the Welsh industry's move from inland to coastal locations. The plant's main products were steel plates for shipbuilding (though it did not provide the hoped-for stimulus for a local shipbuilding industry) and by the 1930s it was manufacturing half a million tons of steel per year. Although the East Moors works closed in 1978, steel production continues in Cardiff at the Celsa Steel UK plant in Cardiff Bay, which produces reinforcing bars and wire.

=== Retail ===
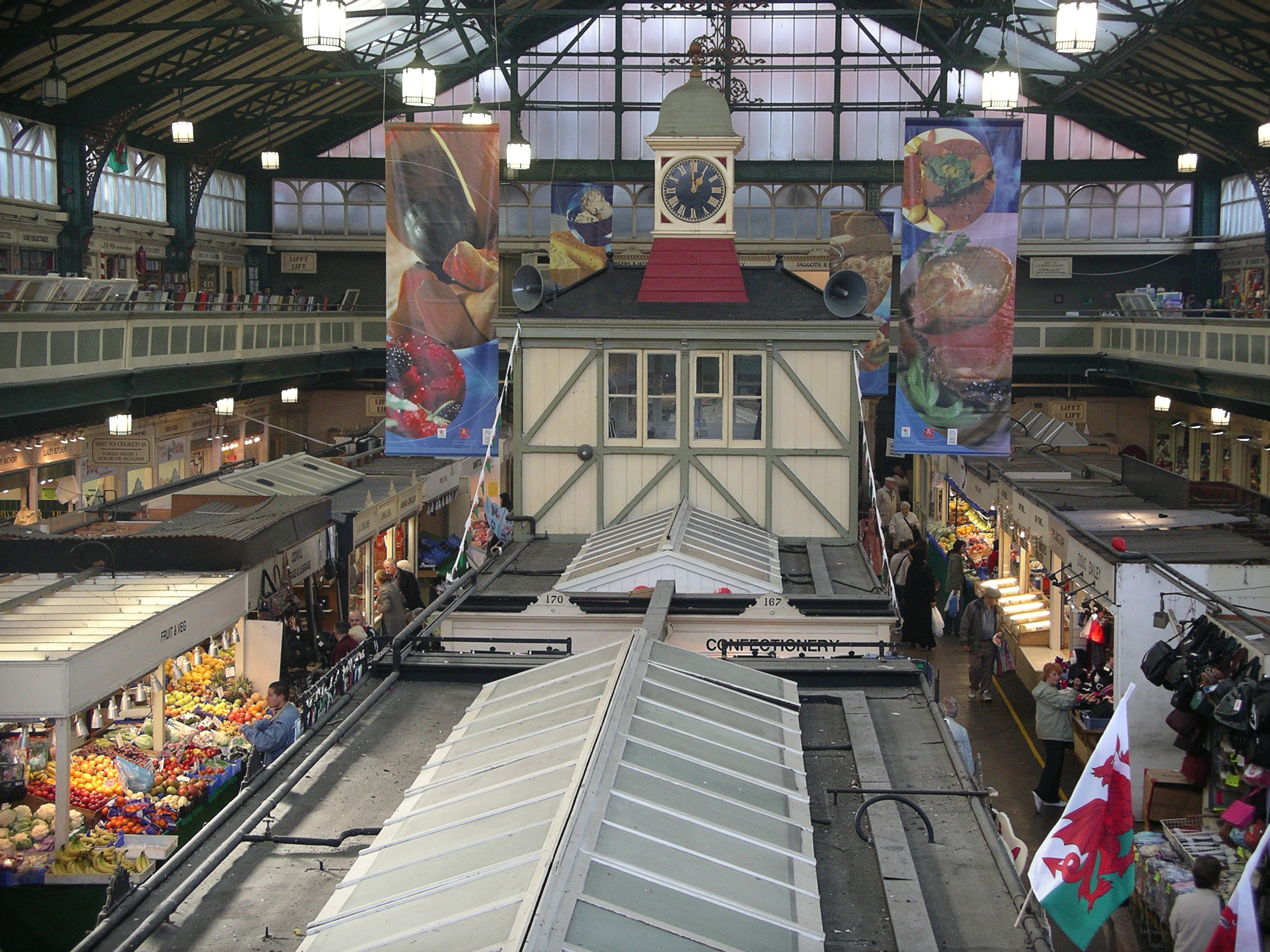
Cardiff Market on St Mary Street in the city centre

Retail also plays a strong role in the city's employment, with it being listed as being the 6th best place to shop in the UK according to recent surveys. The majority of Cardiff's shopping portfolio is in the city centre around Queen Street and St. Mary's Street. There are also numerous suburban retail parks serving the city.

Cardiff retail sector is dominated by three main shopping arcades located in the city centre; St. David's Centre, Queens Arcade and the Capitol Centre. The current expansion of St. David's Centre as part of the St. David's 2 project is allowing a huge piece of land between The Hayes and Charles Street to be demolished and redeveloped, bringing around 200 shops, flats and a John Lewis department store to the city. This will more than double the available floor space, making it one of the largest shopping centres in the United Kingdom. As well as these modern shopping arcades, the city is still home to many Victorian shopping arcades, such as High Street Arcade, Castle Arcade, Wyndham Arcade, Royal Arcade and Morgan Arcade.

There are two main shopping streets in the city centre. Queen Street is home to the main chain stores such as Topshop, Topman, Boots, Gap, Dorothy Perkins, Primark, and Zara to name a few. The second main street, St. Mary Street and High Street, is home to Wales' oldest and largest department store, Howells and is also home to smaller independent stores. Also of note is The Hayes, home to Spillers Records, which was established in 1894 and is officially recognised as the world's oldest record shop. The city is also host to S A Brain, a brewery with premises in Cardiff since 1882. The current brewery is located next to Central Station.

Cardiff has a number of markets: these include the vast Victorian indoor Central Market, Splott Market, Riverside Farmers Market and associated farmers' markets in Roath, Rhiwbina and Llandaff North which all specialise in locally produced and organic produce, and a smaller 'fruit & veg' style St. David's Market on Barrack Lane which will be improved with the coming of St. David's 2. Several out-of-town retail parks also exist, in locations such as Newport Road, Culverhouse Cross, Cardiff Gate and Cardiff Bay.

There have been a number of issues relating to city centre shopping, most recently the cost of parking in the city centre and the experimental banning of private cars on St. Mary's Street. Both have been heavily criticised by some sectors of the media, public and retailers.

Up to one million extra shoppers a month have been coming into the capital since the new phase St. David's opened. Footfall counters have recorded around one million extra visitors per month in early 2010 compared to 2009.

=== Finance ===
Cardiff is thriving as a centre for financial and business services which account for 50,000 jobs in the city. Cardiff is home to a large number of globally recognised financial services companies which have continued to grow during the economic downturn due largely to a competitive business model and a skilled and qualified workforce.

Today, Cardiff is the principal finance and business services centre in Wales, and as such, there is a strong representation of finance and business services in the local economy. In December 2003, 33,850 individuals were employed in the sector – higher than the proportion across both Wales (9.6%) and Great Britain (15.4%). The city was recently placed seventh overall in the top 50 European cities in the FDI 2008 Cities of the Future list published by the fDi magazine, and also ranked seventh in terms of attracting foreign investment.

Legal & General, Admiral Insurance, HBOS, Zurich, ING Direct, Confused.com, The AA, Principality Building Society, 118 118, British Gas, Brains, SWALEC Energy and BT (based in Stadium House) all operate large contact centres in the city, many based in Cardiff's office towers such as Capital Tower and Brunel House. Barclays Partner Finance is headquartered in Pontprennau. Other major employers include NHS Wales and the National Assembly for Wales.

The Cardiff-based Bank of Wales was founded in 1971, but was later taken over by HBOS and the brand name dropped.

=== Media ===
Cardiff is home to the Welsh media and has a large media sector with BBC Wales, S4C and ITV Wales all having studios in the city. Employment in the sector has grown significantly in recent years, and currently provides employment for 2.1% of the city's workforce – higher than the level across Wales (1.1%) and marginally lower than that across Great Britain as a whole (2.2%). BBC Radio Wales and Radio Cymru have their main studios in Cardiff, while both Capital FM and Heart FM also have a studio presence in the city.

A cluster of content driven providers is also flourishing in the city including design, animation, gaming, TV production, film, music, and journalism businesses.

=== Information and Communications Technology ===
Cardiff has experienced significant investment in information and communications technology (ICT) infrastructure in recent years, with the city and wider region being well served by modern communications. Many industries covered by this sector have moved from high volume production to specialist, lower volume, high value-added production. Such research and development activity is anticipated to be the strongest driver of economic growth in the sector. Cardiff is also home to the European Centre of Research and Development.

=== Tourism ===
Cardiff's top tourist attractions (2007)
Attraction	No of Visitors
Wales Millennium Centre	882,962
St Fagans National History Museum	642,289
National Museum	353,079
Cardiff Castle	223,792
Senedd building	204,110
Cardiff Bay Visitor Centre	196,764
Techniquest	178,366

Nationalities of tourists visiting Cardiff (2009)
Country of origin	No of Visitors
France	44,000
Republic of Ireland	36,000
Germany	34,000
United States	26,000
Australia	22,000

Cardiff is one of the most popular tourist destination cities in the United Kingdom, with 14.6 million visitors in 2009, an increase of 50% in 10 years, who spent £703.6 million in the city, an increase of 36% since 2004 In recent years, the city has become a major tourist destination, with recent accolades including being voted the eighth favourite UK city by readers of the Guardian, being listed as one of the top 10 destinations in the UK on the official British tourist board's website Visit Britain, and US travel guide Frommers listing Cardiff as one of 13 top destinations worldwide for 2008.

The large-scale redevelopment of Cardiff at the beginning of the 21st century has turned the city into a far more popular destination for foreign visitors. The most foreign tourists come from France and Republic of Ireland, with Cardiff as the fifth most visited UK city by Australians. According to VisitBritain, "visitors told us that the attraction of Cardiff as a glorious capital city, with an historical resonance, was the reason for visiting".

Cardiff's top attraction is the Wales Millennium Centre, which in 2007 recorded almost 900,000 visitors, ahead of the National Museum, the St Fagans National History Museum and Cardiff Castle. In addition, Cardiff's status as the location of venues such as the Millennium Stadium means that the city receives influxes of anything up to 100,000 visitors during major sporting events such as Six Nations and Rugby World Cup matches.

There are a large number of hotels within the city, most notably the five-star Hilton hotel in the city centre, and St David's Hotel & Spa located in Cardiff Bay. Hotels operated by Copthorne and Marriott are also located in Cardiff, along with numerous smaller hotels, bed and breakfasts and hostels. These are mainly located on St Mary Street, Newport Road and the Taff Embankment opposite the Millennium Stadium. In total, the city's hotels have almost 9,000 available bed spaces.

According to monitoring undertaken by Tourism Development & Visitor Services, 96% of visitors described their visit to Cardiff as either 'enjoyable' or 'very enjoyable' (Cardiff Visitor Survey, 2009). Of visitors surveyed, 94% rated the overall quality of their visit as 'Excellent' or 'Good' with 97% of respondents saying that they would recommend a visit to the city. (Visitor Satisfaction Questionnaire 09/10). The majority (95%) reported that they had been made to feel welcome during their visit to the city. Attractions, in particular Cardiff Bay and Cardiff Castle, along with people and atmosphere were mentioned most frequently as the best thing about a visit to Cardiff. The most popular locations visited/intended to be visited by all visitors were Cardiff Bay (55%), the shops (53%) and Cardiff Castle (51%). For visitors from the UK, Cardiff's shops were most likely to be visited (50%) whilst the priorities for visitors from overseas were Cardiff Castle (80%) and Cardiff Bay (70%).

=== Sciences ===
Cardiff has a cluster of around 100 bioscience related companies and organisations and Cardiff University has an international reputation for research expertise in bioscience related disciplines. Major international companies like GE Healthcare (employing over 1,000 people locally), Shaw Healthcare, Bio Trace and Cogent, complement a small firm sector attracted by the university and the 2,500 local students and 500 doctorates in bioscience related disciplines.

=== Property & development ===
Cardiff is currently enjoying several regeneration projects like the £270 million International Sports Village in Cardiff Bay which played a part in London 2012 Olympics. It features the only Olympic-standard swimming pool in Wales, the Cardiff International Swimming Pool, which opened on 12 January 2008. The sports village also is the site of Ice Arena Wales which houses the Cardiff Devils Ice Hockey team, which play at the highest level of the Elite Ice Hockey League.

The Tiger Bay area also housed one of the UK's earliest non-white immigrant communities. After a long period of neglect, it has now been regenerated as Cardiff Bay – a popular area for culture, entertainment and nightlife. Much of the growth has been thanks to the building of the Cardiff Barrage.

Two large international business parks are planned for the north of Cardiff, the largest being at Thornhill which may include the building of a new junction on the M4 motorway, the other being at junction 33.

The average house price in Cardiff is £181,226, which represents a drop of -0.5% since last year. Cardiff has a strong rental market, particularly in the city centre and Cardiff Bay where house rentals are almost double the national average and the number of total transactions exceeds the total number of properties. According to Zoopla.co.uk the average house price in Cardiff is £188,910, the most expensive post code in Cardiff is CF15 with an average house price of £237,174 which covers suburbs such as Tongwynlais, Radyr and Pentyrch in the North of the city.

House sales in the city rose by 60% in May 2009 in spite of the housing slump and economic recession. House prices are lower than at the peak of the boom but are now rising again.

== See also ==
- Economy of Wales
