= Made in Roath =

Annual arts festival in Cardiff, Wales

Made in Roath is an annual arts festival that takes place every October in Roath, a neighbourhood just adjacent to the city centre of Cardiff, Wales. The event showcases art, music, performance, literature and food in a variety of venues including peoples' homes. It is organised by the tight-knit community in Roath.

Made in Roath first took place as a three-day festival in October 2009, organised by local artists Helen Clifford and Gail Howard. It centred on an open exhibition at The Gate Arts Centre and a curated exhibition in a corner shop.

In 2010 the festival took place on the weekend of 15–17 October. It had grown to include an open house for musicians, poetry readings by the National poet for Wales, Gillian Clarke and a one-man cinema, amongst many other events.

In 2011 Made in Roath expanded the event even further, in partnership with Cardiff Design Festival and Experimentica.

In October 2012 the festival extended beyond the immediate Roath area to include an event in Queens Arcade in Cardiff city centre. Called 'Hand of Roath', poetry and live music were planned, as well as an art installation by artist Sarah Rees.

In October 2015 the event included an open exhibition at the SHO Gallery, work sponsored by the local launderette and pet shop, as well as participation by local churches, shops, cafes and pubs.
