= List of shopping arcades in Cardiff =

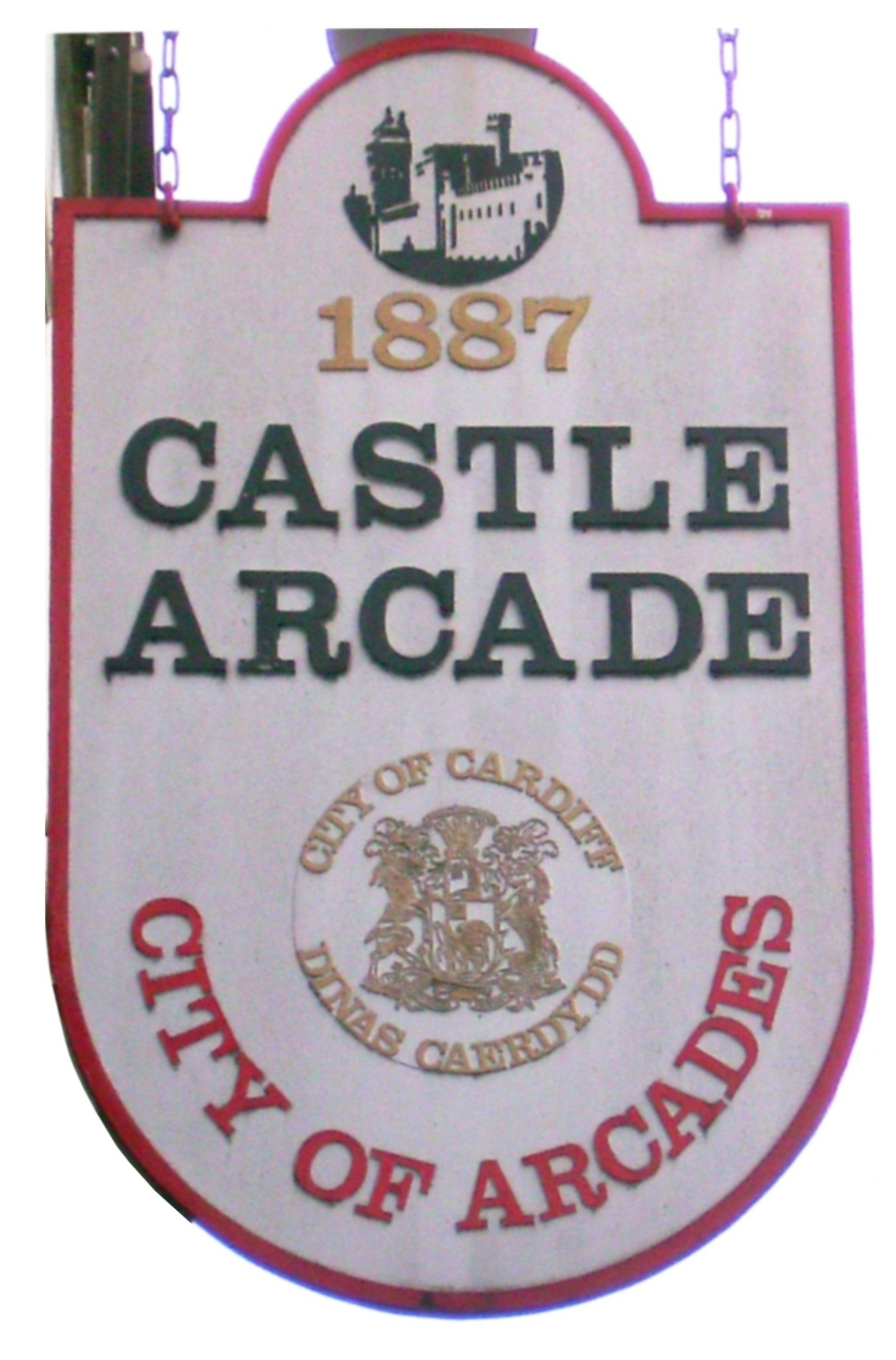
City of Cardiff, city of arcades

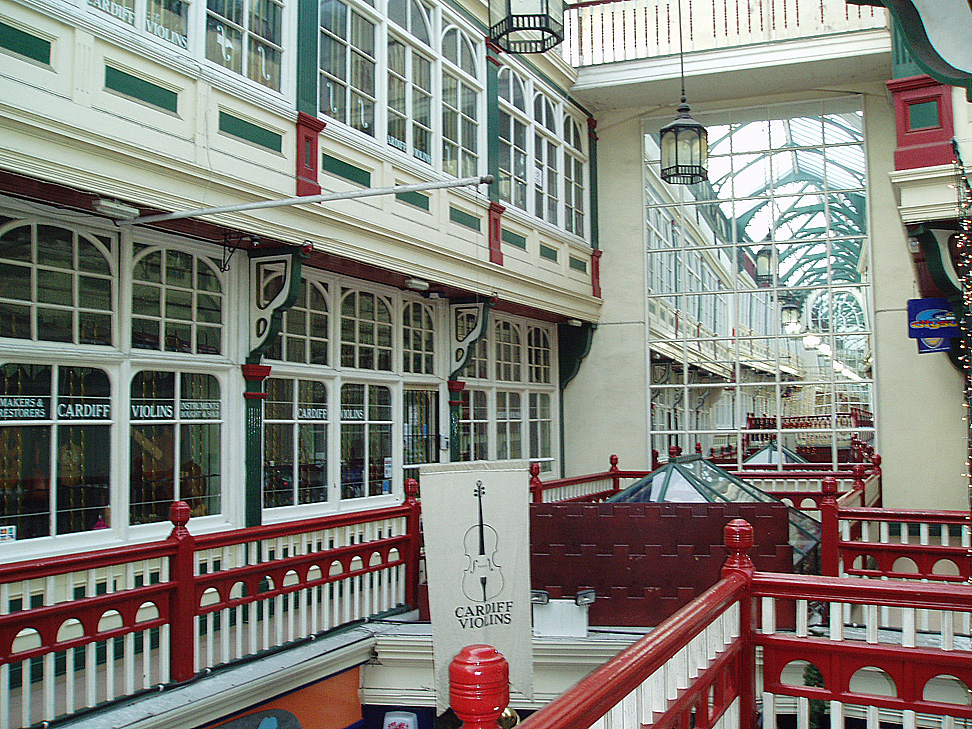
The upper level of Castle Arcade

Shopping arcades in Cardiff include indoor shopping centres and arcades in Cardiff city centre, Wales. Cardiff is known as the "City of Arcades", due to the highest concentration of Victorian, Edwardian and contemporary indoor shopping arcades in any British city.

Up until the 1790s there were only 25 retail shops in Cardiff. Most shopping at that time was made from market stalls. The opening of the Royal Arcade in 1858, which was the first indoor arcade built in Cardiff, significantly increased the number of shops in Cardiff.

Cardiff's Victorian arcades have been attracting new shops and customers since emerging from the economic recession. Existing retailers have expanded which demonstrates resurgence of the capital's unique shopping malls, according to the landlords, Curzon, who is responsible for the High Street, Castle, Duke Street and Wyndham arcades. The area around the arcades will be affected by pedestrianisation of High Street in late 2010, to create the £2.5m Castle Quarter. This is expected to attract more shoppers and tourists to the Victorian arcades.

In 2009 the total length of Cardiff's city centre Victorian and Edwardian arcades was 797 m (2,655 ft).

== Current shopping arcades ==
=== Victorian and Edwardian ===
Name	Image	Year opened	Entrances	Notes
Central Market		1891	St. Mary Street; Trinity Street	Central Market was designed by the county engineer William Harpur. 349 stalls were in the original layout. The market opened in 1891 and has entrances on St. Mary Street and Trinity Street in the Castle Quarter Central Market is a Grade II* Listed building. The market consists of two shopping levels, a ground floor and a balcony level which wraps around the market exterior walls on the interior . There is a large H. Samuel clock above the High Street entrance , which was presumably donated by the H. Samuel jewellery chain, which once had a store just outside the High Street entrance. Traders in the market offer a variety of fresh produce, cooked food, various delicacies and more durable goods. A trader of note is Ashton's the fishmongers, who have traded in the market since 1866 at the Trinity Street entrance selling a wide range of fresh seafood.
Castle Arcade		1887	Castle Street; High Street	Castle Arcade opened in 1887 and is a Grade II* Listed building. The Castle arcade, as the name suggests, runs from opposite Cardiff Castle to High Street, north of St Mary St, in the Castle Quarter. The arcade has a variety of small boutique shops as well as cafes and delicatessens, and fair-trade and organic shops. One of the longer of Cardiff's famous Victorian arcades, Castle Arcade is home to a variety of shops selling, among other things, crystals, air pistols, fancy dress, books and clothes. There are several shops on the gallery level.
Dominions Arcade		1921	Queen Street; Crockherberton Lane	
Duke Street Arcade		1902	Duke Street; High Street Arcade	Duke Street Arcade opened in 1902 is a Grade II Listed building. Duke Street Arcade joins High Street arcade, and is just opposite Cardiff Castle, in the Castle Quarter. Duke Street Arcade is lined with stores including hairdressers, bridal shops and Welsh gift shops.
High Street Arcade		1885	High Street; St John Street	High Street Arcade opened in 1886 and is a Grade II Listed building. It has entrances on High Street and St John Street in the Castle Quarter. High Street arcade is known for its range of fashion stores which include designer clothes, individual fashions, jewellery and vintage clothes as well as one of the oldest surf and skateboarding shops in Wales, City Surf. One will also find children's clothes and toys, gifts and a New York Deli in the arcade.
Morgan Arcade		1896	St. Mary Street; The Hayes	Morgan Arcade opened in 1896 and is a Grade II Listed building. Morgan Arcade is the considered best preserved of Cardiff's arcades, with first-floor Venetian windows and original slender wooden storefronts. It has entrances on St. Mary Street and The Hayes. It has shops such as The Plan, which specialises in organic and Fair Trade food. Neals yard, next door, sells organic herbal skin care and body care products, also Spillers Records, which claims to be the oldest Record Shop worldwide, dating from 1894.
Royal Arcade		1858	St. Mary Street; The Hayes	The Royal Arcade is the oldest arcade in the city, having been built in 1858. It is a Grade II Listed building. Royal Arcade still has some of the original shopfronts at numbers 29, 30 and 32 St. Mary Street. Running from The Hayes through to St Mary Street, towards the south of the city centre, adjacent to the New St David's 2 development, independent shops are found such as Wally's Delicatessen, who have been in the arcade for 50 years, and those specialising in Welsh textiles, gifts and homeware.
Wyndham Arcade		1887	St. Mary Street; Mill Lane	Wyndham Arcade is a Grade II Listed building. It opened in 1887 and has entrances on St. Mary Street and Mill Lane, running parallel to Cardiff's Café Quarter. This Edwardian arcade is home to several restaurants including ASK.

=== Contemporary ===
Name	Image	Year opened	Entrances	Notes
St. David's Centre		1981	Queen Street, Hill's Street; Working Street; Queens Arcade	St. David's Centre opened to the public in January 1981, although it did not officially open until 24 March 1982. It is joined internally with Queens Arcade. The extension to St. David's Centre (St. David's 2) opened to the public on 22 October 2009. The architects for the project were Benoy and the constructors were Bovis Lend Lease. The development includes the Grand Arcade and Hayes Arcade.
Queens Arcade		1994	Queen Street, Working Street; St. David's Centre	Queens Arcade opened on 28 April 1994, and was built on the former Allders department store and Queen Street Arcade site. The Arcade has two levels, and is unusual in that the levels are sloped, so that ground floor entrance on Queen Street becomes the upper floor at the Working Street entrance and the ground floor entrance at Working Street becomes the lower floor at the Queen Street entrance.
Capitol Centre		1990	Queen Street	The Capitol Centre, which was previously known as the Capitol Exchange Centre, opened in 1990. The Capitol Centre is built on the site of the former Capitol Cinema and Theatre.

== Former shopping arcades ==
Name	Image	Year opened	Year closed	Entrances	Notes
Queen Street Arcade		1866	1987	Queen Street; Working Street	Next to Allders. Both were demolished, then rebuilt as Queens Arcade (above). Included the Washing Institute
Andrews Arcade				Queen Street	
Oxford Arcade		1970s	2006	The Hayes; St. Davids Link	
Queens West Shopping Centre		1987	Circa 1994	Queen Street; The Friary	Featured a glass lift looking out over the Friary. This shopping centre still exists, and is shown on maps, but all shops are now entered directly from the street or via escalators, so the mall corridors are now inaccessible. The top floor, which used to be a foodhall, is now entirely occupied by one shop.
Wharton Street Arcade (James Howells)		1924		Wharton Street; Howells	
Dickens Arcade				Castle Street	Used to include a cafe and a bookshop in the 80s/90s called Paperback Exchange.
Old Arcade		1835		Church Street	Alongside the Old Arcade pub. The pub was named after this arcade.

== See also ==
- List of places in Cardiff
- List of cultural venues in Cardiff
- List of leading shopping streets and districts by city
