= Howies =

Clothing company based in west Wales

- Traded as: howies
- Industry: Outdoor apparel, Sporting goods
- Founded: 1995
- Founder: David and Clare Hieatt
- Headquarters: Carmarthen, Carmarthenshire, Wales
- Products: Clothing
- Website: howies.co.uk

Howies is a clothing company based in west Wales. The company was founded in 1995 and produces eco-friendly T-shirts, jeans and sportswear, with the aim of having ethically correct practices. Howies use natural fabrics as alternatives to petrochemical-derived modern fabrics, including organic cotton, merino wool and recycled cotton. Howies T-shirts often have images or slogans with political or environmental themes and are screen printed by hand in a workshop located at the brand headquarters.

== Brand ==
The Howies brand has a strong identity within many UK active sports, notably mountain biking, surfing and skateboarding, and has sponsored a number of athletes in these disciplines.

It has made a number of special edition products associated with the Howies brand, notably with Curtis Bikes who continue to offer Howies blue as a standard colour option on many of their bikes. The company is particularly well known for its T-shirt designs, notably the classic logo design as well as 9 bikes, CCTV, Life*, Blood Donor and Home Work. The Howies name is often written in lowercase - the company's preferred style.

== History ==
Howies was founded by Clare and David Hieatt in 1995. The name "Howies" is derived from Clare's maiden name of "Howells". Howies first marketing and team manager was Jeff Boardman 1996 - 2001. Branding expert Mark Simmons was managing director from 1999 to 2001. The company relocated from London to Wales in 2001 and the company's first proper mail order catalogue is produced.

In 2003, Levi Strauss & Co. threatened to sue Howies over the placement of a logo bearing tab on the rear right buttock pocket of their jeans. The Howies Tab is grey, the Levis Tab is Red.

In 2011, the Hieatts sold the company to The Timberland Company, for £3.2m. In November 2008, Howies was cited as the 6th most 'recession-proof' company in the UK. In September 2009, David Hieatt, one of Howies' founders, mentioned on Twitter that he was due to leave the company at the end of October 2009. In December 2011, Howies closed its London shop, which was situated on Carnaby Street.

In January 2012, Howies' management team announced that they had purchased the company back and that Howies would continue to operate from Cardigan as an independent company.
