= Cardiff Design Festival =

Annual festival in Cardiff, Wales

Cardiff Design Festival is an annual event organised by the University of Wales Institute, Cardiff in partnership with a number of Cardiff organisations, which since its inception has included Design Wales, an organisation which has a pan Wales remit for supporting and encouraging the use of design. The Festival was first held in 2005, within the City Centre at the Park Plaza Hotel on Cardiff's Greyfriars Road, as well as a number of other events and seminars at various locations around the city.

The 2006 Cardiff Design Festival featured a portable exhibit, which showcased the "Best of Wales", featuring local companies including Asbri, Howies, Hoffi, Orangebox, Staziker Jones, Studio SDA, 6721, Elfen, and Attic 2. The exhibit was transported to the London Design Festival and Dutch Design Week.

The festival incorporates the Best of Welsh Design Awards, with the winners announced towards the end of the 18-day event. Past winners include digital media agency Carbon Studio, architects Hyde and Hyde and environmental designers BWA Design.

The festival has been organised from the outset by Olwen Moseley, of the Cardiff School of Art & Design, who describes it as "part of a global explosion" and a chance to reflect on the state of design in Cardiff and Wales.
