= St David's, Cardiff =

Shopping centre in Cardiff, Wales

Coordinates: 51°28′51″N 3°10′32″W

St David's Dewi Sant
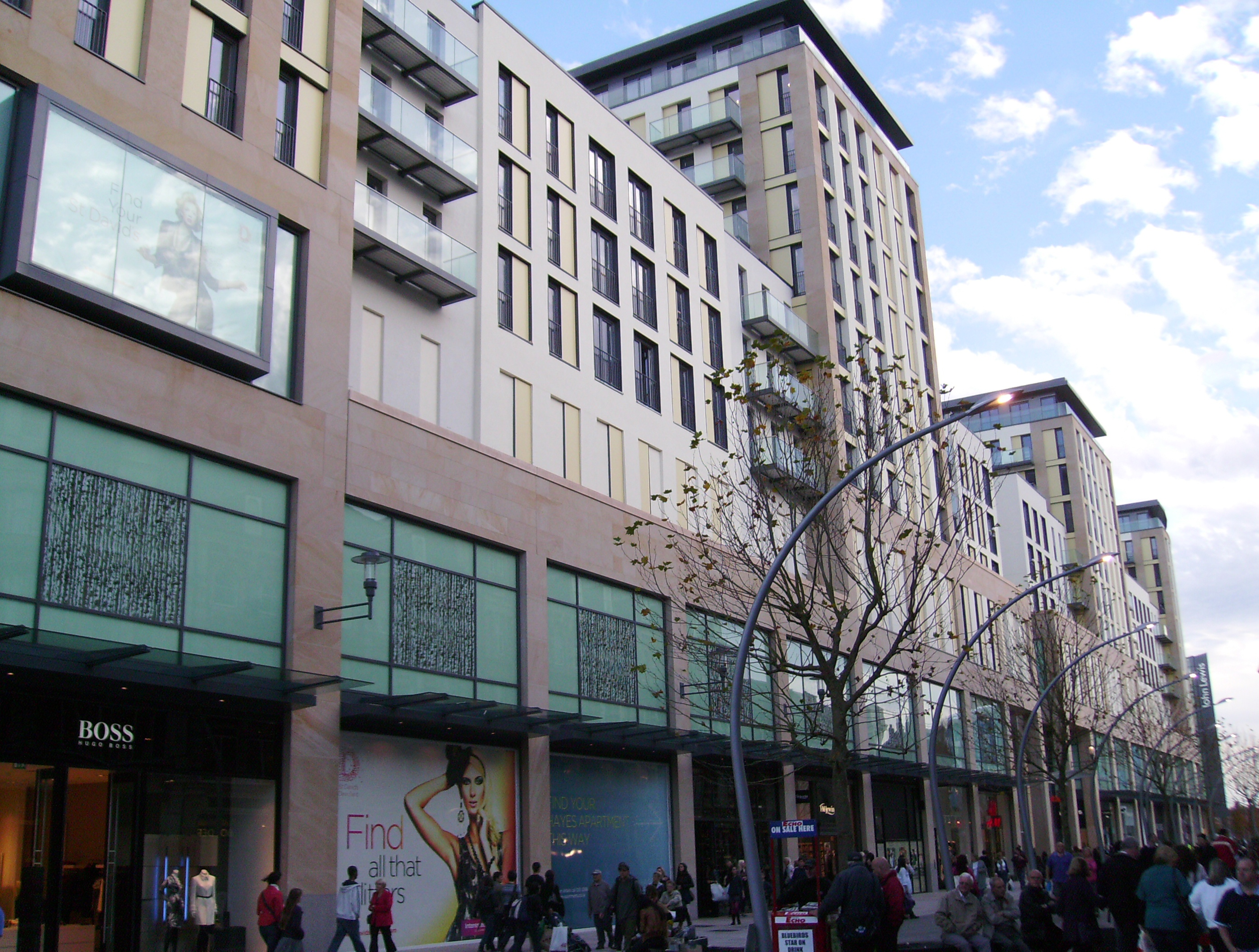
- St. David's second phase on The Hayes. The Hayes Apartments on the upper levels
- Location: Cardiff, Wales
- Opened: 24 March 1982; 44 years ago (phase 1); 22 October 2009; 17 years ago (phase 2)
- Developer: St David's Partnership and Land Securities Group (50%))
- Owner: Landsec; Cardiff Council (Freeholder); Linc-Cymru Housing Association (Barrack Lane)
- Architect: Benoy (phase 2); Building Design Partnership (library); Glenn Howells (Hayes Apartments)
- Num. of stores: 203
- Num. of anchor tenants: 4 (Boots, Marks & Spencer, Primark and John Lewis)
- Floor area: 129,561 m^{2} (1,394,580 sq ft)
- Floors: 9 (2 shopping levels, 1 restaurant seating level and 6 car park levels)
- Parking: 2,550
- Website: www.stdavidscardiff.com

St David's (Welsh: Dewi Sant), previously known as St David's Shopping Centre, is one of the principal shopping centres in the city centre of Cardiff, Wales. It is in The Hayes area of the southern city centre. Following the extension of St David's 2 in 2009, St David's is the third busiest shopping centre in the United Kingdom.

The construction of the extension cost a total of £675m and brought Cardiff within the top five shopping destinations in the United Kingdom. The centre consists of the original first phase - St David's Centre - adjoining St David's Hall and the second phase, given the development name of St David's 2. The second phase of the shopping centre opened on 22 October 2009, when the first 58 of its 88 stores opened for business.

== History ==
In 2008–9, the annual footfall of the centre was 27 million, and it was expected to rise to 33 million in 2009–10. 20 million people visited the centre during the first six months after the opening of St David's 2.

St David's was crowned the international shopping centre of the year in 2010 by Global Retail Leisure International, beating contenders in Portugal and Singapore.

St David's and other centres were patrolled in 2009 by three paramedics on bicycles between every Friday and Sunday in order to respond rapidly to medical emergencies.

=== First phase ===
Entrance to St David's first phase on Working St

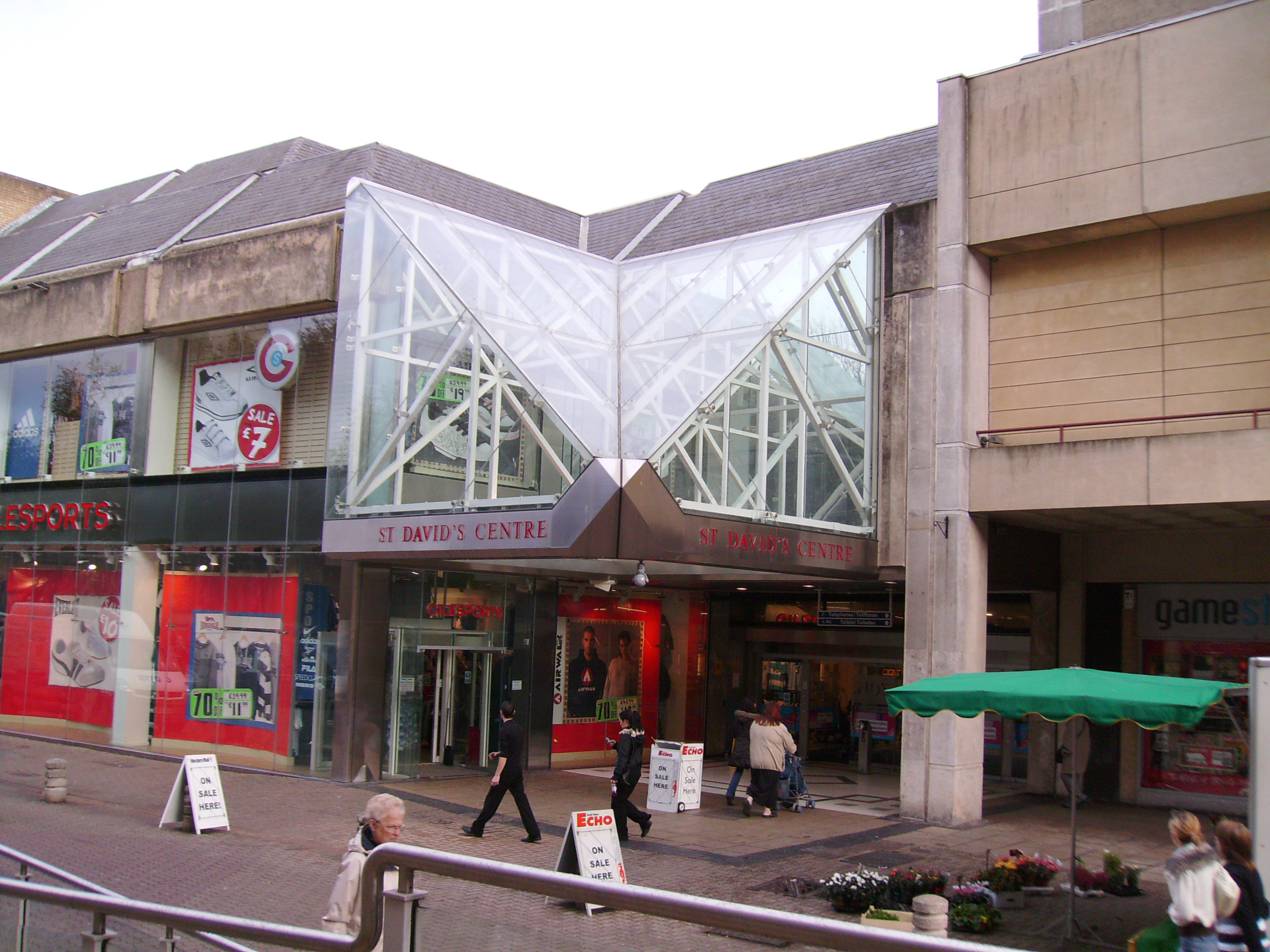
December 2007

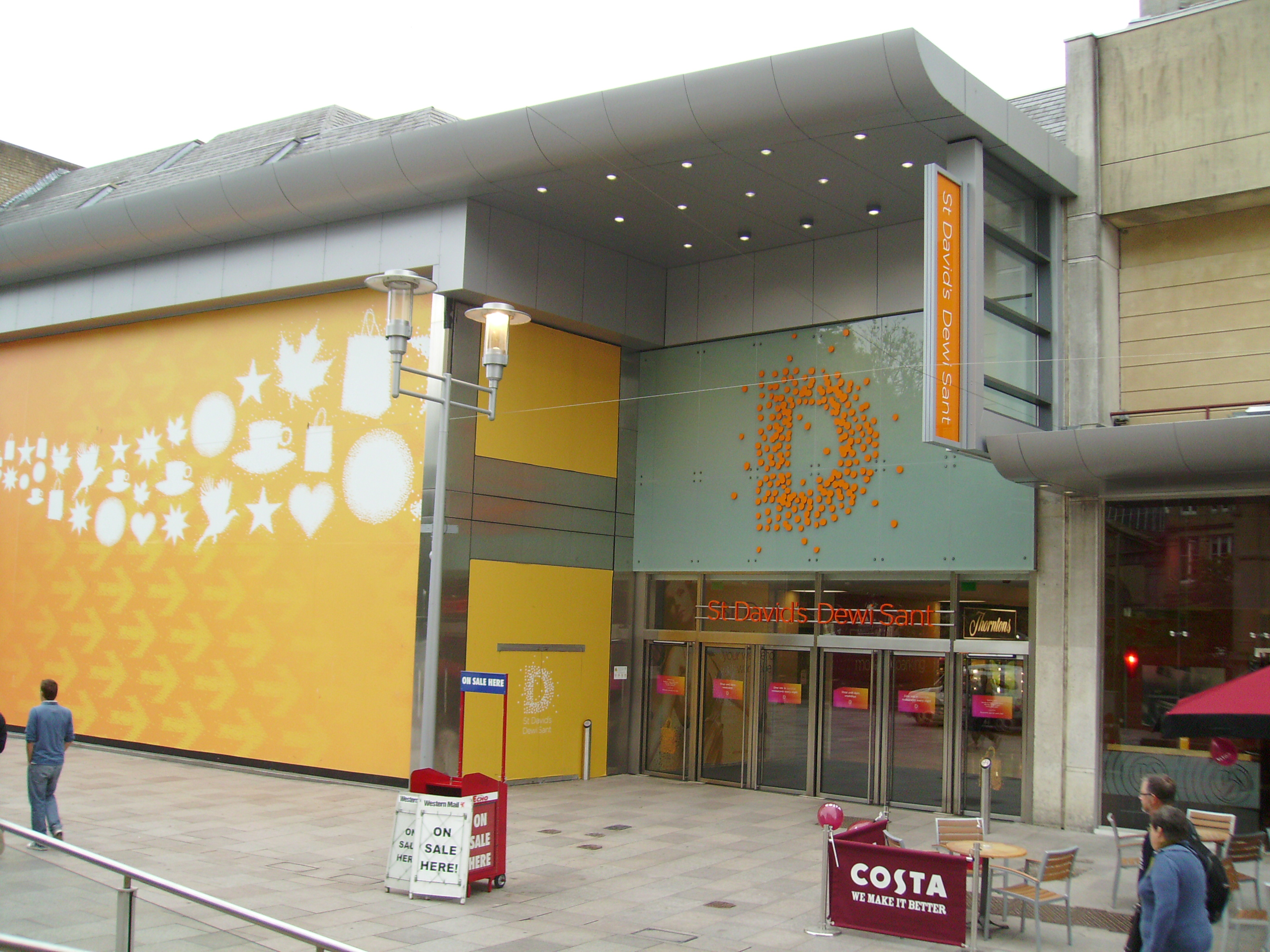
June 2010

St David's Shopping Centre was open to the public in January 1981, although it did not officially open until 24 March 1982. The centre has four entrances located on Queen Street, Cathedral Walk, Working Street and Hills Street. The entrance on Hills Street connects to the northern entrance of the second phase of the shopping centre, open at street level and via an enclosed bridge on the first floor. It is also joined internally with Queens Arcade. There are three thoroughfares within the centre: Town Wall, Cathedral Walk and St David's Way.

The centre attracted an average footfall of 39,000,000 per annum and has a core catchment of 2.4 million people. The 12 million tourists that visit the city annually help generate over £7.5 billion in retail spending. There are seventy-five individual shops and stores in the first centre that cater for a broad demographic. The centre was anchored by Boots, Debenhams, Marks & Spencer and Primark in 2007. St David's Hall was built on top of the shopping centre.

=== Second phase (St David's 2) ===
Demolished buildings to make way for St. David's 2

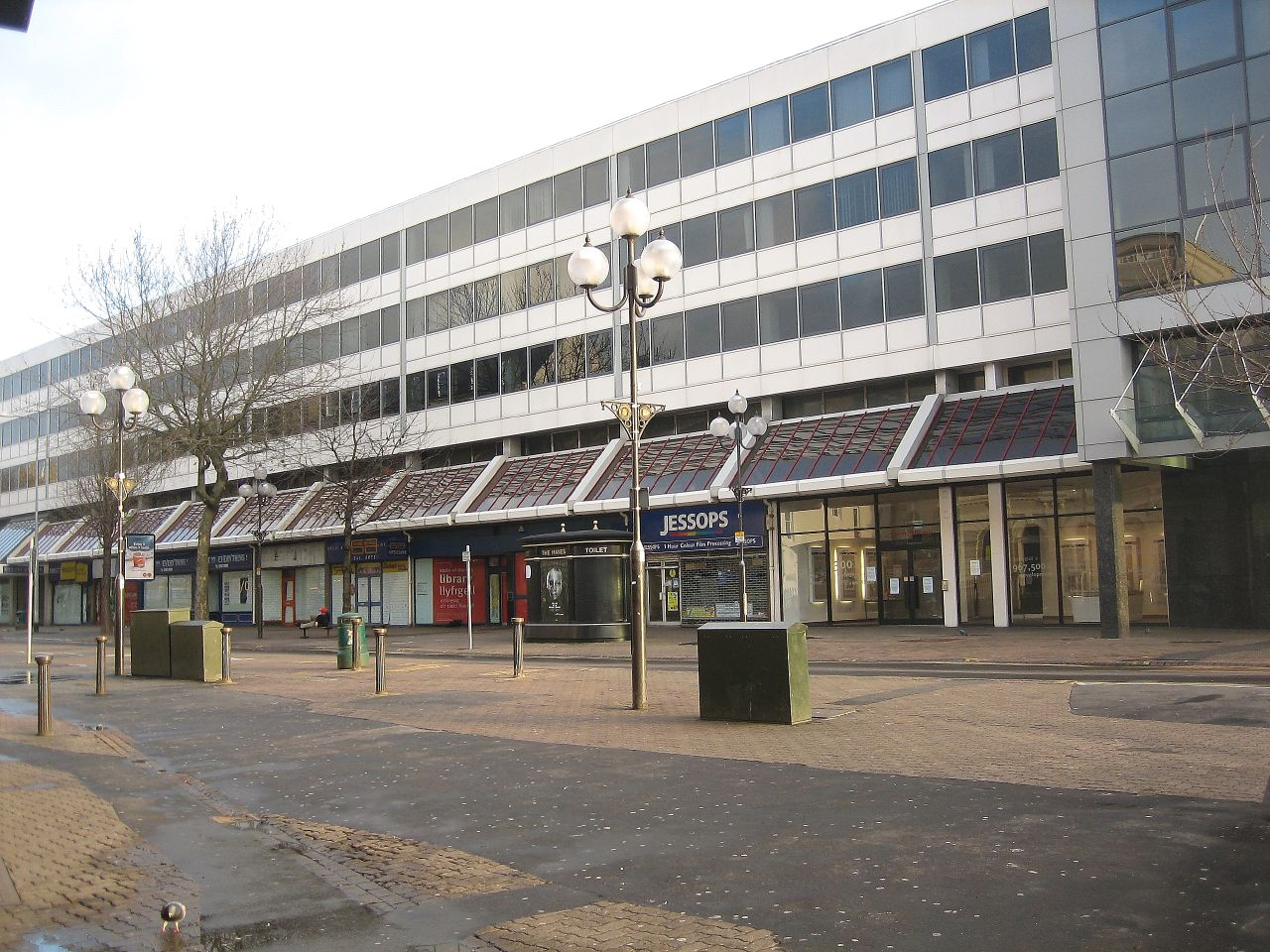
Oxford Arcade, The Hayes

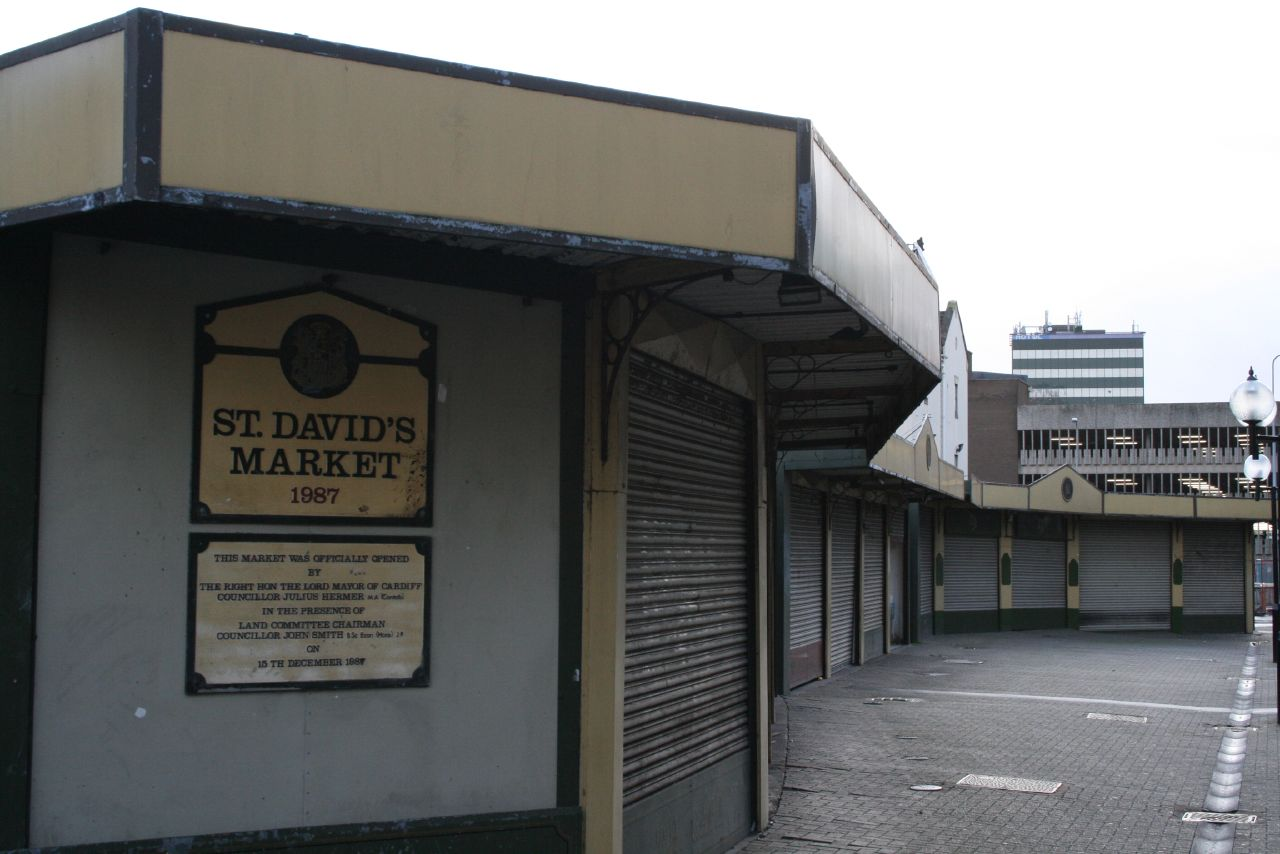
St David's Market

Central Library and Bridge St car park (St David's Link)

St David's, and much of the southern end of Cardiff city centre's shopping area, was re-developed as part of the St David's 2 development.

The second phase was a £675 million extension of the centre, in which a large part of Cardiff's south city centre was demolished. Demolished buildings included Oxford Arcade, St David's Market, St David's Link including the Cardiff Central Library, the NCP Tredegar Street multi-storey car park, the Wales National Ice Rink, the NCP Bridge Street multi-storey car park, and Toys "R" Us who relocated to Cardiff International Sports Village.

The second phase of St. David's was known as St David's 2 during the construction phase, but both phases were simply named "St David's" when the second phase was completed. The second phase consists of three main buildings in total: the Central Library building, which is built on part of the Marriott Hotel car park, the John Lewis department store, which is built on the former Wales National Ice Rink, and the main shopping area, which is built on the former Oxford Arcade, St David's Link and western side of Bridge Street. It also includes apartments, called Hayes Apartments, above the main shopping centre.

St. David's second phase (St. David's 2)

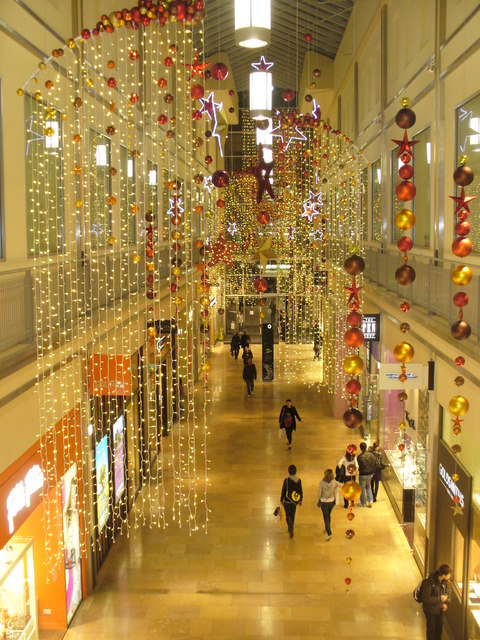
Hayes Arcade

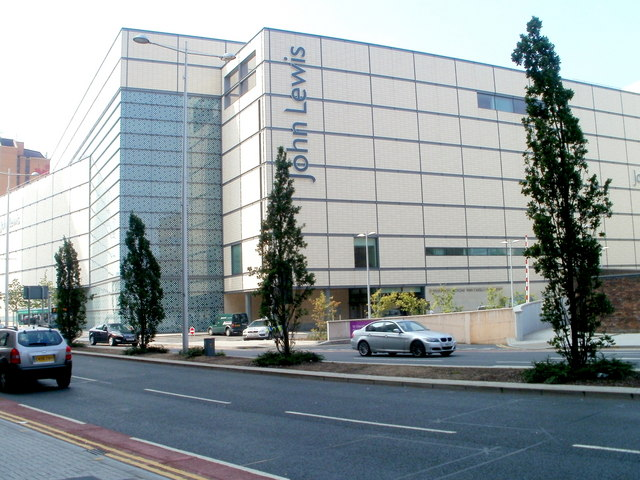
John Lewis

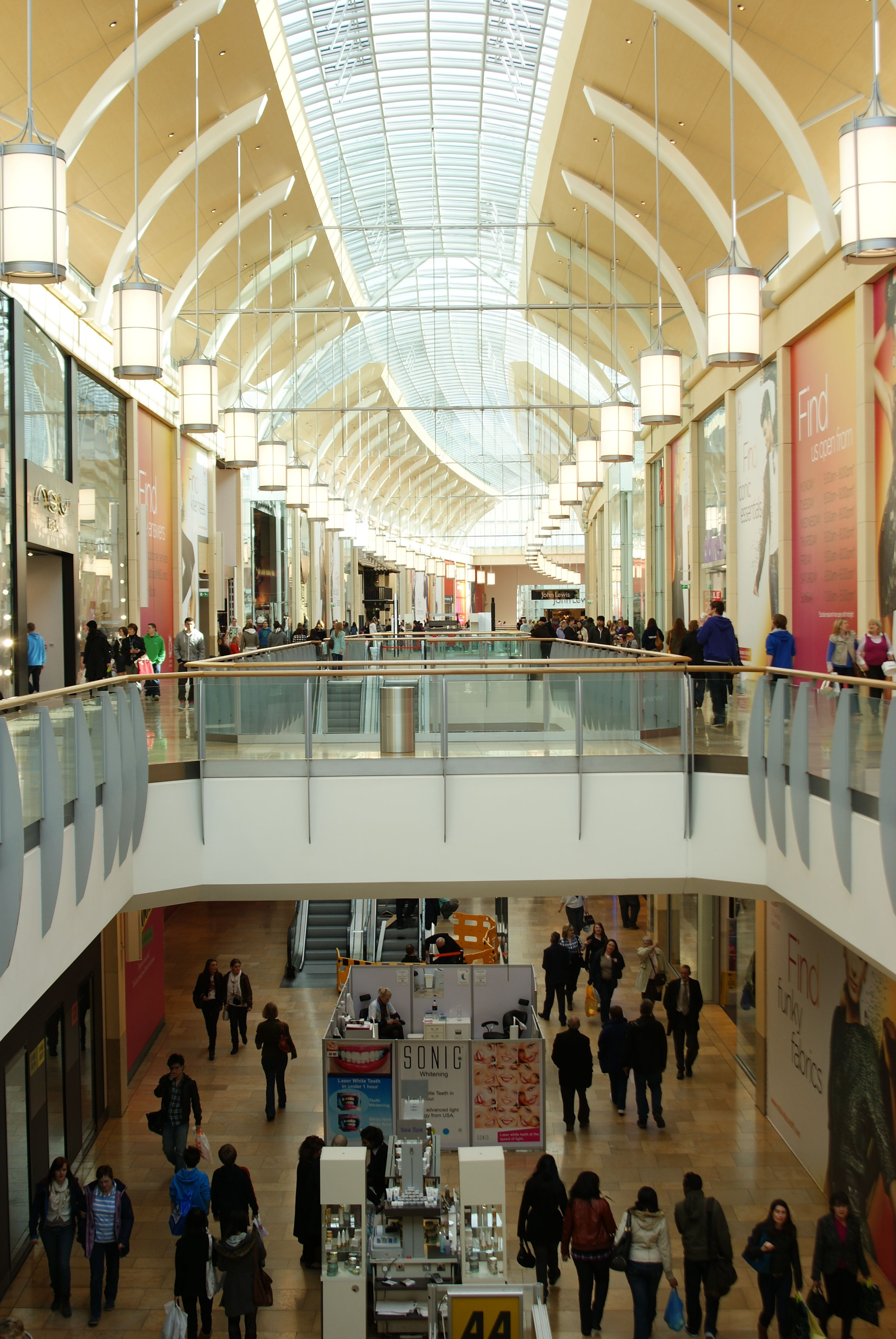
Grand Arcade

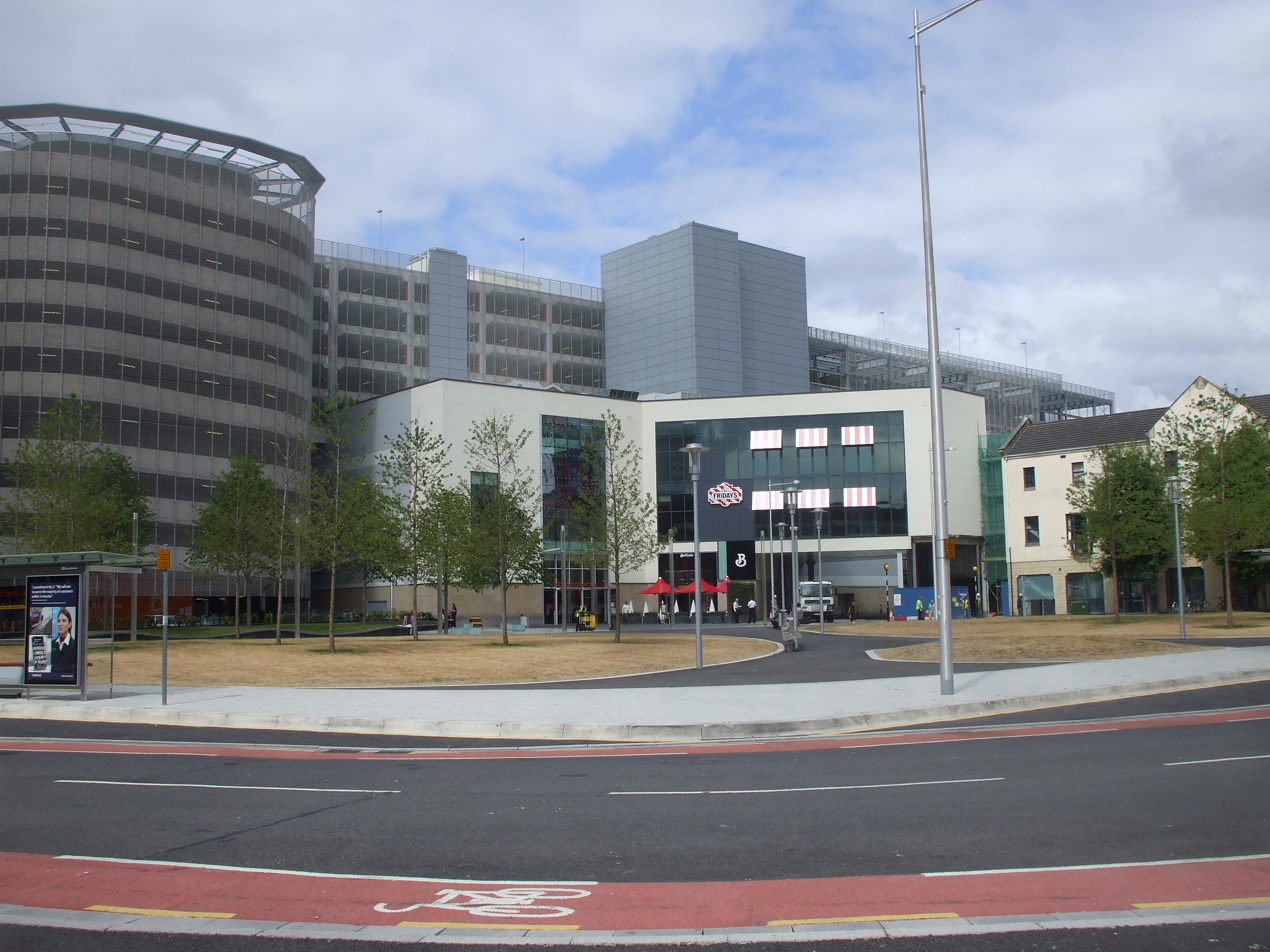
The multi-storey car park and entrance to Eastside

The second phase is made up of different sections, they are:

- St David's Walk, leading to the extension of Debenhams and the Grand Arcade.
- St David's Way, The original part of St David's.
- Grand Arcade, connecting St David's Walk in the original centre to John Lewis. The Grand Arcade was split over two floors.
  - The Upper Grand Arcade had other shops and stores.
  - The Lower Grand Arcade
- Eastside is the restaurant and café quarter of the second phase of the centre. It is split over two levels.
- Working Street, part of the façade of St David's Hall, was converted into store fronts to better blend with the facade of the Working Street entrance of St David's Centre.
- The first Welsh branch of the John Lewis department store chain opened in 2009 and is the largest John Lewis store in the UK outside London. The John Lewis department store opened four weeks before the St David's Grand Arcade shopping area was opened.

St David's 2 has added an extra 967,500 sq ft (89,880 m^{2}) of retail space to the city centre, in addition to the 260,000 sq ft (24,000 m^{2}) John Lewis department store, nine other large stores, and a further 90 smaller shops in a two-tiered shopping mall have been built. It has also created 3,000 car parking spaces, new bars and restaurants plus the new 55,000 sq ft (5,100 m^{2}) Central Library and 4,500 permanent jobs. The development has included two new arcades: Grand Arcade and Hayes Arcade to reflect Cardiff's historical Victorian arcades.

The project, that was hoped to make Cardiff one of the top five shopping destinations in the United Kingdom, topped out on 27 January 2009. Many of the retailers in the second phase of the centre were new to Cardiff, and to Wales, in particular John Lewis, Apple, Hollister, and Victoria's Secret.

Demolition and construction progress of St David's 2 (2007–2009)
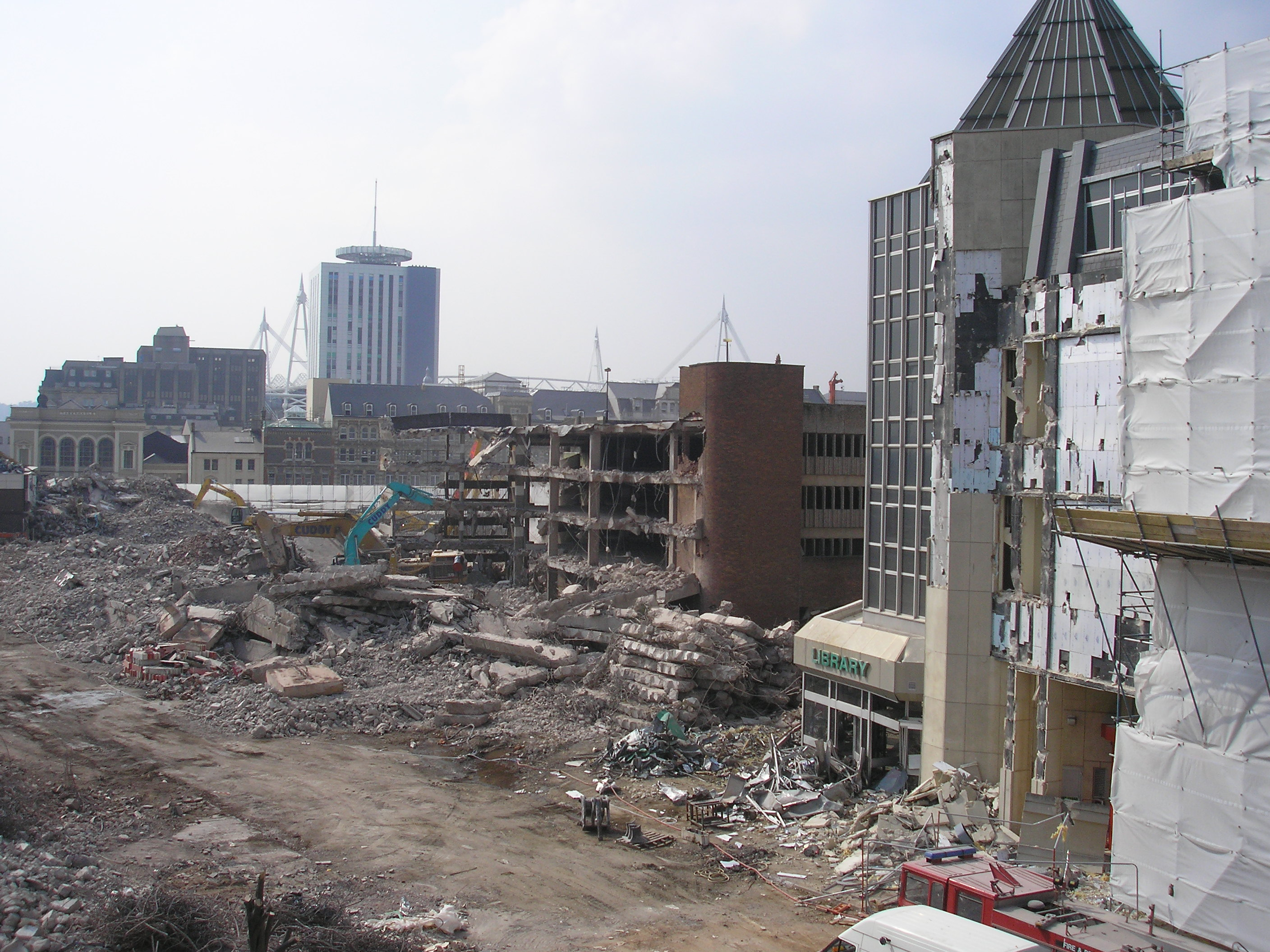
Central Library and Bridge St car park (April 2007)

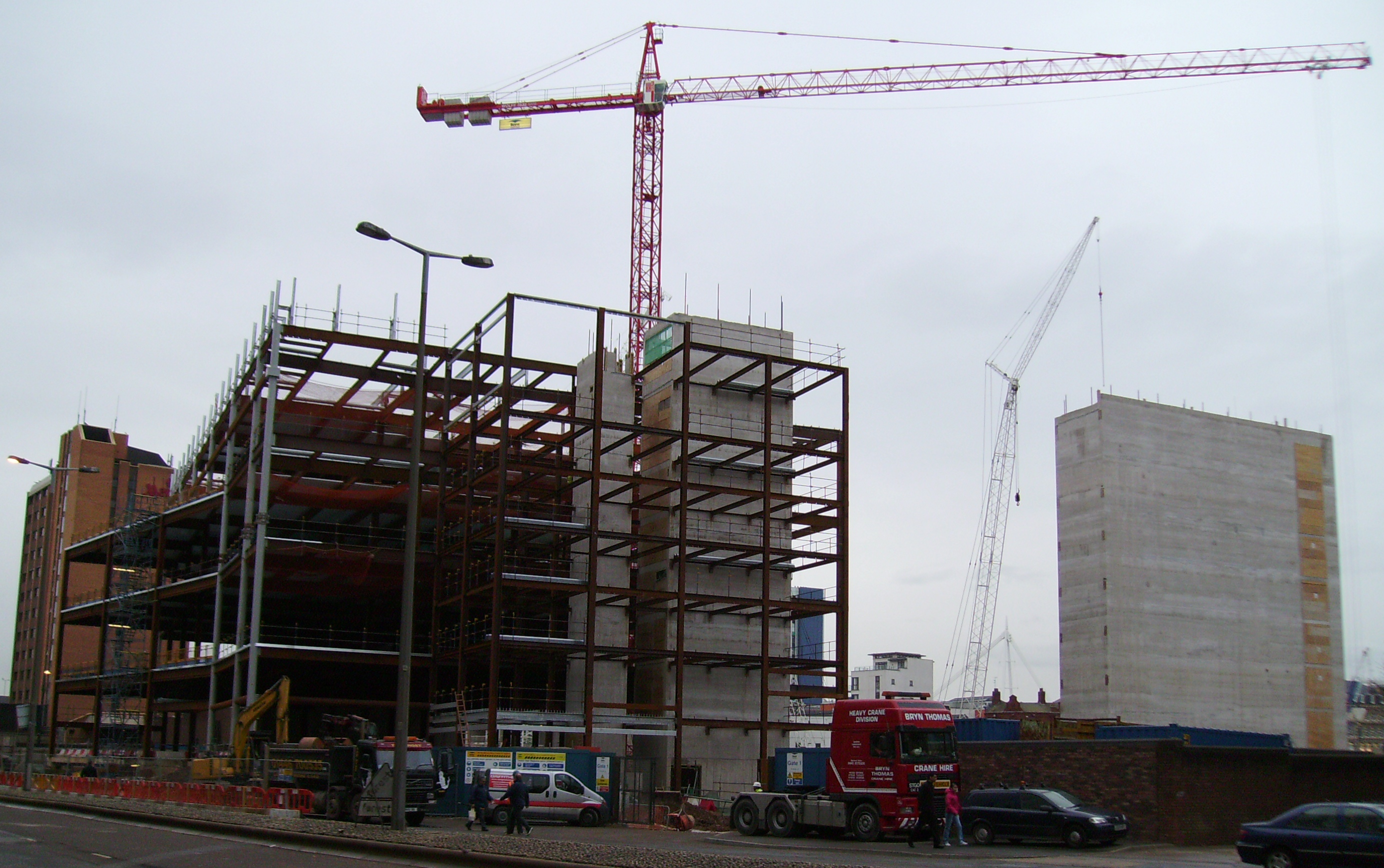
John Lewis store (December 2007)

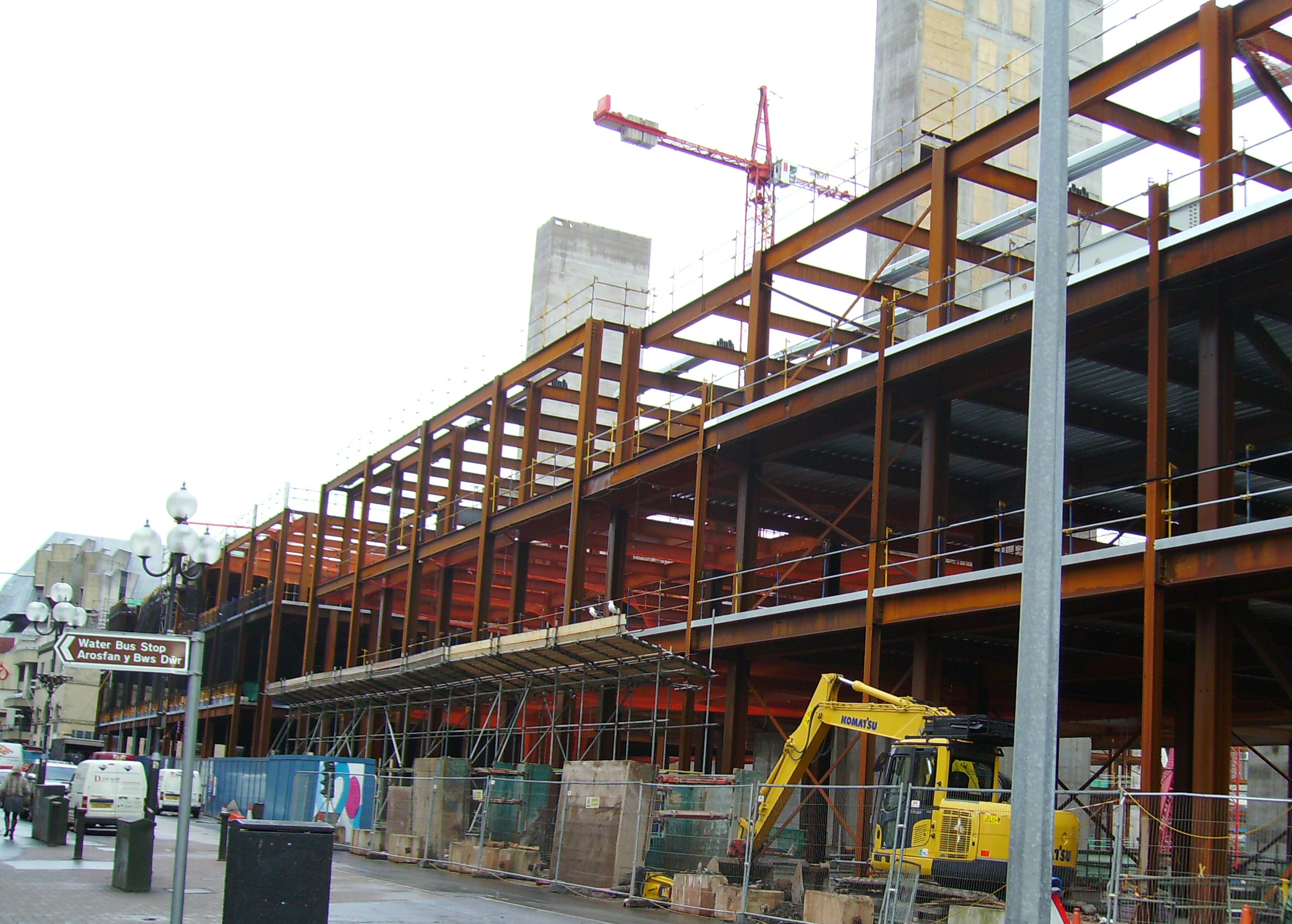
The Hayes in April 2008

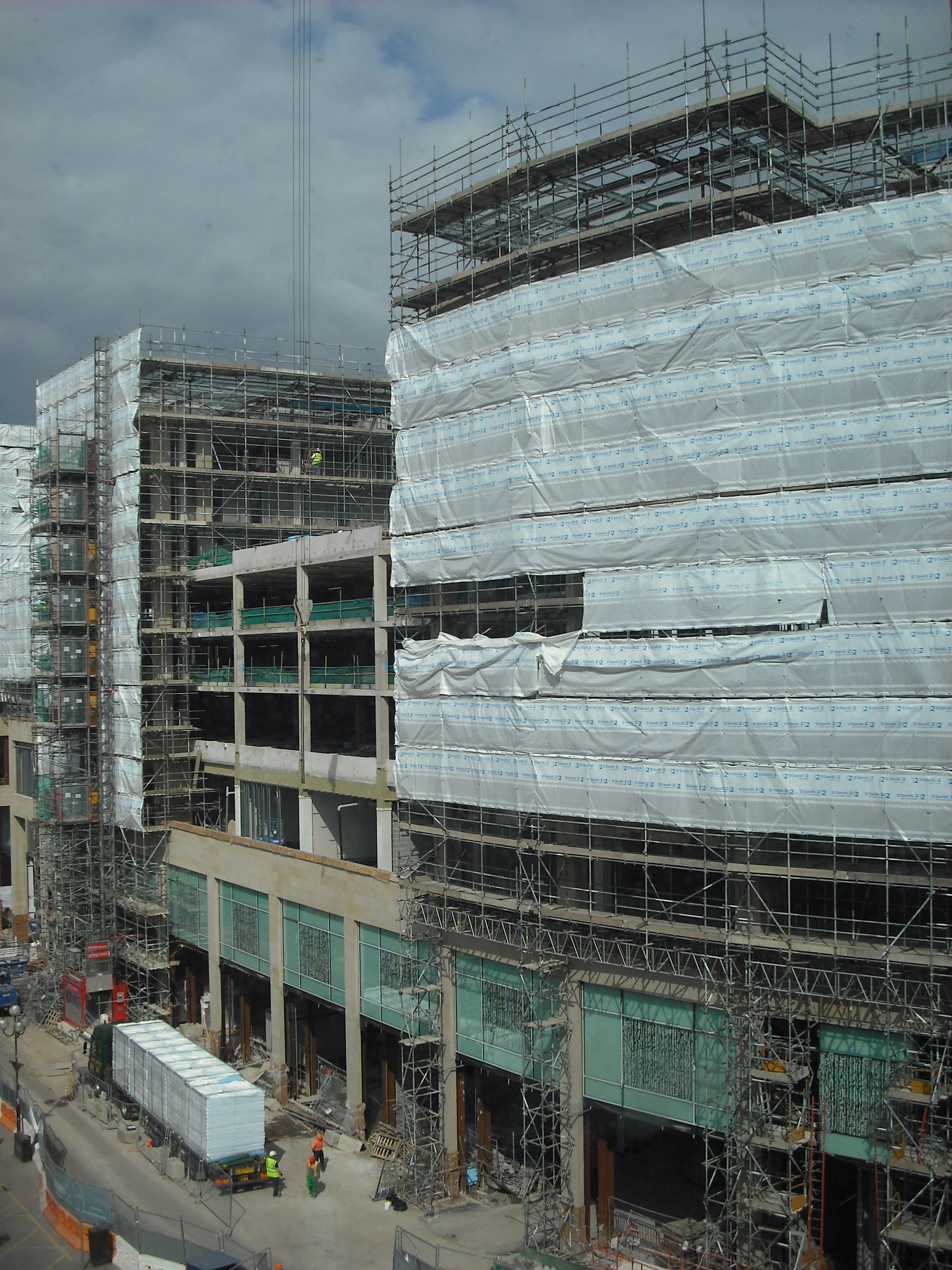
The Hayes in April 2009

Upper floor of two-tiered shopping mall (July 2009)

=== Cardiff Central Library ===
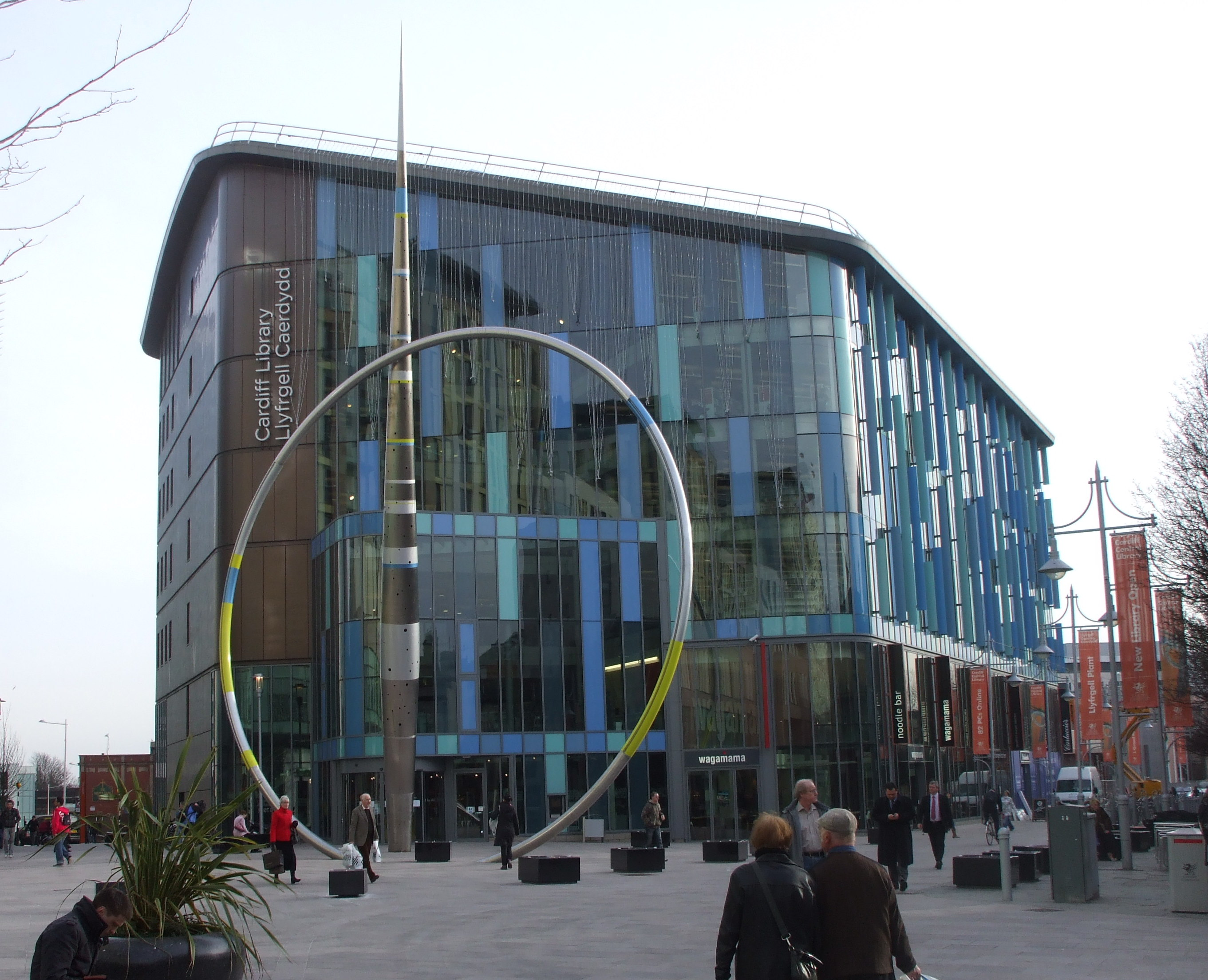
Cardiff Central Library with the Alliance sculpture in the forefront

The former Central Library was located a few hundred yards north of the present building and was knocked down to make way for the St David's 2 development. The new Central Library opened on 14 March 2009.

=== Alliance ===
Alliance is a 25 metres (82 ft)-high sculpture in The Hayes. The sculpture consists of a large stainless steel and enamelled metal arrow column and a hoop, which glows in the dark, and falls and rises with the tide. It was paid for by the St David's shopping centre as part of a £1.5m public art scheme in the city centre, was installed in the space between the new shopping centre and Cardiff Central Library.

=== Hayes Apartments ===
Hayes Apartments is part of St David's regeneration development by St David's Partnership; it is a joint venture between Land Securities and Capital Shopping Centres. It consists of 304 apartments above the shopping centre in seven blocks known as phases. The apartments are a mixture of studio flats and 1 and 2 bedroom apartments. The architects for the residential Hayes Apartments were Glenn Howells Architects. Hayes Apartments has private courtyard gardens designed by Hyland Edgar Driver and planted above the rooftop of the shopping centre.

In summer 2010, the first residents moved into Hayes Apartments, which was launched by an outdoor garden party on the development's private courtyard gardens. Sales in the first two phases were announced as completed at the end of 2010 and sales began in the third phase, block 4, which is the largest block. The development was due for completion in 2012.

=== Barrack Lane Retail Quarter ===
Barrack Lane, retail and affordable housing.

Barrack Lane Retail Quarter is a residential and retail development. It forms part of St David’s and has nine shop units and 27 apartments. It is owned and managed by Linc-Cymru Housing Association, which is an organisation that specialises in affordable housing in Wales.

== Logos and identity ==
Logos used at St David's

The 1st phase logo

Used during the construction phase

The initial "people" design

The final "dots" design introduced Oct 2009

Johnson Banks Design Ltd were commissioned by Capital Shopping Centres and Land Securities to provide a new logo and identity for the new St David's shopping centre. The designers said

The overall identity is based on the thought that hundreds of thousands of people will gather and use the new centre as their meeting place, and our "people" diagrams swiftly became the beginnings of the entire scheme... The "people", simplified down to dots, become the linking element in a scheme that applies across a vast array of items, from fonts to symbols and images.

== Rail access ==
- Cardiff Central
- Cardiff Queen Street

== See also ==
- List of places in Cardiff
- List of shopping arcades in Cardiff
- List of shopping centres in the United Kingdom
- List of the largest shopping centres in the United Kingdom by size
- List of largest shopping malls in the world
