= Capitol Centre, Cardiff =

Capitol Centre
- Location: Cardiff, Wales
- Coordinates: 51°28′56″N 3°10′20″W
- Address: Queen Street, Cardiff
- Opened: 1990
- Owner: NewRiver Retail
- Num. of stores: 36
- Num. of anchor tenants: 3
- Floor area: 158,256 sq ft (14,702.5 m^{2})
- Floors: 2
- Parking: 420
- Website: capitolshopping.co.uk

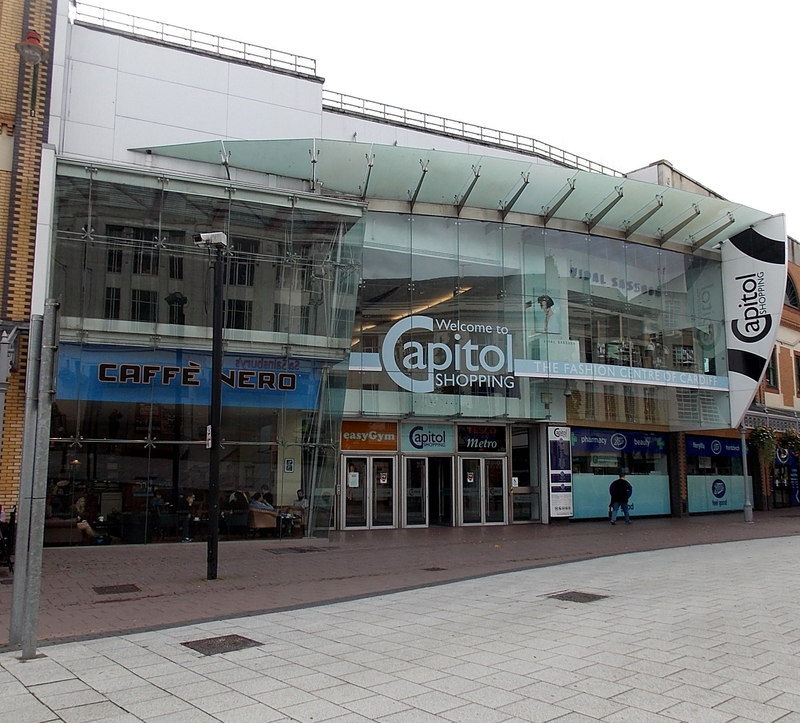
Entrance to the Capitol Centre

Capitol Centre (Welsh: Canolfan Capitol) (previously: Capitol Exchange Centre (Welsh: Canolfan cyfnewid Capitol)) is an indoor shopping centre in the city of Cardiff, Wales. Functioning as one of the city's retail malls, The building is built on the site of the former Capitol Theatre, and is situated at the eastern end of Queen Street near the Dumfries Place bus terminus and Cardiff Queen Street railway station. It was announced in 2026 that Capitol will be partially rebuilt as an Entertainment Complex, with construction estimated to be completed at some point in 2027.

It was anchored by a large H&M store, with the front of the centre being dominated by Tesco since Virgin Megastores and Zavvi ceased operations in 2009. Tesco has dominated the front of the Capitol Centre since November 2012.

== History ==
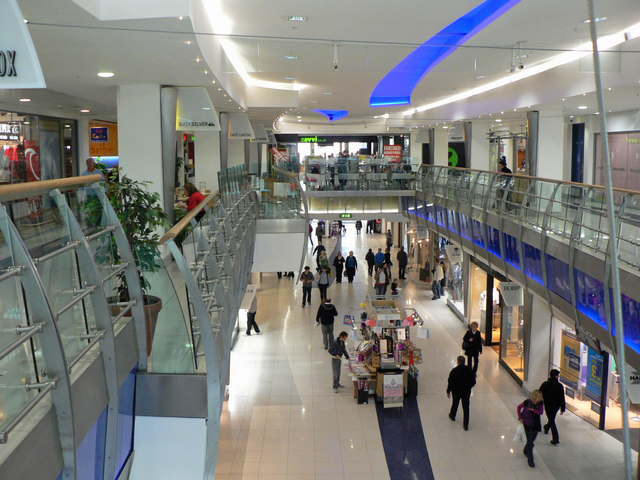
Inside the Capitol Centre

The Capitol Centre was opened in 1990, with attempts to replicate the original architecture. Ceramic tiles from the previous Victorian Dutch Cafe tearooms were incorporated on the eastern exterior. The style of build dated very quickly and, in 1999, the centre underwent a £10 million redevelopment, which included the refurbishment of the pedestrian areas, the removal of the food court and new entrances into the centre (although much of the original external facade still remains). It was completed in November 1999.

There were plans to develop 164 apartments, plus retail and commercial space and additional car parking facilities at the corner of North Edward Street and Station Terrace. This would provide 50 per cent additional spaces, bringing the total car parking spaces up to 632. The scheme architects, Dobson Architects, expected it could be completed by 2012, but this never happened.

In 2015 Capitol Centre was bought by new owner NewRiver Retail.

In 2022 plans were revealed to create a new 14,500 sq ft food court in attempts to revive the centre's fortunes.

== Cinema ==
The centre had originally also housed a five-screen Odeon cinema up until 2001, it has reopened in April 2015 operated by Premiere Cinemas. In October 2022, Premier Cinema closed permanently.

== See also ==
- List of shopping arcades in Cardiff
