= Spillers Records =

World's oldest record shop; in Cardiff

Coordinates: 51.47879°N 3.17707°W

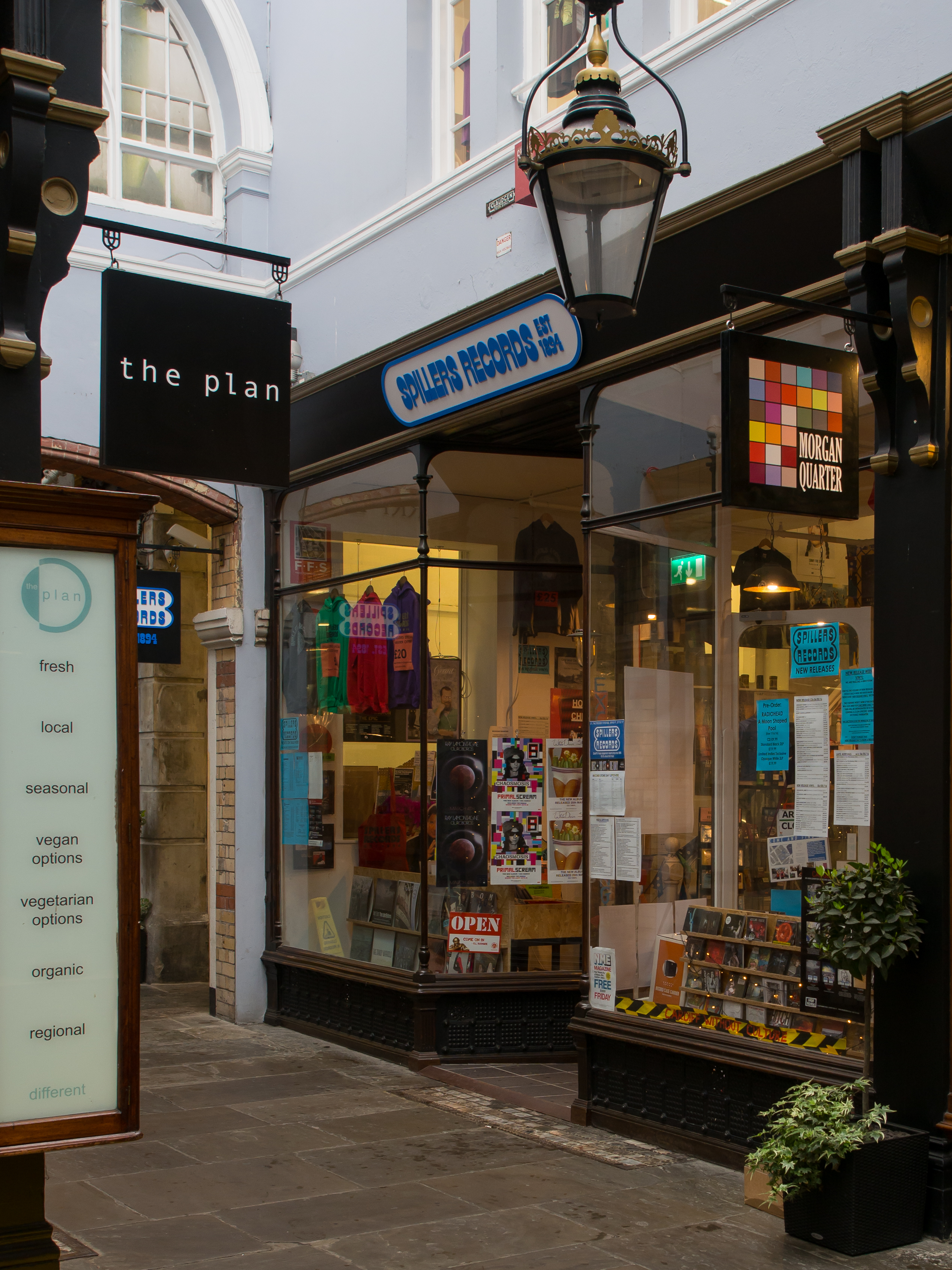
Spillers Records in the Morgan Arcade (2016)

Spillers Records, established in 1894, is recognised as the world's oldest record shop.

== History ==
Spillers was founded in 1894 by Henry Spiller at its original location in Queens Arcade, where the shop specialised in the sale of phonographs, wax phonograph cylinders and shellac phonograph discs and also sold and repaired musical instruments. In the early 1920s, Spiller's son Edward took over the running of the business and, with the aid of the popular accordionist and bandleader Joe Gregory, sold musical instruments alongside the pre-recorded music. In the late 1940s the shop moved around the corner to a larger premises on The Hayes.

In 2006, the shop's future was made uncertain when the site rent was increased by Spillers' landlords, Helical Bar, who stated that they were keen for the shop to survive. A local campaign to save the shop was initiated, including a petition initiated by Owen John Thomas (then the Assembly Member for South Wales Central) and supported by members of the Welsh Assembly, Manic Street Preachers and Columbia Records. In 2010 Spillers moved to the nearby Morgan Arcade, initially on a temporary basis, with the expectation that the move will be made permanent if successful.

In 2019, Spillers called for a boycott of Morrissey and his music due to his support for a far-right political party.

== Gallery ==
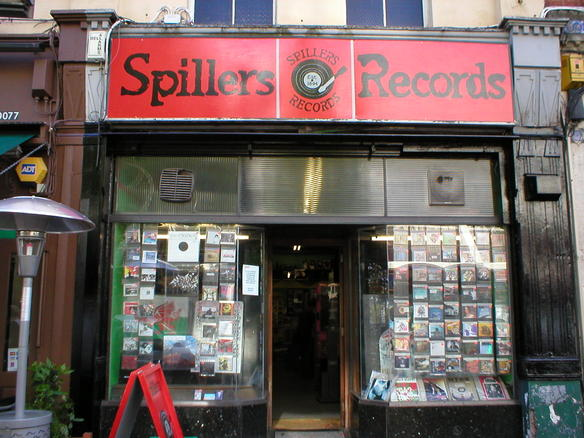
Second location in The Hayes (2007)

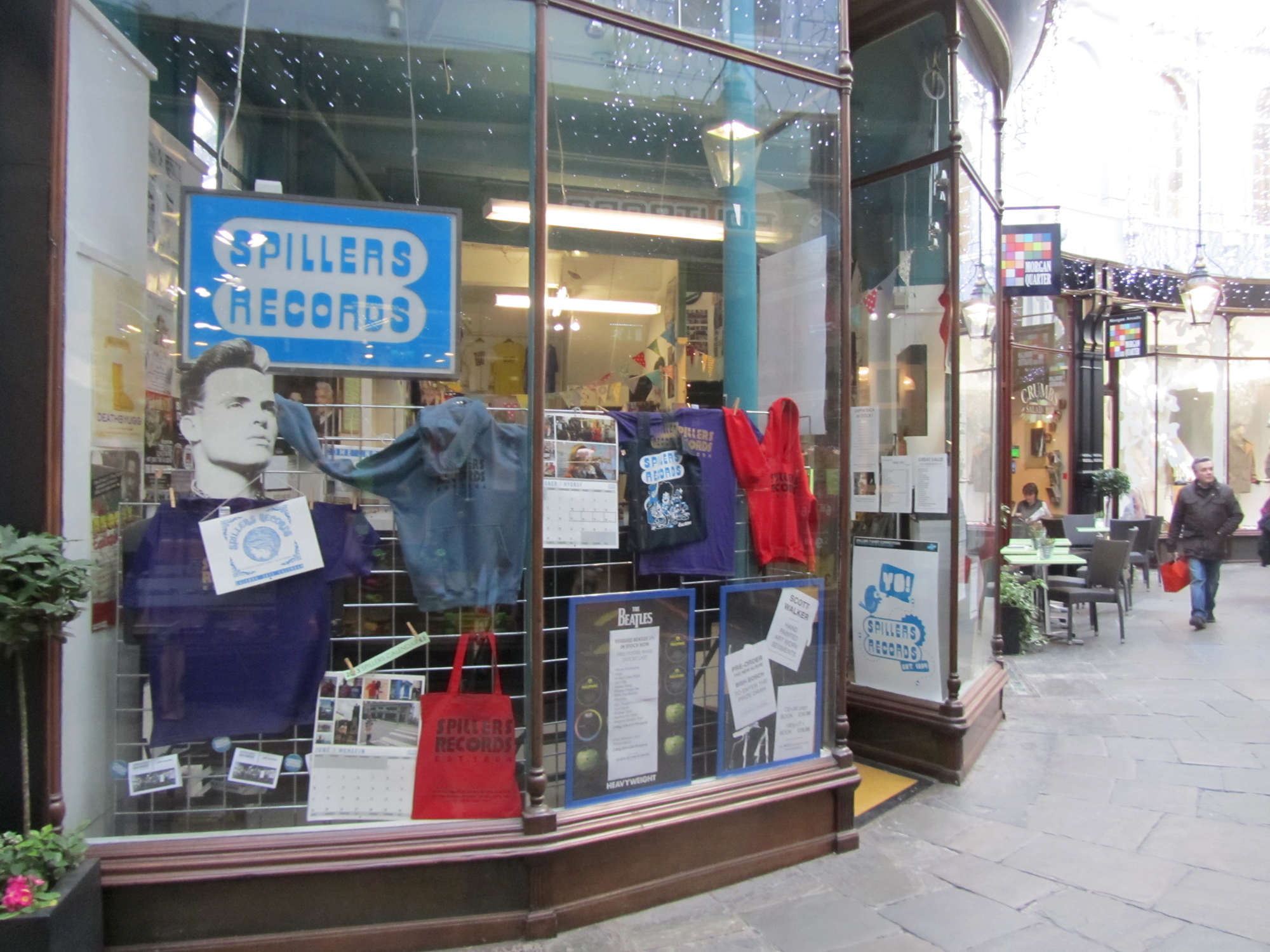
In the Morgan Arcade (2012)

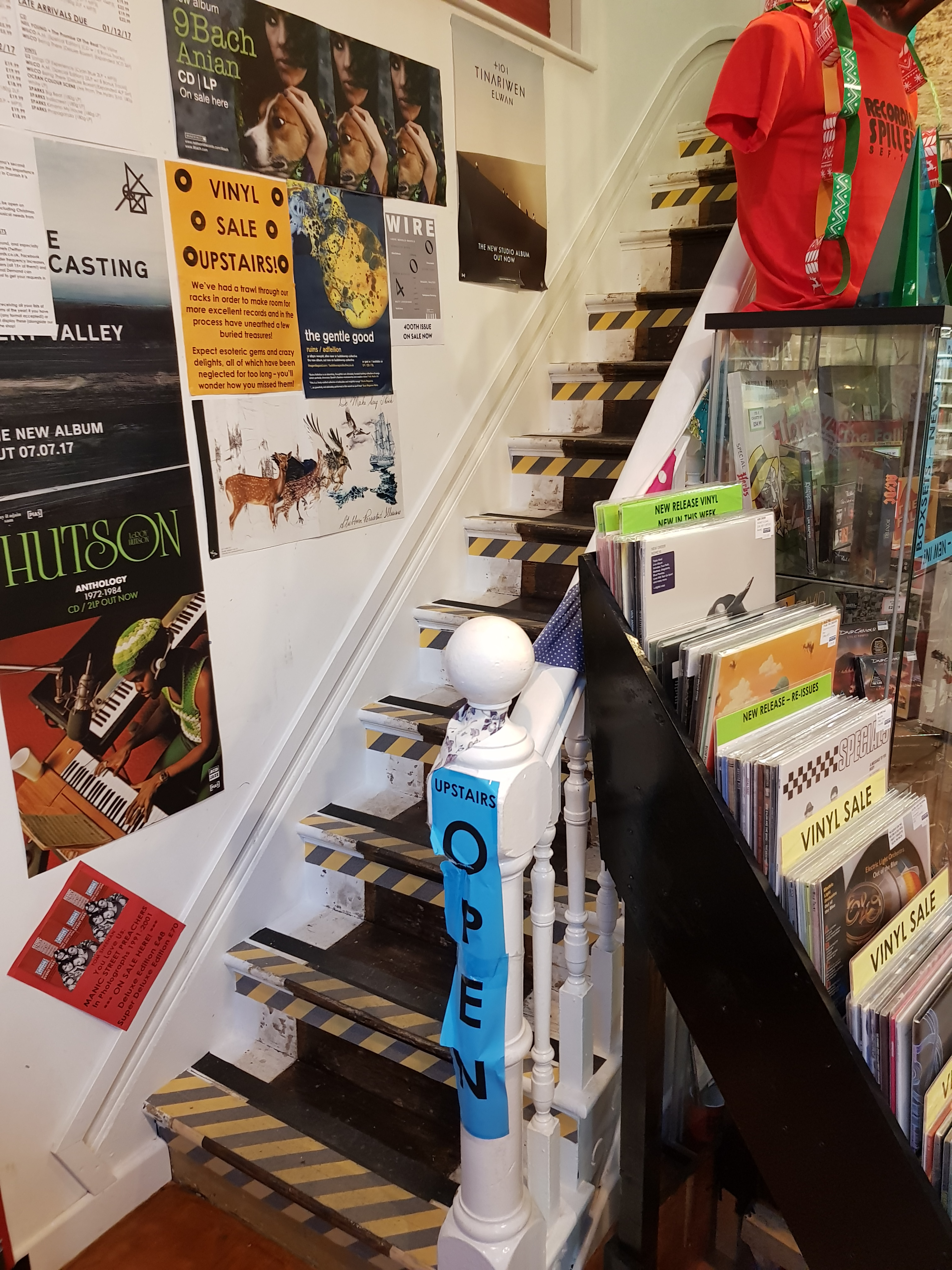
Interior (2017)

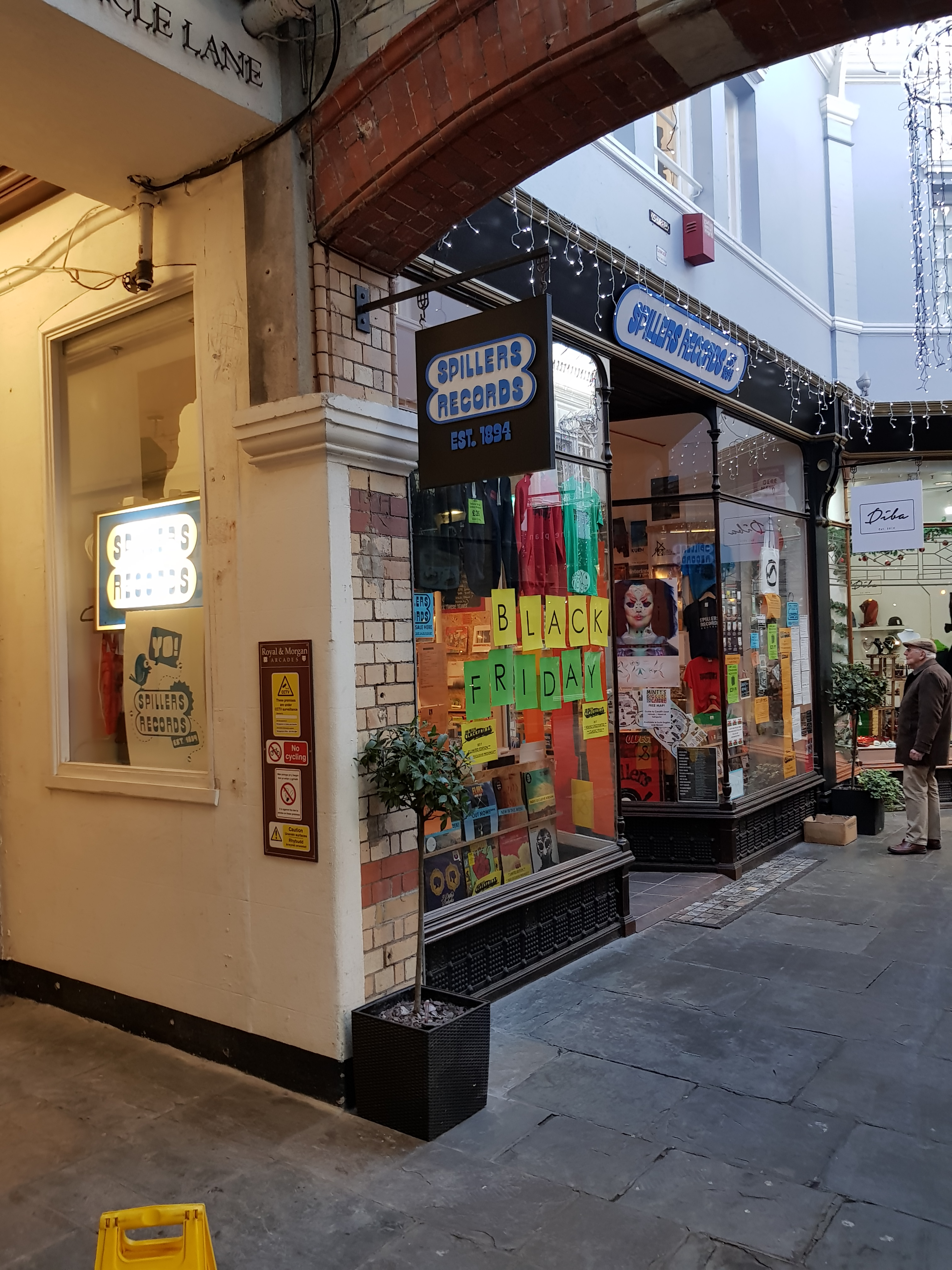
Exterior (2017)
