= Queens Arcade =

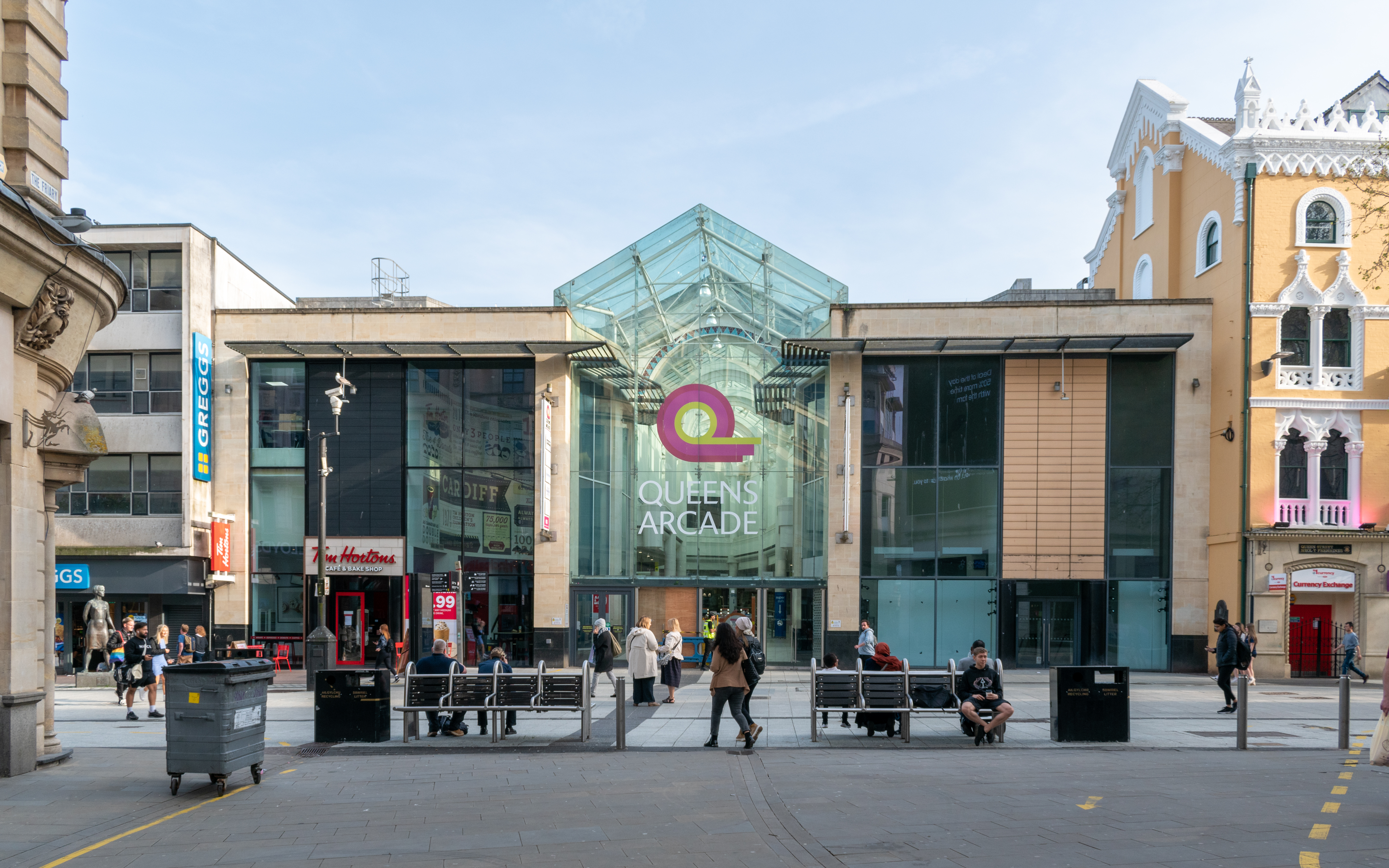
- Queen Street entrance to Queens Arcade
- Location: Cardiff, Wales
- Coordinates: 51.481°N 3.177°W
- Address: Queens Arcade, Queen Street, Cardiff, CF10 2BY
- Opened: 28 April 1994
- Manager: AEW Europe & Tristan Capital
- Owner: Addington Capital
- Floor area: 9,638 m^{2} (103,740 sq ft)
- Floors: 2
- Website: queensarcadecardiff.co.uk

The Queens Arcade (Welsh: Arcêd y Frenhines) is a shopping centre in Cardiff city centre. It opened on 28 April 1994.

== History ==
Developed on the site of the Allders department store and the similarly named Queen Street Arcade, the main entrance is located on Queen Street, and the second entrance faces Working Street near Cardiff Central Market. The arcade has two levels, and is unusual in that the levels are sloped, so that despite its two entrances being on the same level the upper floor at the Working Street entrance is the ground floor at Queen Street. The centre internally connects with the St David's Centre.

The arcade recorded 11.2m annual footfall in 2012 and is anchored by New Look, Argos, Tim Hortons and Post Office. Four of its stores – Argos, Christopher George, F. Hinds and Whittard of Chelsea – have been in the centre from its launch and others from the opening year line-up have changed their company names – such as Cookie Jar, now Millie's Cookies, and Partners, now Ryman. By 2016 it had a 10 million annual footfall.

It was put up for sale in 2016 for £33 million. It was proposed to be demolished in plans in 2021. In February 2023, the centre was put into receivership.

As of November 2025, it was in the process of being "reinvented" as a “leisure mall”, which will host live performances, and will also contain sporting areas (including courts for padel), plus interactive exhibitions and theatrics using digital projection.

The former Queen Street Arcade on Working Street in 1987

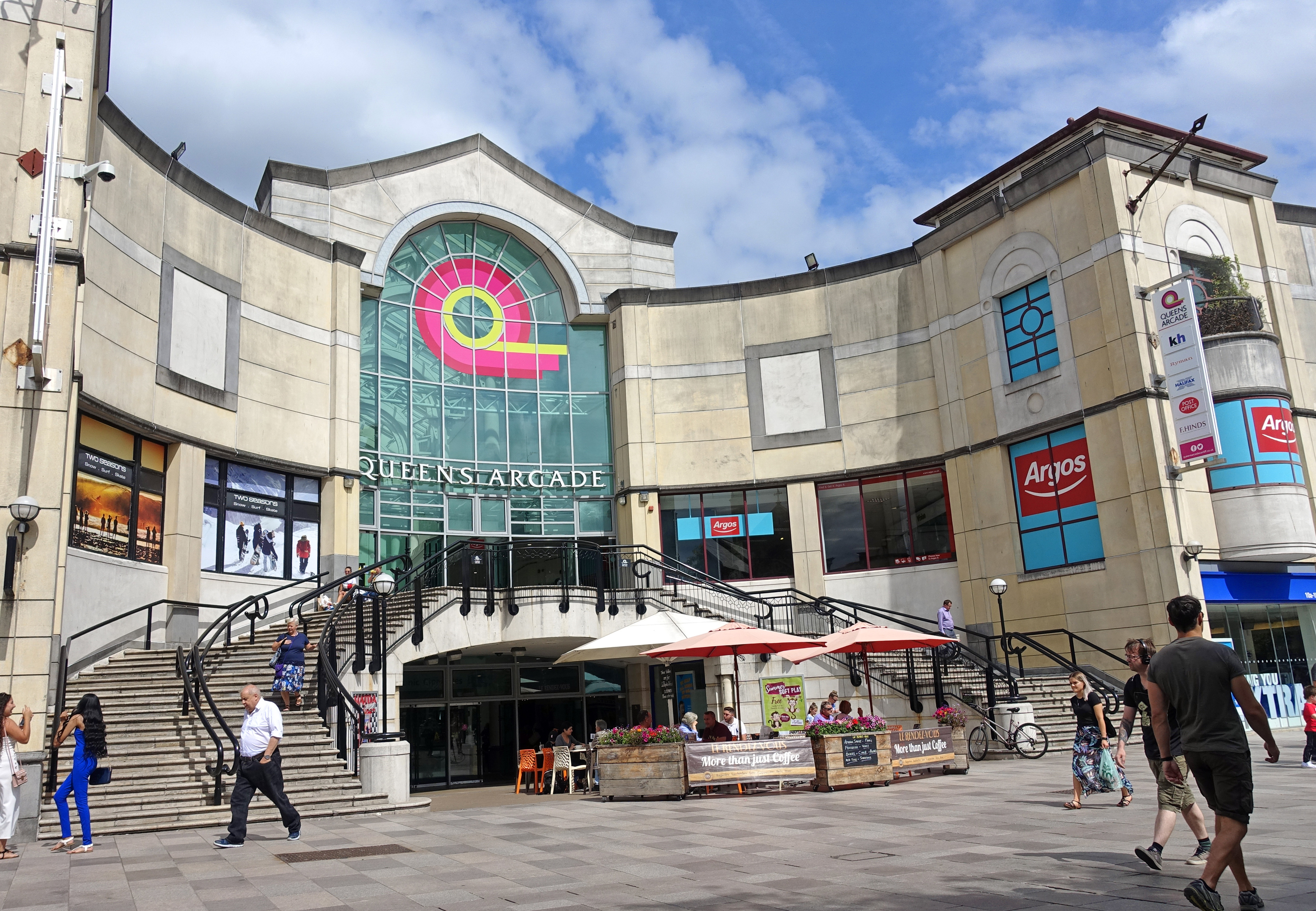
Working Street entrance of the Queens Arcade in 2018

== In popular culture ==
The original architecture was inspired by the many late 19th-century arcades of Cardiff city centre and has appeared as the backdrop for various TV programmes, including the 2005 Doctor Who story "Rose", starring Christopher Eccleston and Billie Piper, which was set in London.

== See also ==
- List of shopping arcades in Cardiff
