= Hayes Island Snack Bar =

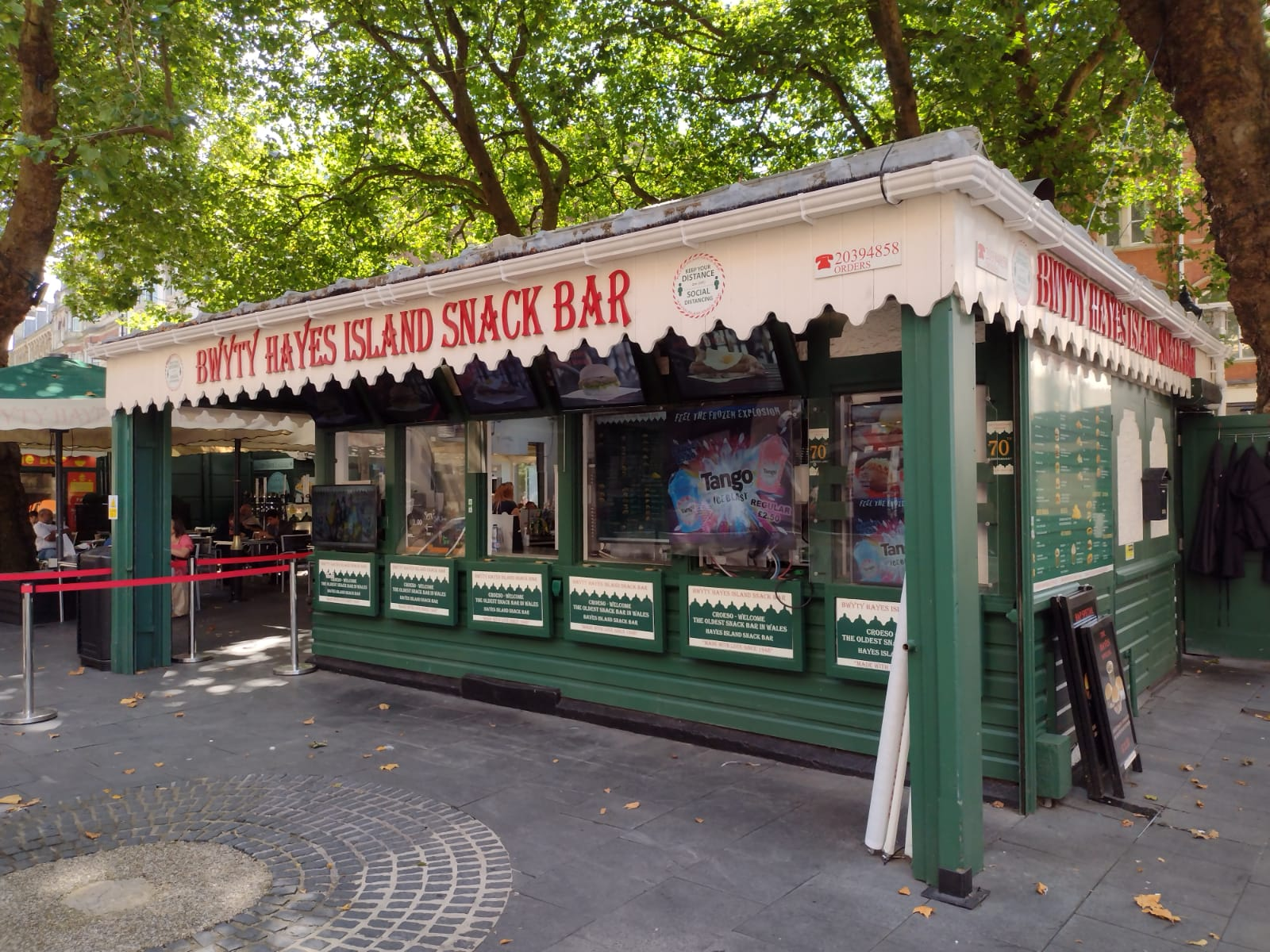
- “an unmistakeable Cardiff landmark”

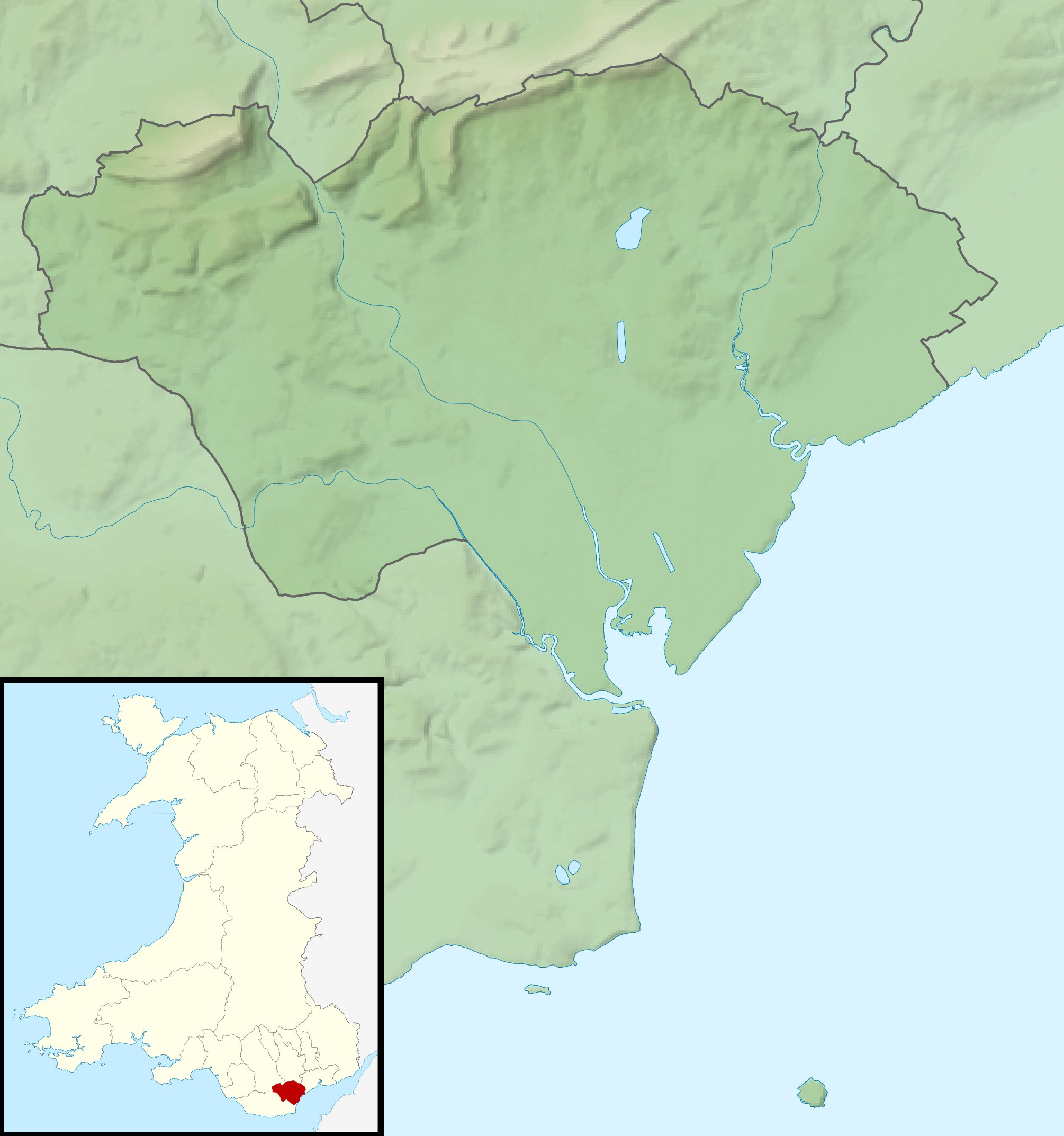
- Location within Cardiff
- 51.4799°N 3.1769°W
- Type: Snack bar
- Location: The Hayes, Cardiff, Wales

History
- Built: 1911

Site notes
- Governing body: Cardiff Council

Listed Building – Grade II
- Official name: Hayes Island Snack Bar
- Designated: 13 December 1996
- Reference no.: 18053

Listed Building – Grade II
- Official name: Gentlemen's Toilets
- Designated: 13 December 1996
- Reference no.: 18051

Listed Building – Grade II
- Official name: Ladies' Toilets
- Designated: 13 December 1996
- Reference no.: 18052

Listed Building – Grade II
- Official name: Lamp Post
- Designated: 13 December 1996
- Reference no.: 18054

Listed Building – Grade II
- Official name: Lamp Post
- Designated: 13 December 1996
- Reference no.: 18055

Hayes Island Snack Bar is located on The Hayes in the centre of Cardiff, Wales. It was built as a parcel depot for Cardiff Corporation Tramways in 1911. Closed in 1942, the kiosk was redeveloped as a snack bar which opened in 1948. It is described as the oldest operating snack bar in Wales. Since 2013 it has been operated by the Worton family, under licence from Cardiff Council. The kiosk is a Grade II listed building. The adjacent Ladies' and Gentlemen's toilets date from 1898 and were the first public conveniences in Cardiff. The toilets, and the two contemporary lamposts, are also Grade II listed.

== History ==
The Hayes forms a rectangular space in the centre of Cardiff, bounded to the east by St David's Hall and to the west by the former David Morgan's department store. At its, triangular, northern end, a pedestrian space forms Hayes Island, the location of the snack bar, and of a statue of John Batchelor, a Victorian Mayor of Cardiff. (Note: John Batchelor, known as "The Friend of Freedom", was a shipbuilder and Radical politician who opposed the "Tory" control of Cardiff politics led by the Marquesses of Bute. The erection of a statue in his memory was fiercely contested by his political opponents, who gathered 12,000 signatories for a petition demanding its removal.) In the early 20th century, Cardiff Corporation Tramways was established to operate electric trams throughout the city, replacing the previous horse tram system. In addition to passenger services, the Corporation operated an extensive parcel distribution service. The Hayes Island Snack Bar was built in 1911 as a parcels depot. It continued in use until 1942, when the parcel service ceased. In 1949, the structure was redeveloped and reopened as a snack bar. It continues in operation and in 2018 celebrated its 70th anniversary as the oldest operating snack bar in Wales and an “unmistakeable Cardiff landmark.”

The Ladies' and Gentlemen's Toilets date from 1898 and were the first public conveniences in Cardiff. Closed due to budget cuts in 2013, they were reopened in 2014 and are operated by the Worton family, licensees of the snack bar, under arrangement with Cardiff Council.

The snack bar is referenced by Carol Ann Duffy, the former Poet Laureate, in her poem Letting the Light In.

Extract,
It prepared us for the lofty gravity
of museum, warehouse, galleried arcades
Victorian covered market, old library
whispering its multilingual stories,
tea and talk under the trees in the open air
at the Hayes Island Snack Bar.

— Letting the Light In by Carol Ann Duffy. Published in John B. Hilling's The Architecture of Wales: From the First to the Twenty-First Centuries

== Architecture and description ==
The snack bar is of timber construction, the woodwork being original, although the roof has been replaced. The ends of the structure are gabled with scallop designs, a motif also used on the overhanging canopy. The kiosk is a Grade II listed building. The toilets have original Victorian fittings, decorations and railings and are also listed Grade II. The lampposts are contemporary with the toilets and have their own Grade II designations. Cadw's listing record for the snack bar notes its importance as "a rare survival of Cardiff's tramway system" and its "group value with other listed buildings at Hayes Island."

== Sources ==
- Hilling, John B. (2018). The Architecture of Wales: From the First to the Twenty-First Centuries. Cardiff: University of Wales Press. ISBN 978-1-786-83285-6. OCLC 1257790624.
- Newman, John (1995). Glamorgan. The Buildings of Wales. London, UK: Penguin Books. ISBN 978-0-140-71056-4.
