= John Batchelor (politician) =

Welsh Victorian businessman and politician (1820–1883)

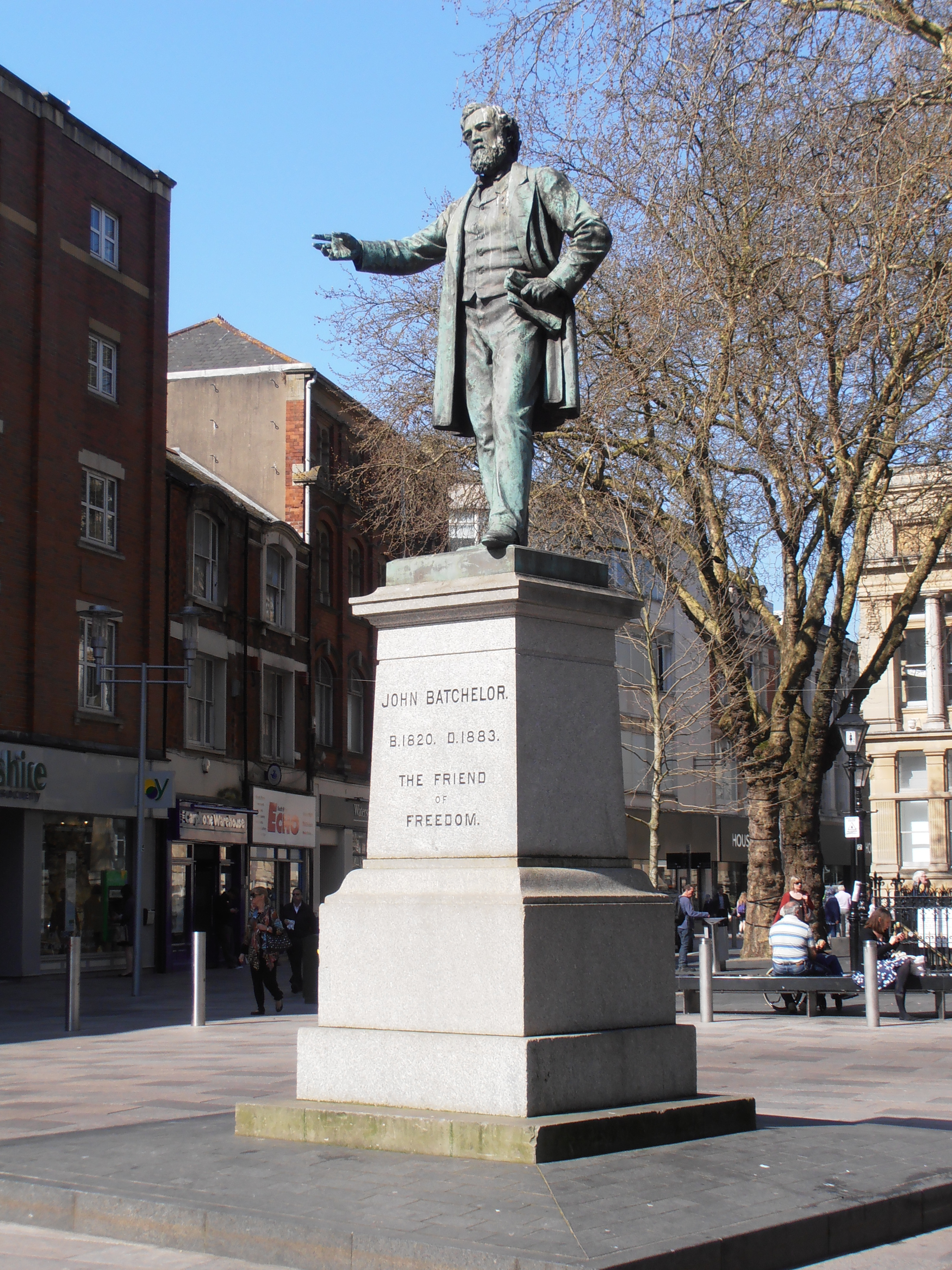
- Statue of John Batchelor in The Hayes, Cardiff
- Born: 1820
- Died: 1883 (aged 62–63)
- Other name: "Friend of freedom"
- Occupations: Businessman and politician
- Political party: Liberal

John Batchelor (10 April 1820 – 29 May 1883) was a Welsh Victorian businessman and politician, who earned the epithet "Friend of Freedom".

== Life and career ==
Although born in Newport, Monmouthshire, Batchelor became a prominent Cardiff figure, having moved there in his early twenties. He set up business as a timber merchant and, later, slate merchant and also played a key role in establishing the Mount Stuart Dry Dock.

He was an active Liberal politician and served as a Liberal Councillor and, later, Mayor of Cardiff, in addition to being Chairman of the Cardiff School Board. He also campaigned against slavery.

=== Conflict with the Butes ===
However, John Batchelor's political activity brought him into conflict with the Bute family (John Crichton-Stuart, 3rd Marquess of Bute), who had significant land-holdings in Cardiff, including Cardiff Castle, and had built much of the docks.

The Butes supported the Tory party and many believed that their conspiring led to the collapse of Batchelor's shipbuilding business.

== Death and legacy ==
John Batchelor died in 1883 and was buried at Cathays Cemetery, alongside his son Tom Eustace, who had died in infancy.

=== Statue ===
A subscription fund was established to erect a statue in his memory. This was followed by a petition of 12,000 signatures, started by his opponents, campaigning against the statue. The statue, created by the sculptor James Milo Griffith, was finally unveiled on 16 October 1886 and stands in The Hayes, Cardiff. Its plinth is inscribed “JOHN BATCHELOR B.1820 D.1883 THE FRIEND of FREEDOM”.

A Conservative solicitor, T. H. Ensor, wrote a scathing piece in the Western Mail, suggesting the words "Friend of Freedom" be replaced with "traitor to the Crown... hater of the clergy... sincerely mourned by unpaid creditors". He was sued unsuccessfully for libel. The case set a legal precedent in British law that the dead could not be libelled.
