= Cardiff Centenary Walk =

Tourist walkway in Cardiff, Wales

Coordinates: 51.481°N 3.180°W

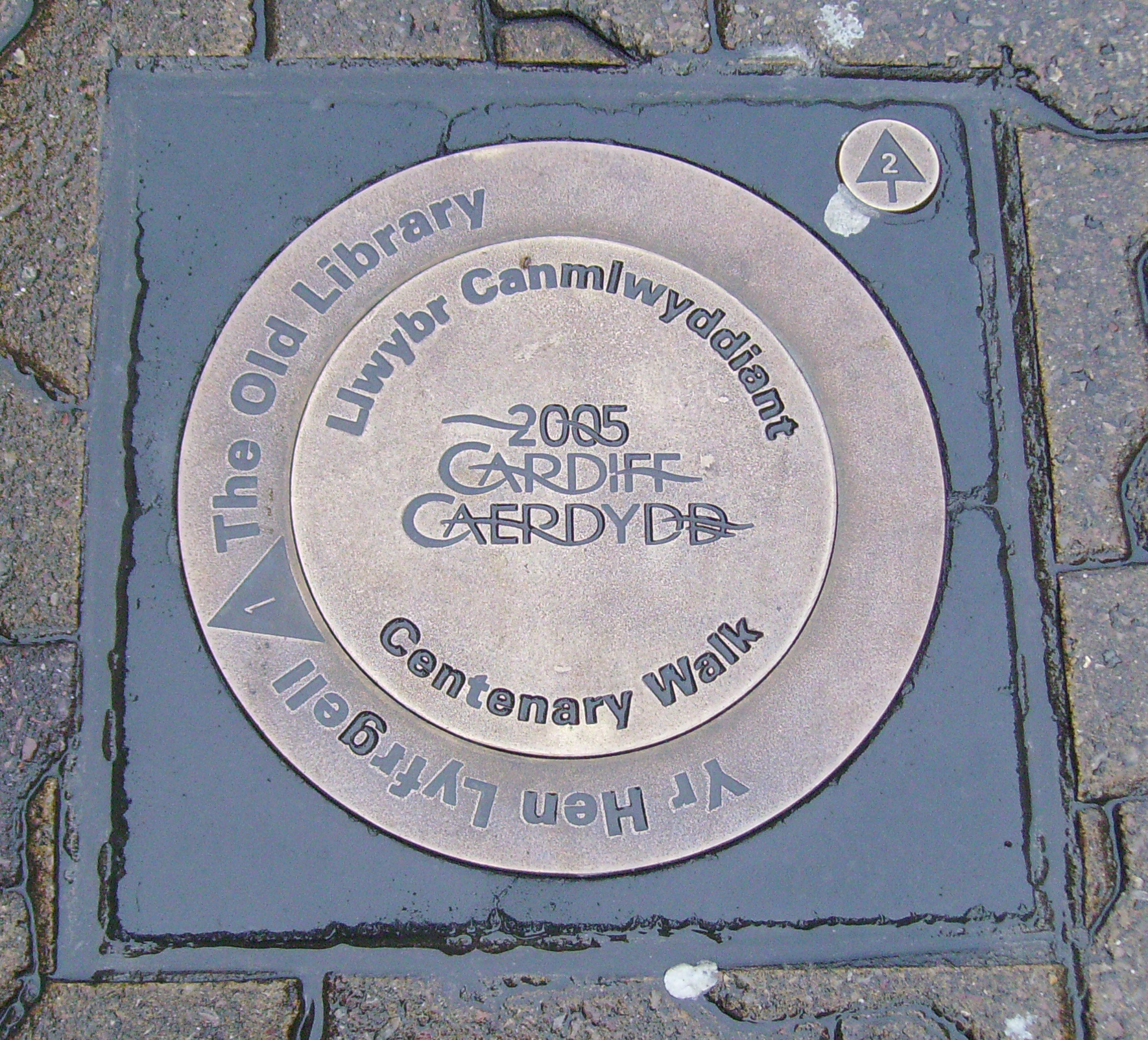
The first waymarker at the Old Library

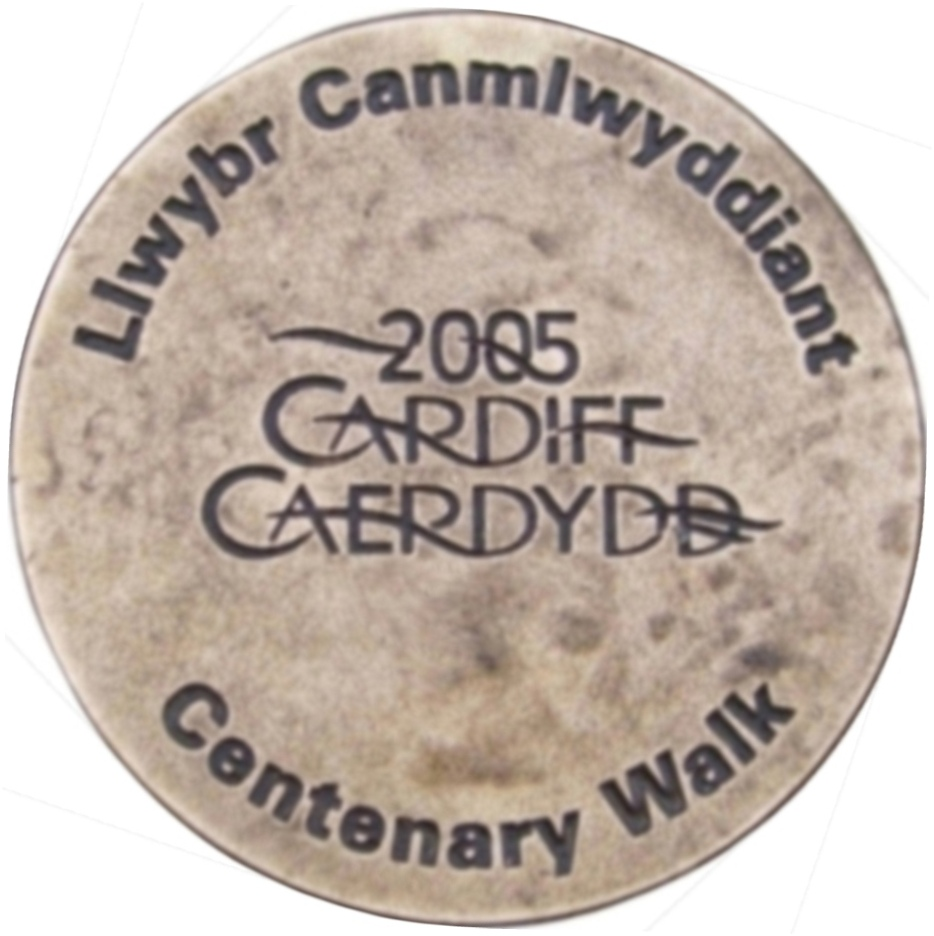
Waymarker on the Cardiff Centenary Walk

The Cardiff Centenary Walk is a tourist walkway through Cardiff city centre in Wales. Established as part of Cardiff's centennial celebrations to mark 100 years of city status in 2005, it has 41 points of interest, either Cardiff landmarks or significant historic sites. The route is marked by waymarkers on the pavement, which also direct pedestrians to the next waymarker. The whole walk is 3.6 kilometres (2.2 mi) long running around Cardiff in a clockwise direction, starting and finishing at the Cardiff Visitor Centre at the Old Library.

== Waymarkers numbers ==
1. Old Library
2. Cardiff Market
3. St John the Baptist Church
4. St. Mary Street/High Street
5. Quay Street
6. Womanby Street
7. Millennium Stadium
8. Angel Hotel
9. Animal Wall
10. West Gate
11. Castle Arcade
12. Cardiff Castle
13. Duke Street Arcade
14. Aneurin Bevan Statue
15. East Gate
16. The Friary
17. Friary Gardens
18. Dock Feeder
19. City Hall
20. Law Courts
21. University of Wales Registry
22. Glamorgan Building
23. Bute Building
24. Falklands Memorial
25. Welsh National War Memorial
26. Cardiff University
27. National Museum Cardiff
28. Gorsedd Gardens
29. Park House
30. New Theatre
31. Park Hotel
32. St David's Cathedral
33. Town Wall
34. The Fish Market
35. Tabernacl Chapel
36. Mill Lane
37. The Old Brewery
38. Royal Arcade
39. Morgan Arcade
40. Howells
41. The Hayes
