= Caroline Street (Cardiff) =

Pedestrian street in Cardiff, Wales

- Chip Alley or Chippy Lane
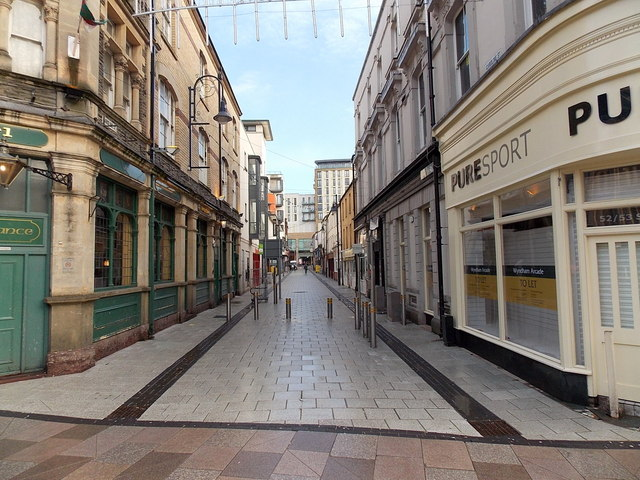
- Interactive map of Caroline Street
- Length: 200 m (660 ft)
- Location: Cardiff, Wales
- Coordinates: 51°28′40.35″N 3°10′35.27″W
- North: Old Brewery Quarter
- East: St. Mary's Street
- West: The Hayes

Caroline Street (Welsh: Stryd Caroline) is a pedestrianised street running east–west in the lower part of Cardiff city centre, located between The Hayes and St. Mary's Street. Due to the density of fast food shops along the street, it is colloquially referred to as Chip Alley, or Chippy Lane.

== History ==
Located within the original town walls of Cardiff, and just south of the original Cardiff Gaol, much as though its modern form caters for the eating needs of the public, a number of buildings in Caroline Street have listed building status. Caroline Street was renamed in the Victorian era after Caroline of Brunswick, the wife of King George IV. The next street south is Charlotte Street, named after their daughter Princess Charlotte of Wales. In 1857, the same year that the last public execution took place in Cardiff, records show that 150 died as a result of an outbreak of smallpox on Caroline Street.

In 2003 Caroline Street was refurbished, with pedestrianisation and a stone based easy-clean finish.

== Chippy Lane ==
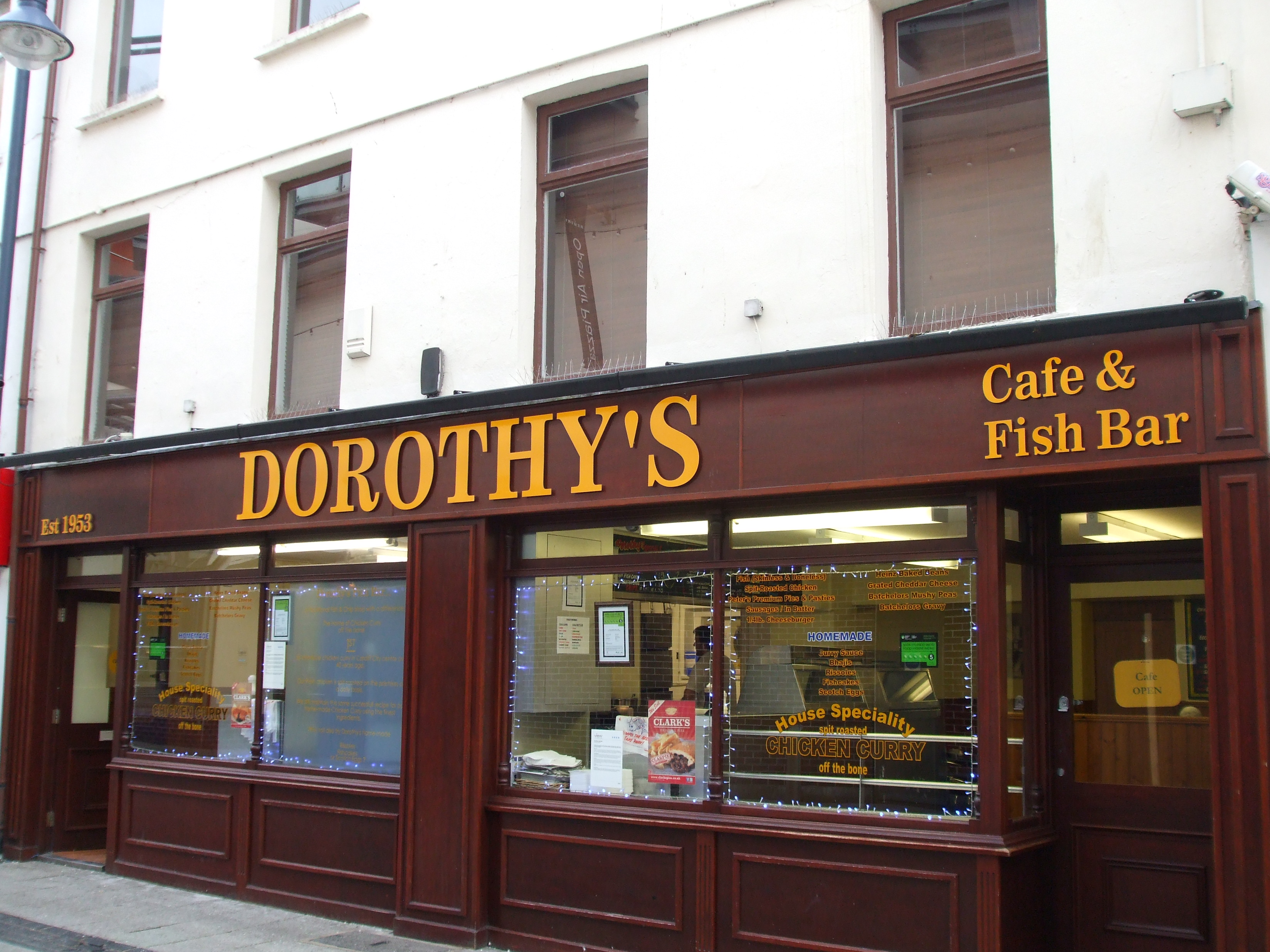
Dorothy's Cafe & Fish Bar on Caroline Street, established 1953

Up until the post-World War II period, the street was a traditional mixed-trading street, with occupants including butchers and cobblers.

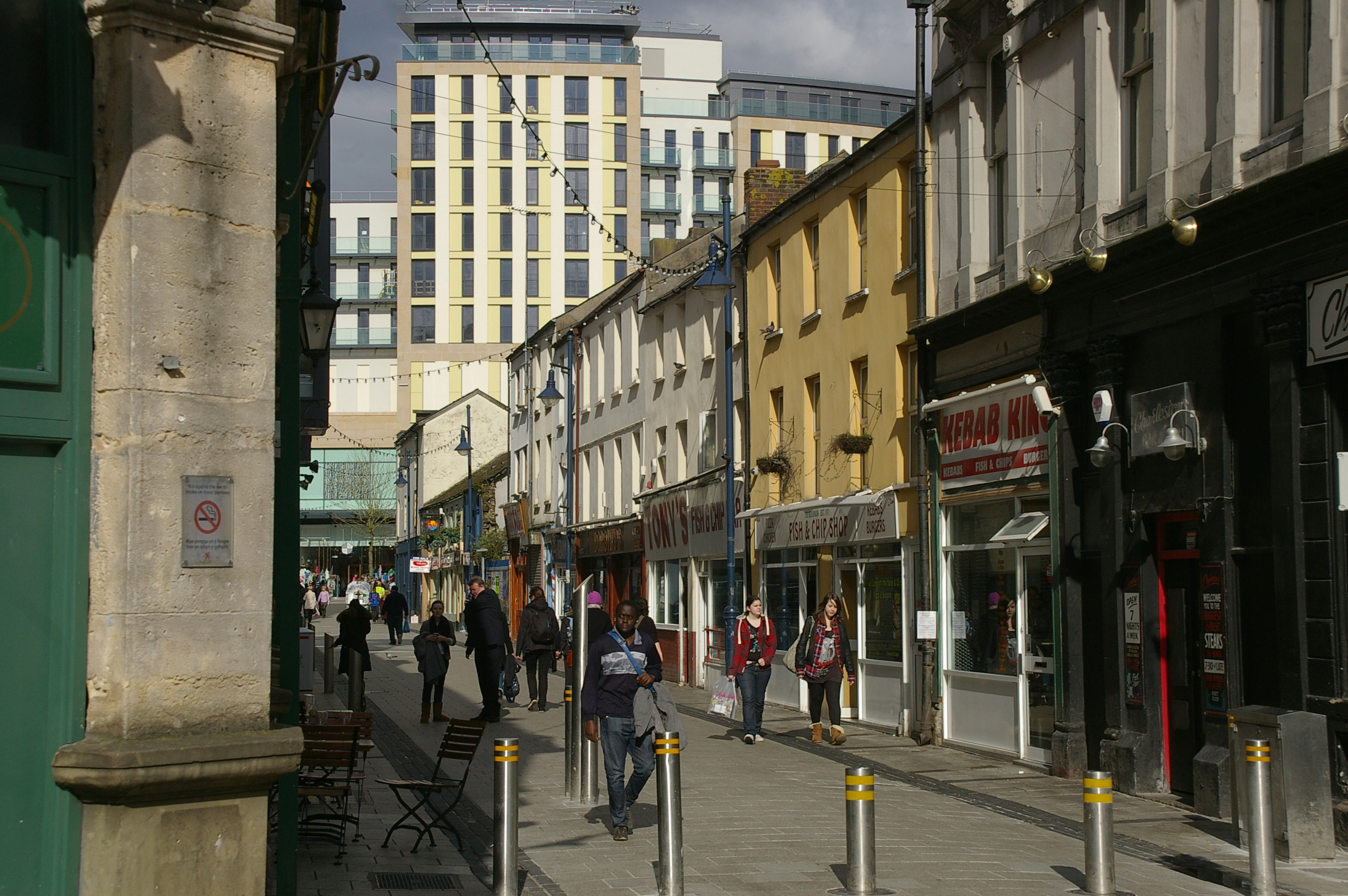
Fast food shops in Caroline Street

Since that time, the number of family- and privately owned fast food outlets has steadily increased and, as of 2011, only a single outlet for Greggs bakery was resident on the Hayes end of the street.

As of 2019 Caroline Street had three traditional fish and chip shops, Dorothy's, Tony's and Hak's. There were three kebab shops and a Mexican 'Tortilla' outlet. A Five Guys burger restaurant was located in the middle of the street, opposite a Bistro Pierre and a Spice Quarter restaurants. At either end of the street were pubs, the Corner House and the Cambrian Tap.

Dorothy's claims to be the oldest resident fast food shop on Caroline Street, which is a fish and chip shop. The favourite fare served by all shops includes the preferred South Wales delicacy of curry sauce and chips.

== Reputation ==
Such is the reputation of Caroline Street amongst local residents and numerous university students, that it is normally a riotous but well-behaved location, with premises staying open until past 2:00 am on Friday and Saturday nights. In 2010 the licensing officer for South Wales Police described Caroline Street as "a honey pot for anti-social behaviour. There are a lot of late night incidents in the area... During the peak period between 11pm–4am this area is a hotspot for crime."

Prominent incidents occasionally occur, such as in January 2011 when the then Cardiff City F.C. footballer Craig Bellamy was arrested and bailed on an alleged assault claim, in which two men suffered facial injuries.

The street's reputation is referenced in an episode of the sitcom Gavin & Stacey.

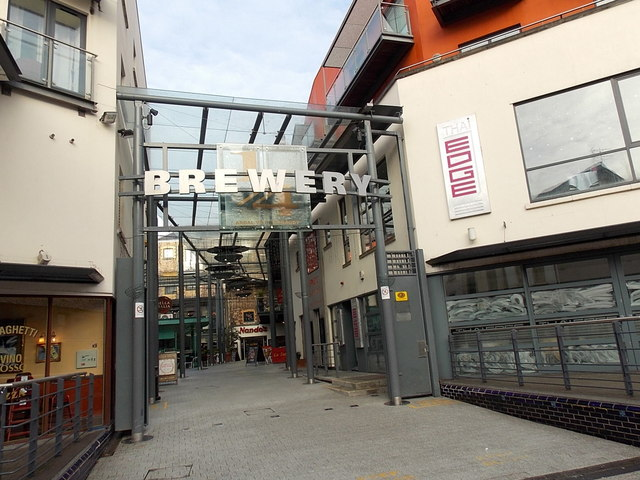
Entrance to the Brewery Quarter on Caroline Street
