= James Milo Griffith =

Welsh sculptor (1843–1897)

James Milo Griffiths
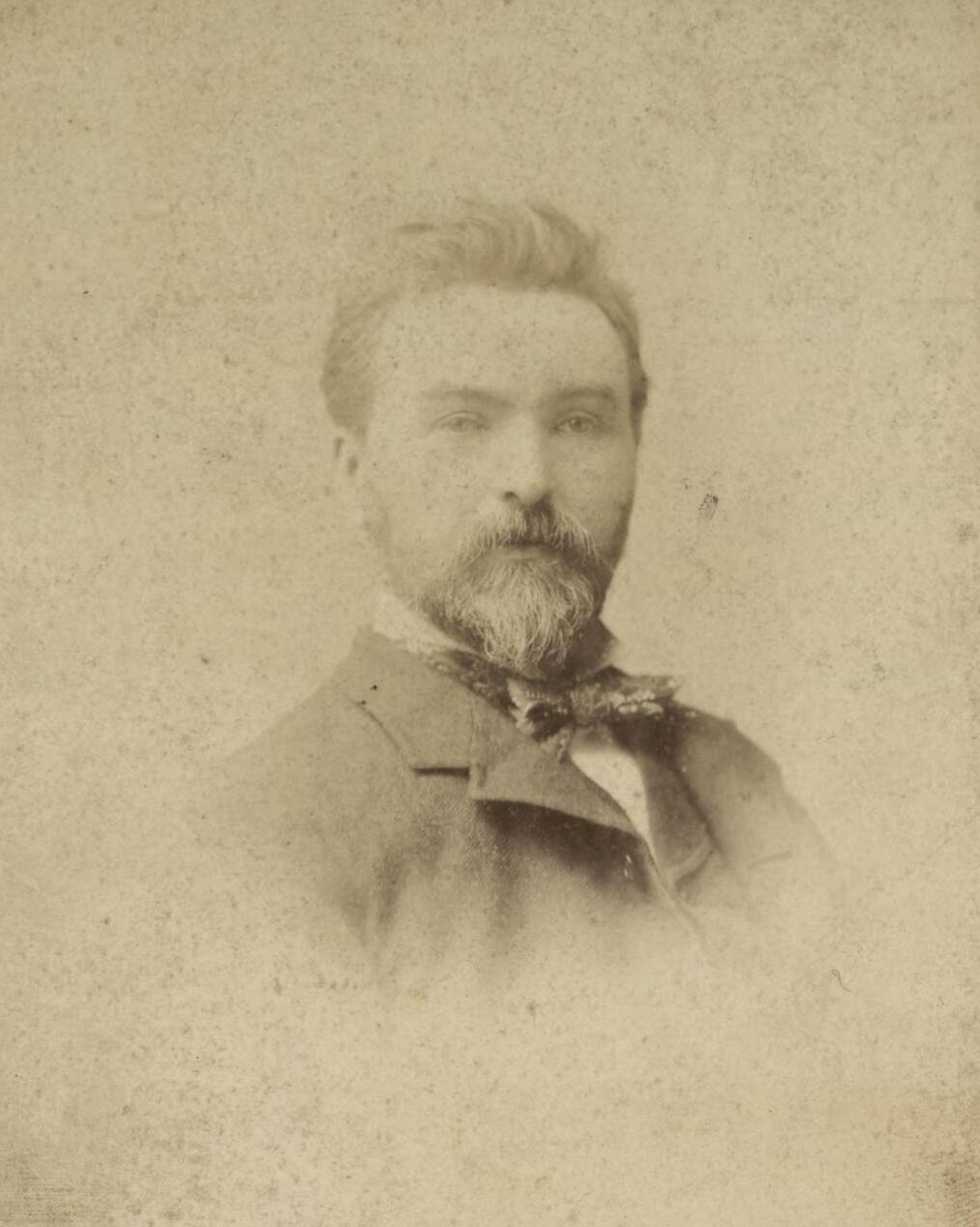
- Born: 11 June 1843; Pont-seli, Wales
- Died: 8 September 1897 (aged 54); London, England
- Education: Royal Academy Schools
- Known for: Sculpture

James Milo Griffith (11 June 1843 – 8 September 1897) was a Welsh sculptor who, after originally training as an artisan mason, became notable for his memorial statues.

== Life ==
Griffith was born in Pont-seli, Pembrokeshire, in 1843. During the restoration of Llandaff Cathedral, undertaken by the Welsh architect John Prichard, Griffith was apprenticed by the Bishop of Llandaff as an artisan stonemason. At the age of twenty, Griffith was admitted to Royal Academy Schools in London.

Griffith produced several works placed on public view, notably on the Holborn Viaduct and Bristol Cathedral. Among other notable works are the Statue of John Batchelor in Cardiff, that of Sir Hugh Owen in Caernarfon, and the Sabrina fountain in the grounds of Bridgnorth Castle, Shropshire. In 1875 his work Summer Flowers was bought by Christopher Rice Mansel Talbot and displayed at Margam Castle. Griffith later moved the United States and became a professor of arts in San Francisco. He returned to London in 1896 and died there in 1897. He was buried in the suburb of Morden.

== Gallery ==
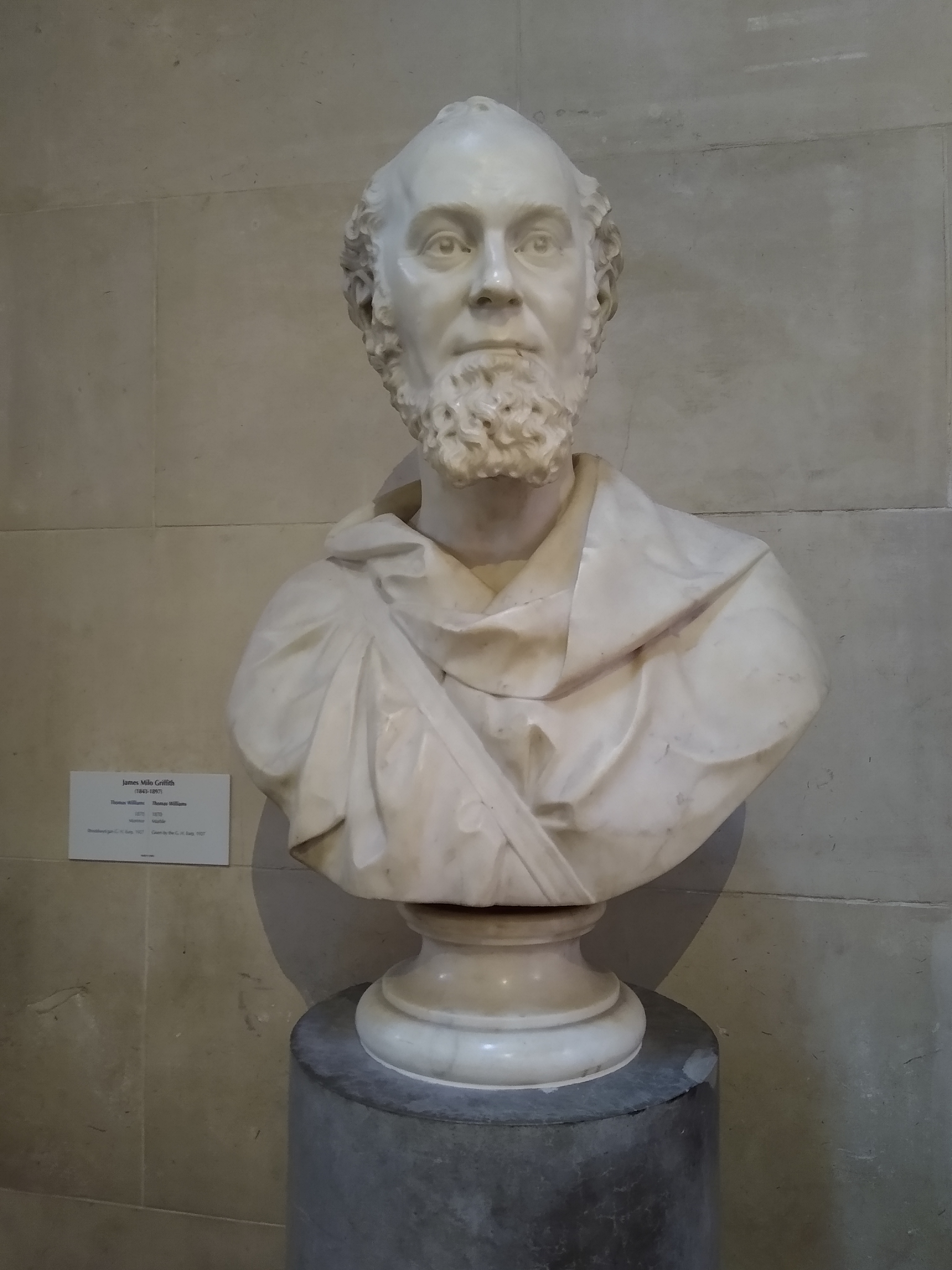
A bust by James Milo Griffith displayed at National Museum Cardiff

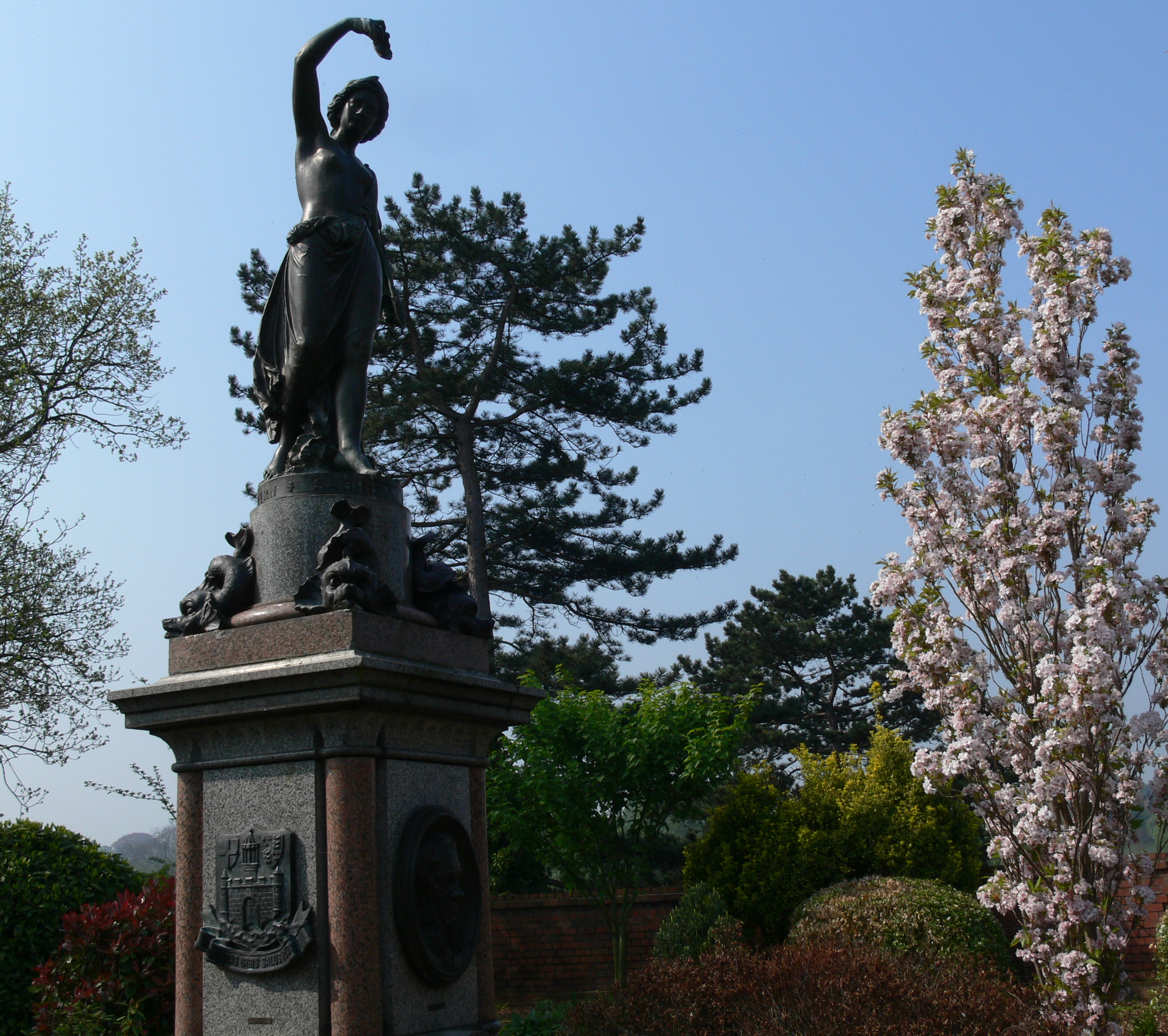
Statue of Sabrina in the grounds of Bridgnorth Castle, Shropshire

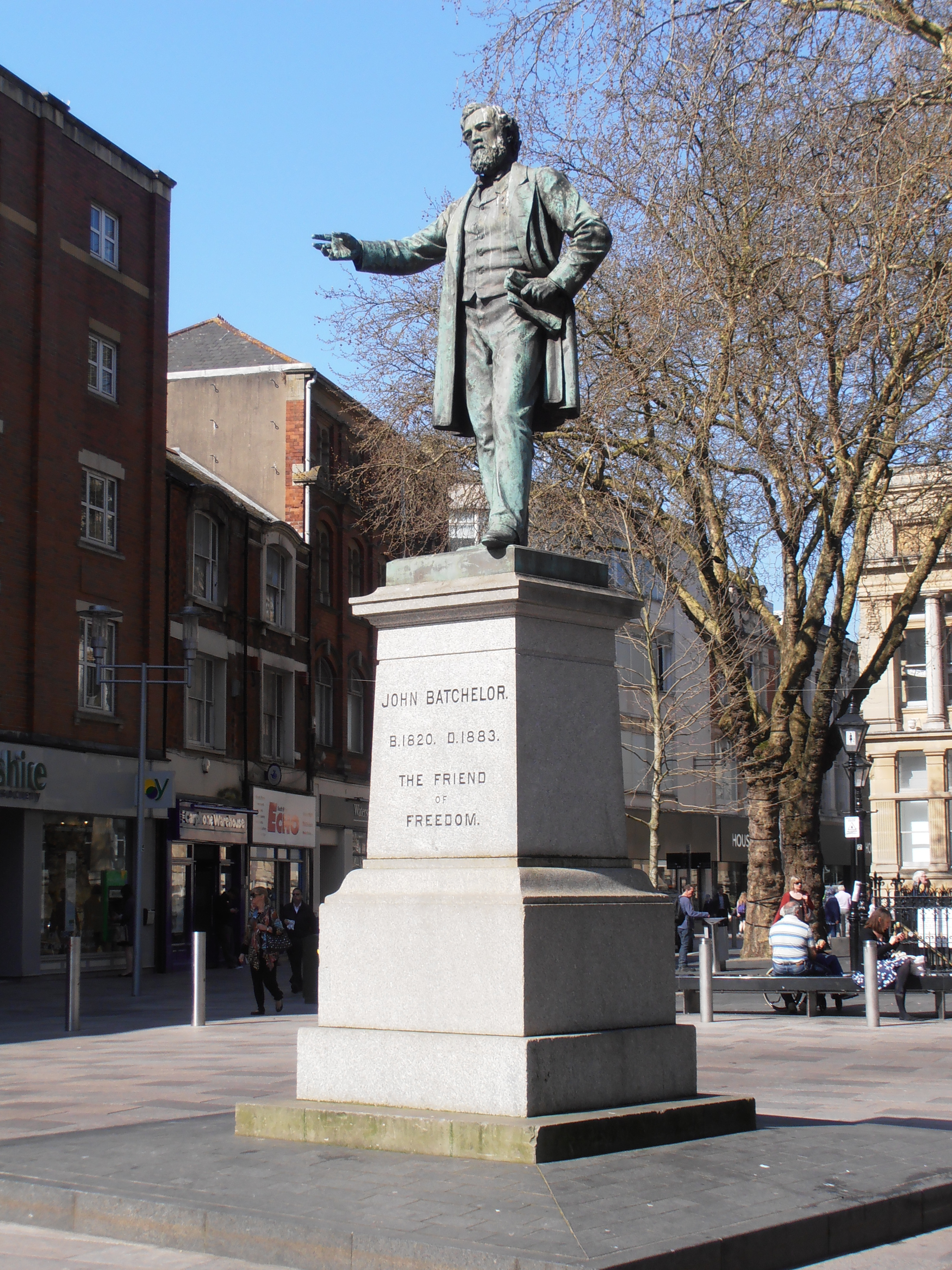
Statue of John Batchelor in The Hayes, Cardiff
