= Cardiff power stations =

Former coal-fired power stations in Wales

- Country: Wales
- Location: Cardiff
- Coordinates: 51°29′42″N 03°08′45″W
- Status: Decommissioned and demolished
- Construction began: 1891
- Commission date: 1894
- Decommission date: 1970
- Owners: Cardiff Corporation (1894–1948); British Electricity Authority (1948–1955); Central Electricity Authority (1955–1957); Central Electricity Generating Board (1958–1970)
- Operator: As owner

Thermal power station
- Primary fuel: Coal
- Turbine technology: Steam turbines and steam reciprocating engines
- Chimneys: 2
- Cooling towers: 2
- Cooling source: Cooling pond, river and cooling towers

Power generation
- Units operational: 3 x 5 MW, 1 x 12.5 MW, 2 x 30 MW
- Make and model: British Thomson-Houston, Fraser & Chalmers, Metropolitan-Vickers
- Nameplate capacity: 83 MW
- Annual net output: 384.68 GWH (1946)

The Cardiff power stations supplied electricity to the City of Cardiff and the surrounding area from 1894 to about 1970. The original power station was in Riverside; a larger replacement station was built in Roath in the 1902, initially to supply the tramway system. They were both owned and operated by Cardiff Corporation prior to the nationalisation of the British electricity supply industry in 1948. The Roath power station was redeveloped in the 1920s and 1940s to meet the increased demand for electricity.

== History ==
In 1891 Cardiff Corporation applied for a provisional order under the Electric Lighting Acts to generate and supply electricity to the city. The Cardiff Electric Lighting Order 1891 was granted by the Board of Trade and was confirmed by Parliament through the Electric Lighting Orders Confirmation (No. 8) Act 1891 (54 & 55 Vict. c. civ). The original power station was built on Eldon Road, Riverside (51°28′40″N 03°11′58″W) and it first supplied electricity in 1894. Further equipment was added to meet the rising demand for electricity; by the 1920s it had a generating capacity of 900 kW.

A larger power station was built in Roath (51°29′42″N 03°08′45″W). This was initially intended to supply Cardiff Corporation Tramways from 1902; the tram depot was adjacent to the power station. The power station was expanded with new generating plant between 1922 and 1928 which was also known as the low pressure station. A high pressure plant was commissioned in 1942–43 bringing the generating capacity to 83 MW. The power station at Roath operated until about 1970.

== Equipment specification ==
The initial installation of plant at the Eldon Road site in 1894 comprised triple expansion and compound condensing engines coupled directly to Siemens and Ferranti dynamos. The plant had a rating of 740 kW.

The station was supplied with coal via a siding off the nearby South Wales Mainline railway.

Cooling of condenser water was by a cooling pond west of the power station building.

By 1922 the plant at Eldon Road comprised boilers delivering 24,000 lb/h (3.02 kg/s) of steam to 3 × 300 kW reciprocating engines generating alternating current.

=== Plant in 1923 ===
By 1923 the generating plant at the Roath station comprised:

- Coal-fired boilers generating up to 241,000 lb/h (30.36 kg/s) of steam at 150 psi which was supplied to:
- Generators:
  - 2 × 300 kW reciprocating engines with DC generators (initial installation)
  - 2 × 900 kW reciprocating engines with DC generators
  - 1 × 1,000 kW reciprocating engine with AC generator
  - 3 × 2,000 kW steam turbo-alternators AC (installed in 1909, 1914 and 1917)
  - 1 × 5,000 kW steam turbo-alternators AC.

These machines gave a total generating capacity of 14,400 kW comprising 12,000 kW of alternating current (AC) plus 2,400 kW of direct current (DC).

Electricity supplies to consumers were:

- 6,600 Volts, 3-phase, 50 Hz AC
- 400 & 200 Volts, single phase, 40 Hz AC
- 400 & 200 Volts DC
- 550 Volts DC Traction current.

=== Plant in 1924–28 ===
New plant was commissioned at Roath in 1924, 1925 and 1928. This comprised:

- Boilers:
  - 7 × Babcock & Wilcox 40,000 lb/h (5.04 kg/s) boilers, steam conditions 210 psi and 594°F (14.48 bar, 312°C), the boilers supplied steam to:
- Generators:
  - 3 × 5 MW British Thomson-Houston turbo-alternator, generating at 6.6 kV
  - 1 × 12.5 MW Fraser & Chalmers turbo-alternator, generating at 6.6 kV
  - 1 × 100 kW Bellis reciprocating engine house-service set, generating at 400 V.

=== Plant in 1942–43 ===
High pressure plant was installed at Roath in 1942–43 comprising:

- 4 × Babcock & Wilcox 180,000 lb/h (22.68 kg/s), steam conditions 620 psi and 870°F (42.76 bar, 466°C), they supplied steam to:
- 2 × 30 MW Metropolitan-Vickers turbo-alternators, generating at 33 kV.

The station was supplied with coal via a siding off the nearby South Wales Mainline railway.

Condenser cooling water was drawn from the River Rhymney, supplemented by two concrete cooling towers each with a capacity of 2.2 million gallons per hour (2.78 m^{3}/s). The towers were built in 1942 and were painted in camouflage.

== Operations ==
=== Operating data 1898 ===
- Electricity sold: public lamps 99,316 kWh, metered 209,114 kWh.
- No. of lamps on circuits: 14,136
- No. of Public lamps: 52
- Revenue from sales of electricity was £5,670; the cost of generation was £3,242.

=== Operating data 1921–23 ===
The electricity supply data for the period 1921–23 was:

Cardiff power station supply data 1921–23
Electricity Use	Units	Year		
Electricity Use	Units	1921	1922	1923
Lighting and domestic	MWh	5,775	6,165	7,580
Public lighting	MWh	627	658	642
Traction	MWh	4,789	4,659	4,568
Power	MWh	4,206	5,127	7,245
Bulk supply	MWh	14	17	7
Total use	MWh	15,412	16,627	20,040

Electricity Loads on the system were:

Maximum load	kW	1921	1922	1923
Maximum load	kW	8,720	9,798	10,435
Total connections	kW	22,412	26,925	32,664
Load factor	Per cent	26.3	26.3	28.4

Revenue from sales of current (in 1923) was £175,403; the surplus of revenue over expenses (1923) was £98,169.

=== Operating data 1946 ===
Cardiff power station operating data for 1946 is:

Load factor per cent	Max output load MW	Electricity supplied MWh	Thermal efficiency per cent
53.3	82,448	384,679	19.96

The British electricity supply industry was nationalised in 1948 under the provisions of the Electricity Act 1947 (10 & 11 Geo. 6 c. 54). The Cardiff electricity undertaking was abolished, ownership of Cardiff power station was vested in the British Electricity Authority, and subsequently the Central Electricity Authority and the Central Electricity Generating Board (CEGB). At the same time the electricity distribution and sales responsibilities of the Cardiff electricity undertaking were transferred to the South Wales Electricity Board (SWEB).

=== Operating data 1954–67 ===
Operating data for the period 1954–67 was:

Cardiff power station operating data, 1954–67
Year	Running hours or load factor (per cent)	Max output capacity MW	Electricity supplied GWh	Thermal efficiency per cent
Low pressure
1954	3189	26	39.962	10.42
1955	2480	26	24.218	9.84
1956	2335	26	24.787	9.47
1957	1681	26	15.093	8.93
1958	1094	26	9.643	9.07
High pressure
1954	7007	57	236.691	20.99
1955	5874	57	232.811	21.12
1956	6109	57	233.354	20.05
1957	5546	57	173.721	19.49
1958	3933	57	72.813	18.62
Total output
1961	22.6 %	83	163.987	18.28
1962	18.1 %	75	128.430	16.53
1963	17.37 %	75	114.091	16.52
1967	9.6 %	75	53.947	15.57

Output from the stations in MWh

== Cardiff supply district ==
Following nationalisation Cardiff became an electricity supply district, covering 80.9 square miles (209.5 km^{2}) with a population of 283,040 in 1958. The number of consumers and electricity sold in the Cardiff district was:

Year	1956	1957	1958
Number of consumers	87,236	89,040	90,837
Electricity sold MWh	487,251	483,462	90,837

In 1958 the number of units sold to categories of consumers was:

Electricity sold to consumers
Type of consumer	No. of consumers	Electricity sold MWh
Domestic	80,493	128,159
Farms	346	2,341
Commercial	8,804	75,568
Industrial	1,186	289,342
Public lighting	7	5.182
Traction	1	8,662
Total	90,837	509,254

== Closure ==
Cardiff power station (Roath) was decommissioned in about 1970. The buildings were demolished in 1972 and the area has been redeveloped with commercial premises.

== See also ==
- Timeline of the UK electricity supply industry
- List of power stations in Wales
