= Cardiff Corporation Tramways =

Defunct tramway company in Cardiff, Wales

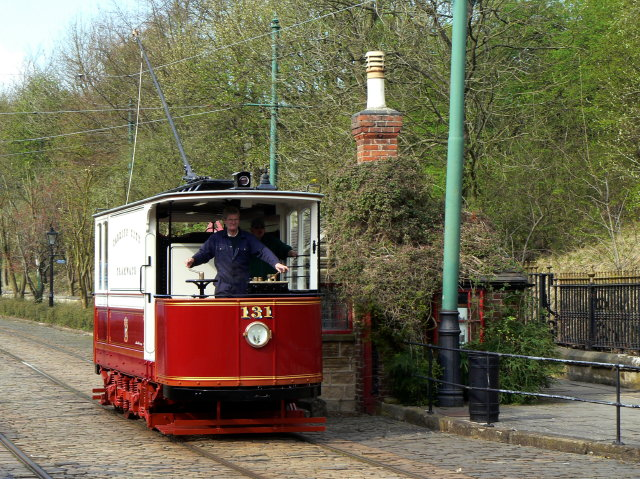
- Cardiff Corporation Tramways water car 131 preserved in the National Tramway Museum

Operation
- Locale: Cardiff
- Open: 1 May 1902
- Close: 19 January 1950
- Status: Closed

Infrastructure
- Track gauge: 4 ft 8 1/2 in (1,435 mm)
- Propulsion system: Electric

Statistics
- Route length: 19.51 miles (31.40 km)

Cardiff Corporation Tramways was a company that operated an electric tramway service in Cardiff between 1902 and 1950.

== History ==
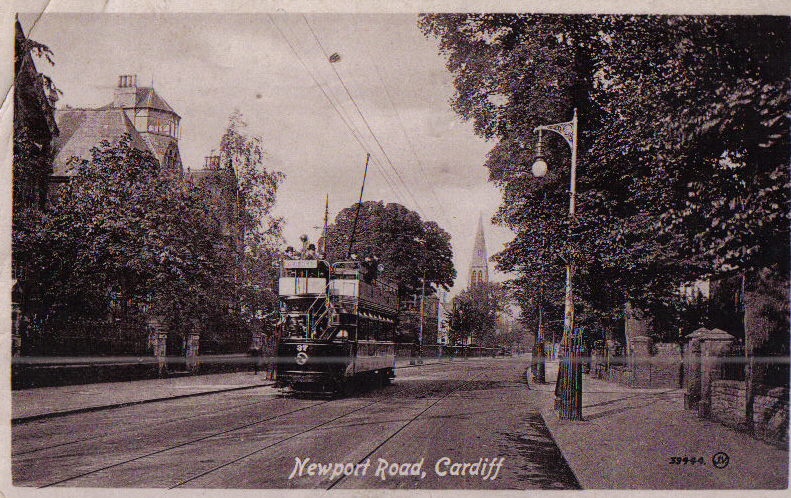
Tram 37 on Newport Road, Cardiff, c. 1912

Horse trams had run in the city from 1872 until 1904. The first tram route ran from High Street in the city centre to the Docks run by the Cardiff Tramway Company. In 1898, Cardiff County Borough Council obtained an act of Parliament, the Cardiff Corporation Act 1898 (61 & 62 Vict. c. cxxviii) giving powers to take over all the tramways in the area, and to use new electric trams, owning them from 1903. The routes formally opened on 1 May 1902. Electricity was supplied from the Cardiff power station at Roath adjacent to the tram depot.

In 1904, more than 23 million passengers had been carried in that year, up from 18 million the previous year. and when Cardiff became a city in 1905, 131 electric trams were operating on the network, mainly focusing on the busy Cardiff Docks. The corporation also operated a city-wide parcel delivery service. The Hayes Island Snack Bar was built in 1911 as the main parcel depot and functioned until closure in 1942.

In 1928, the network peaked at 142 cars and 19.51 miles (31.3 km) route miles. Traffic and receipts were buoyant; during the year ending 31 March 1928 passengers totalled 42,440,000 with receipts of £265,028. Car miles had reached 3,490,000.

By 1929, the tram network stretched from Victoria Park in the west, to Grangetown and Cardiff Docks in the south, to Roath and Splott in the east, and to Gabalfa in the north.

The city council refused motor buses in 1907 but allowed them in 1910, operating its own from 1920, although 81 tramcars were introduced by Cardiff Corporation Transport to negotiate the city's low railway bridges. By 1939, these vehicles were becoming worn out and it was decided to phase out tramcars.

From 1902 until 1943, conductors on each tram collected fares but this was later replaced with a pay-as-you-enter system, with fares costing 1d.

== Closure ==
The system was closed on 20 January 1950, when electric trams were replaced with electric trolleybuses.

== Heath Park Electric Tramway ==
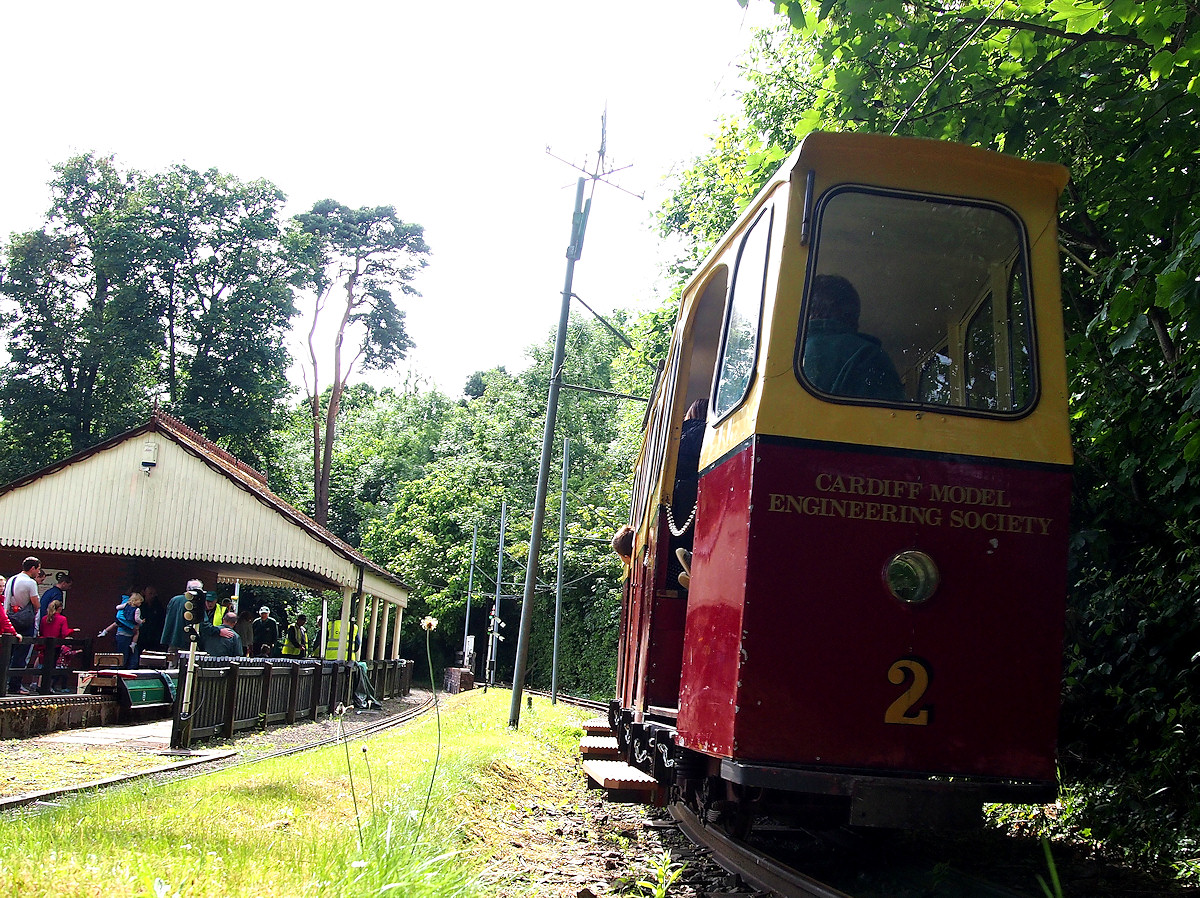
Heath Park Tramway

A short 18 in (457 mm) gauge tramway and electric trams were built by members of Cardiff Model Engineering Society (including a former employee of Cardiff Corporation Tramways). The trams run on a 200 m (220 yd) track at the Society's grounds in Heath Park, where visitors can ride the tram.
