= Old Brewery Quarter =

Mixed-use development in Cardiff, Wales

Coordinates: 51°28′43.18″N 3°10′37.64″W

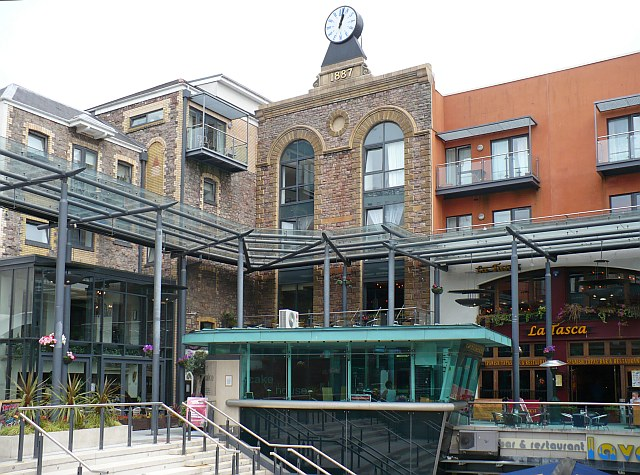
View of the Old Brewery Quarter, showing the old brewery clock on the redeveloped 1887 premises

The Old Brewery Quarter, also known simply as the Brewery Quarter or the Brewery ¼, is a modern mixed-use development in the centre of Cardiff, Wales, on the site of the original Brains Brewery, with entrances on St. Mary's Street and Caroline Street.

== Background ==
Samuel Arther Brain bought the site in 1882, which was already known as the "Old Brewery", the first brewery on the site dating back to 1713. The site included a pub, The Albert.

== Redevelopment ==
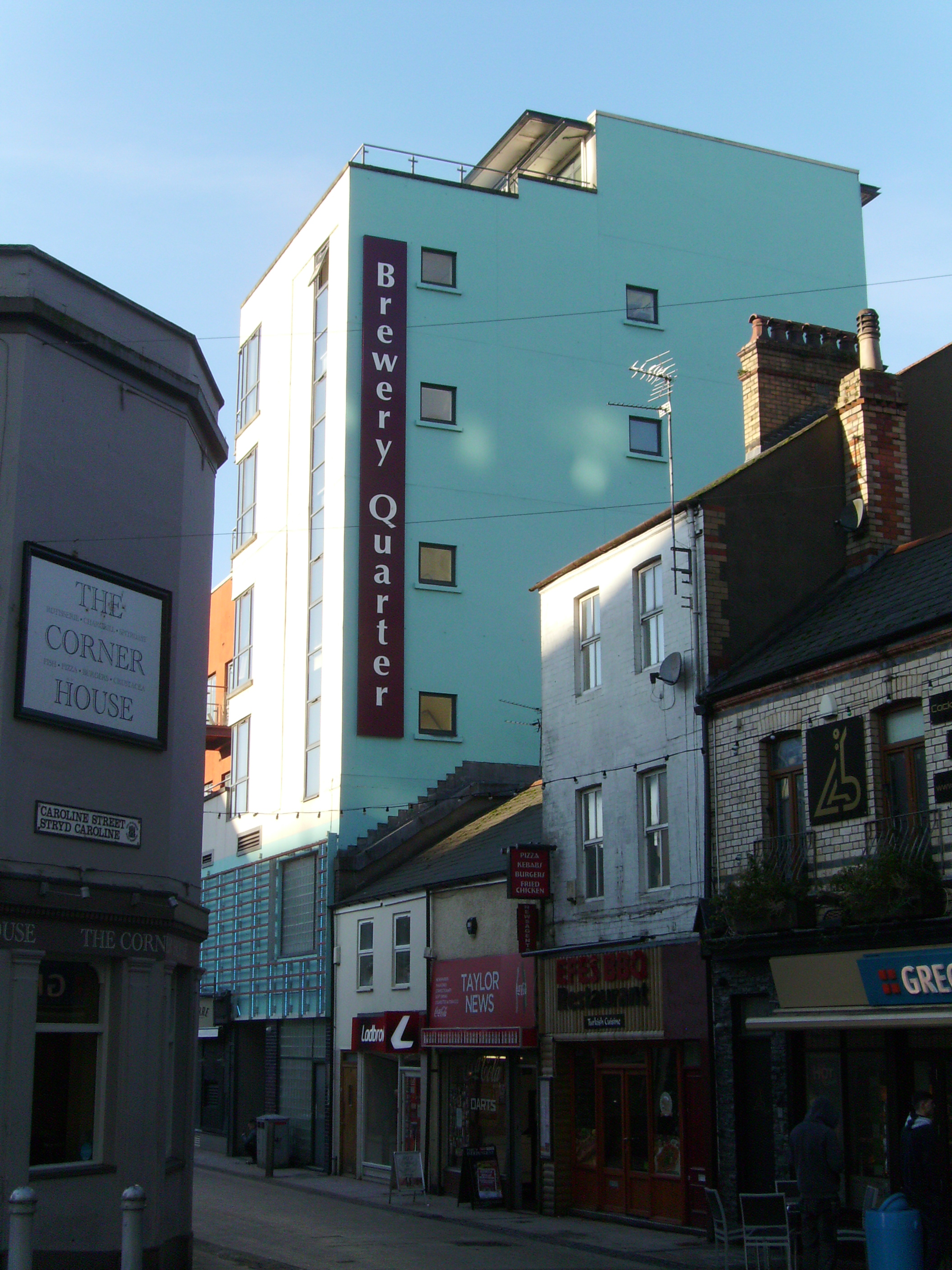
Brewery Quarter apartments on Caroline Street

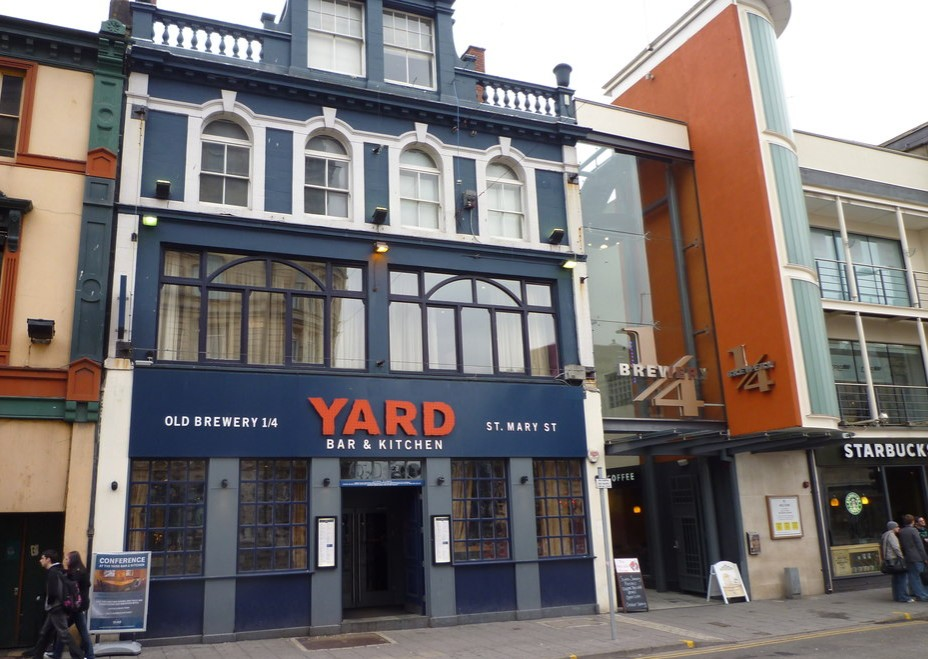
The Yard Bar and Kitchen, previously known as the Albert

Despite an expansion in the 1980s, the site became too small for the brewery, and in 1999 Brains vacated the Old Brewery to take over the larger Cardiff Brewery. The Old Brewery site was redeveloped, a joint venture between SA Brain & Co and Countryside Properties (though Brains later bought out their partner), with the new area opening in October 2003.

The 85,000 sq ft (7,900 m^{2}) "Old Brewery Quarter" consisted of a Brains pub, the 'Yard Bar and Kitchen' (formerly The Albert) and a mixed development of 55,000 sq ft (5,100 m^{2}) of food outlets around an open-air piazza with 42 long-leasehold loft style apartments and penthouses and office space for small companies. The development has attracted a range of bar and restaurant operators including Starbucks, Nandos, Thai Edge, Pancake House, La Tasca, and Chiquito.
