= Statue of John Batchelor =

Statue in Cardiff, Wales

Coordinates: 51.47954°N 3.17644°W

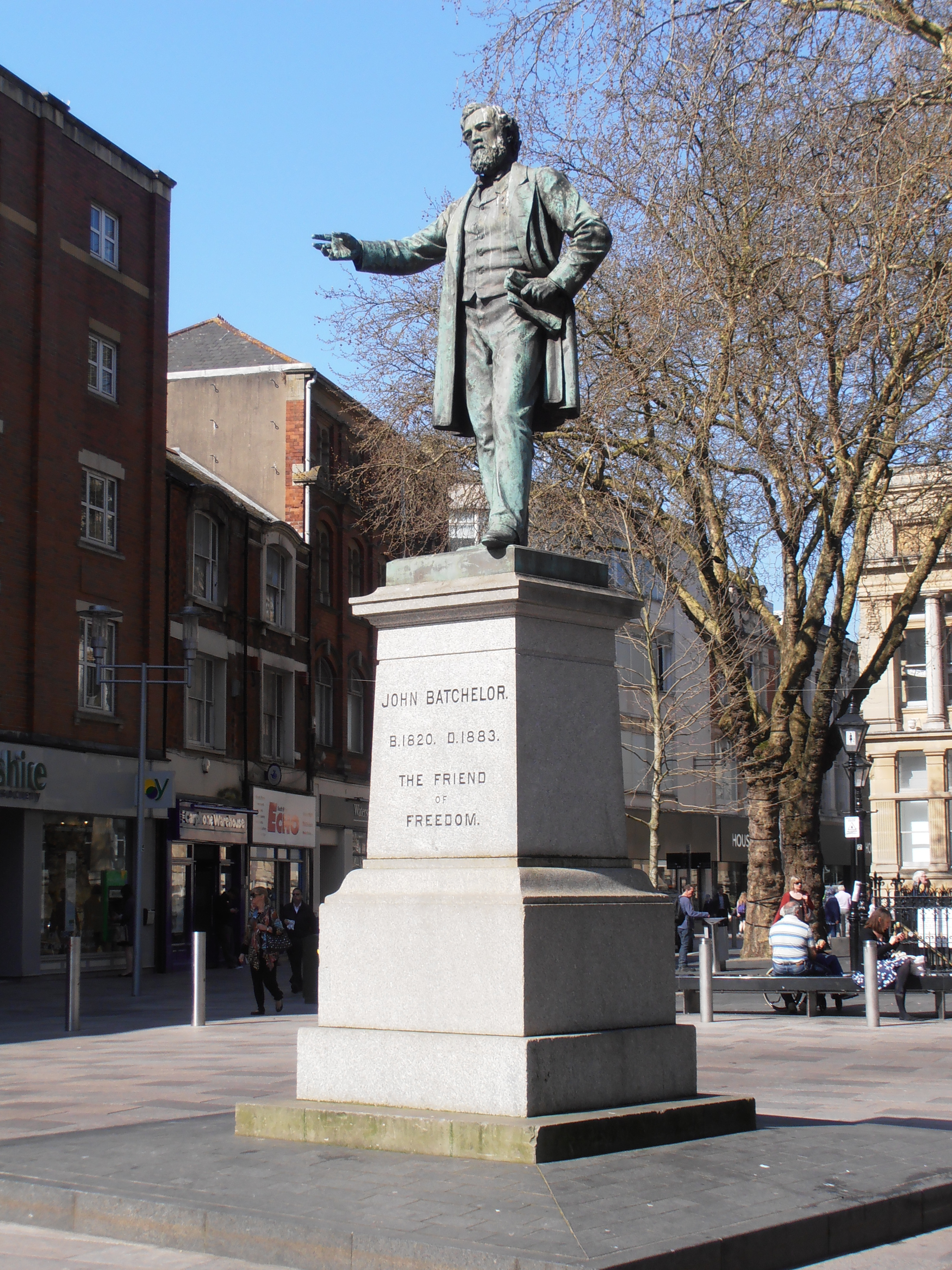
John Batchelor in The Hayes, Cardiff

A statue of John Batchelor stands in The Hayes, Cardiff, Wales in recognition of the businessman and Liberal politician, John Batchelor (1820 – 1883). The statue was erected in 1886.

The statue became Grade II listed in 1975.

== Background ==
John Batchelor was born in Newport, the son of a Congregationalist timber merchant and shipbuilder. He was apprenticed in ship building and set up in business with his brother in Cardiff. With his Liberal politics, Batchelor was a successful opponent of the dominant Marquesses of Bute in politics and business. He was an eloquent orator. Batchelor became a councillor and mayor of Cardiff when the Liberals took control of Cardiff Town Council in 1853. He helped bring a clean water supply and sewerage system to the town.

Batchelor's ship building business eventually failed after being impeded and undermined by the Bute Estate, who dominated Cardiff Docks. Local non-conformists raised £3,700 to support Batchelor. Batchelor promoted development of Penarth Docks, including proposals for a barrage across the River Taff (which the Butes also opposed). Batchelor retired as a broken man and died on 29 May 1883.

== Statue ==
Shortly after his death, £1,000 had been raised to raise a statue to John Batchelor. An application to site the memorial statue on The Hayes was approved by the Town Council in January 1885. The statue was designed by James Milo Griffith and was unveiled in The Hayes, Cardiff, on 16 October 1886, in a ceremony performed by prominent businessmen and Members of Parliament. The ceremony was arranged for a Saturday to allow Cardiff's working population to attend. The statue was poignantly located in front of Cardiff's Free Library, which Batchelor had campaigned for.

The statue is cast in bronze, Batchelor standing with one leg in front of the other and his right arm raised. The statue stands on a tall stone pedestal with the words "The Friend of Freedom" written on the front. The statue is 2.89 metres (9.5 ft) high and the pedestal is 2.44 metres (8.0 ft) in height. Batchelor's relatives were said to approve of the likeness. The statue was originally much closer to the library than it is today.

Within a few months of its unveiling the local Conservatives had launched a campaign to remove the statue. A petition was rejected by the Town Council but, all the same, Conservative William Thorn defaced the statue with yellow paint and tar. It was defaced for a third time, with red and blue paint, in January 1887. Conservative solicitor, T. H. Ensor, wrote a scathing piece in the Western Mail, suggesting the words "Friend of Freedom" be replaced with "traitor to the Crown... hater of the clergy... sincerely mourned by unpaid creditors". He was sued unsuccessfully for libel.

In 2010 Conservative member of the Welsh Assembly, David Melding, argued that the statue should be moved elsewhere, replaced by someone of national rather than local importance in the centre of Cardiff, such as David Lloyd George. Russell Goodway of Cardiff Council responded by saying there were more important priorities than relocating statues.
