= Snack bar =

Inexpensive food counter

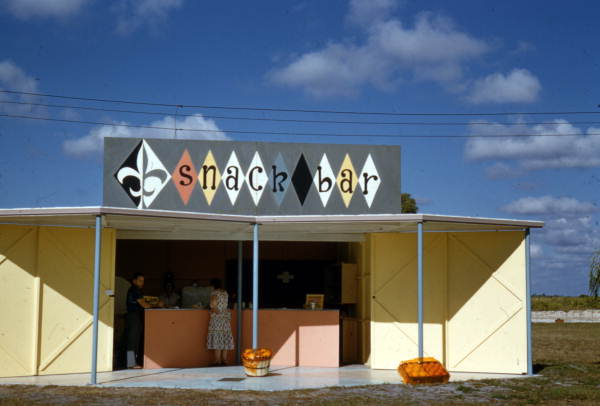
Snack bar at the Warm Mineral Springs attraction in North Port, Florida.

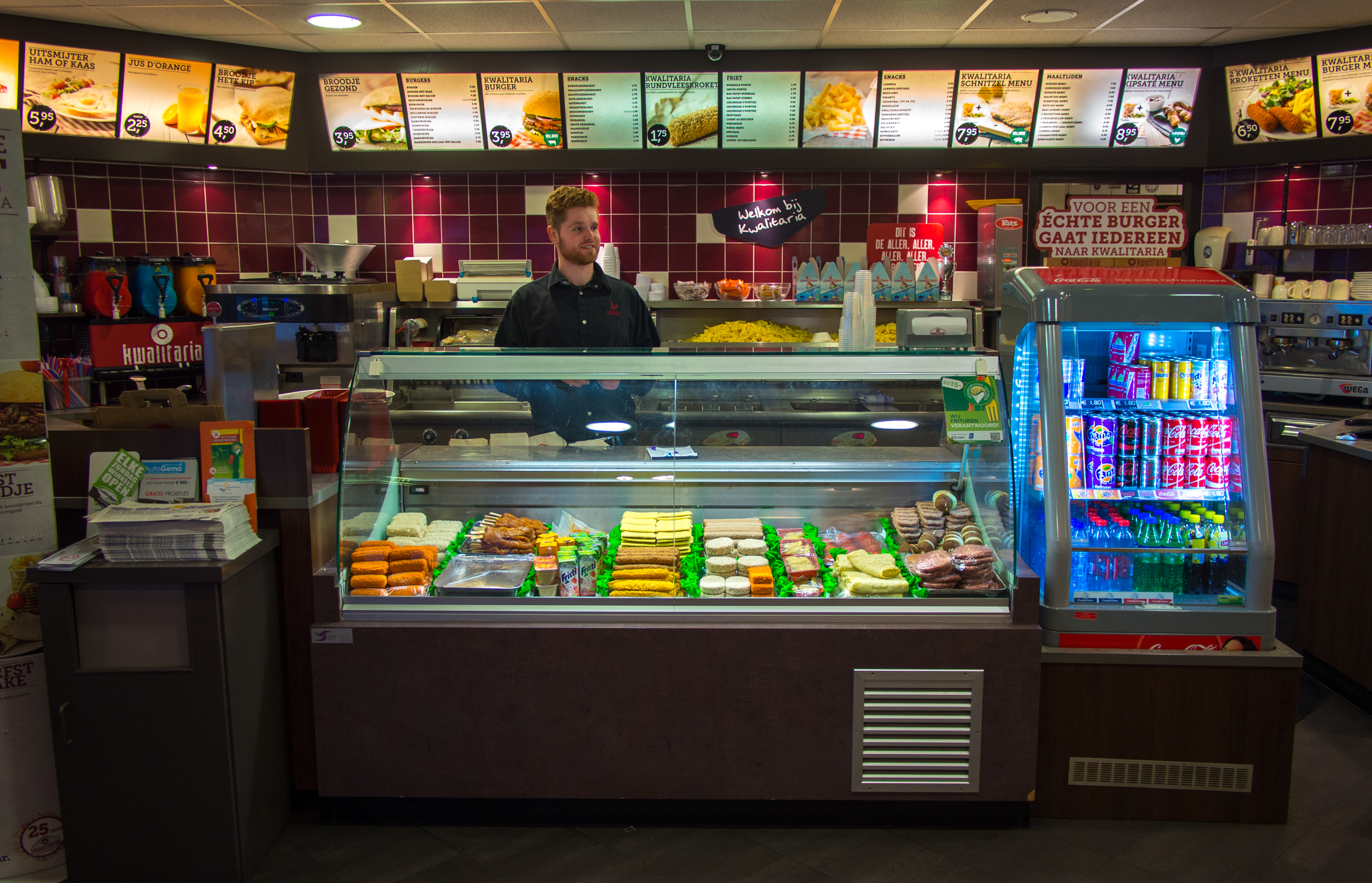
The interior of a snack bar in the Netherlands

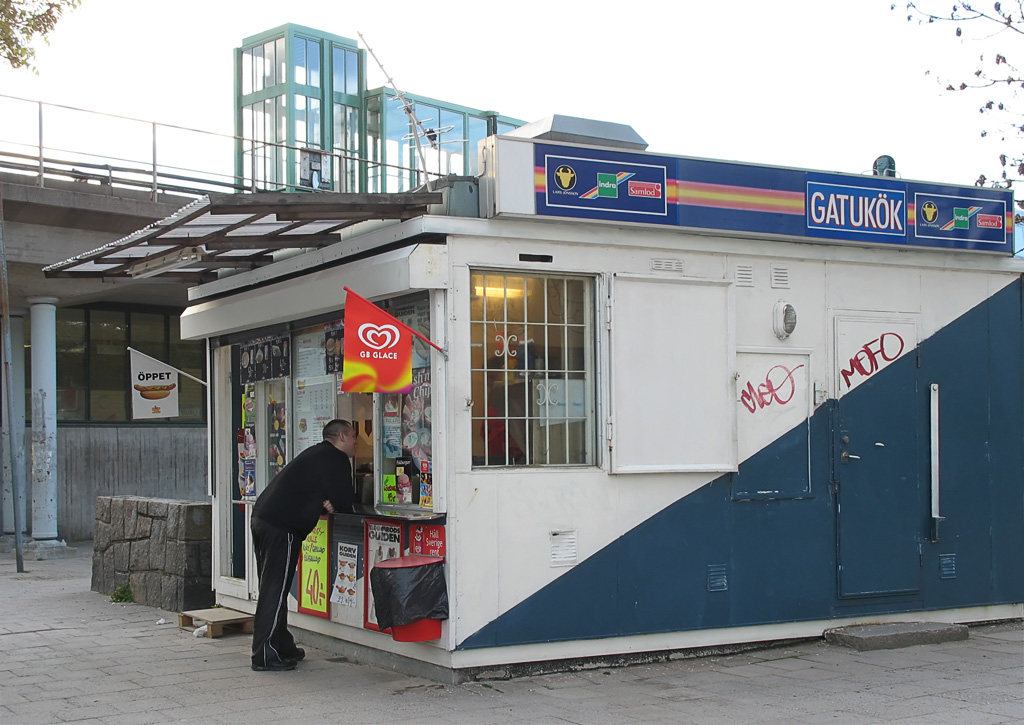
A snack bar in Bandhagen, Stockholm, Sweden

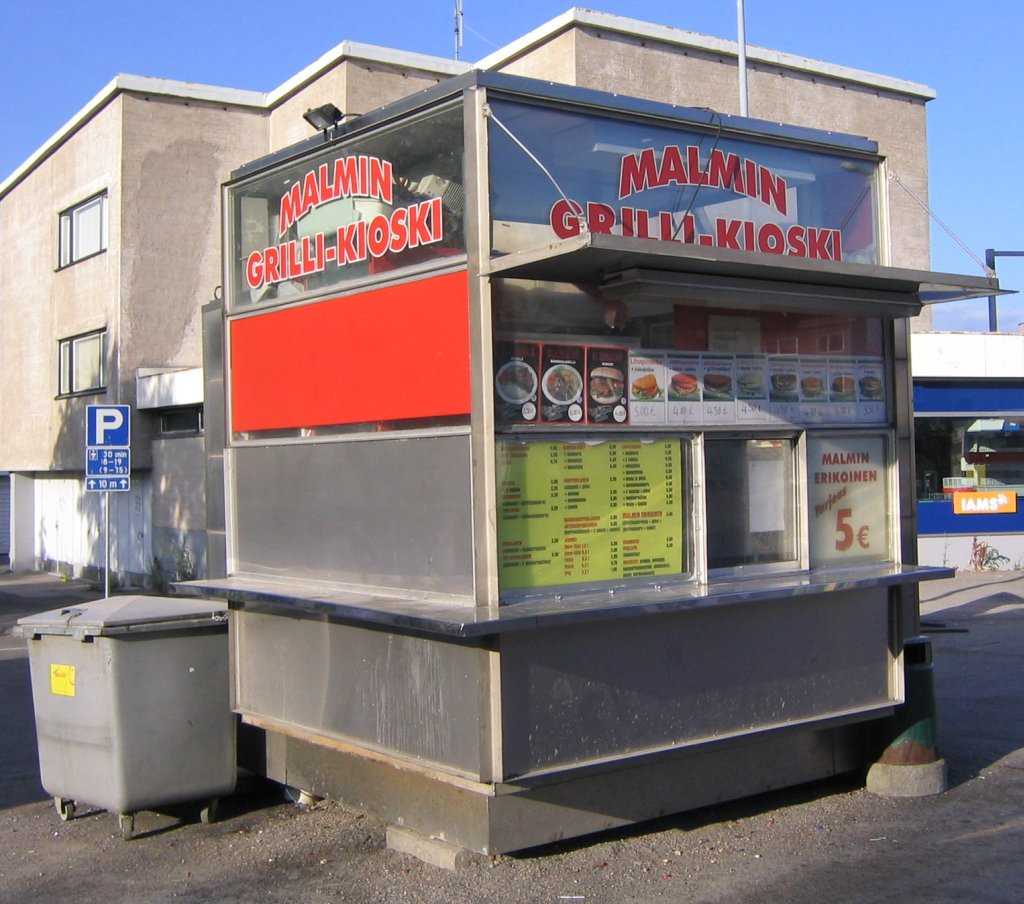
A snack bar in Malmi, Helsinki, Finland

A snack bar usually refers to an inexpensive food counter that is part of a permanent structure where snack foods and light meals are sold.

== Description ==
A beach snack bar is often a small building situated high on the sand. Besides soft drinks, candies and chewing gum, some snack bars sell hot dogs, hamburgers, french fries, potato chips, corn chips and other foods. While this is usually the case, sometimes "snack bar" refers to a small café or cafeteria. Various small, casual dining establishments may be called "snack bars", including beverage and snack counters at movie theaters, and small delis. Many places with snack bars have a policy prohibiting outside food and drink in order to encourage sales.

In movie theaters and other types of theaters, the snack bar is usually located in the lobby.

The first known use of the word "snack bar" was in 1930.

== Similar entities ==
Snack bar may also refer to:

- A Japanese hostess bar
- A small café or "greasy spoon" style restaurant
- A concession stand, which can be found in a variety of locations such as beach, cinema, and other entertainment venues
- A food cart, mobile kitchen or food truck
- An ice cream van
- A tapas bar
- A lunch counter
- A tuck shop
