= The Hayes =

Area and street in Cardiff, Wales

Coordinates: 51.4791°N 3.1761°W

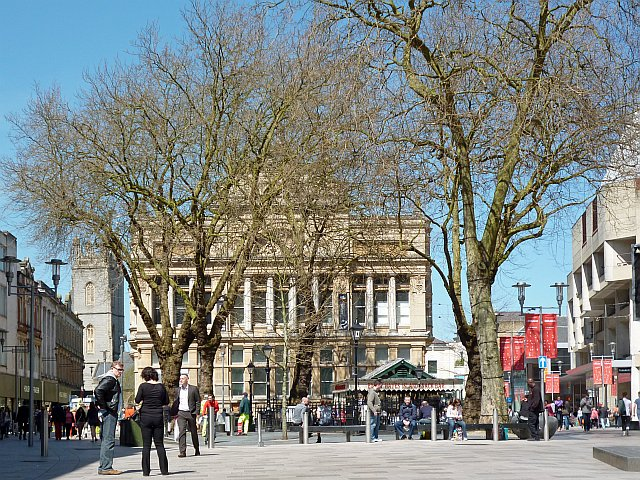
The northern end of The Hayes, showing the Old Library, with St John's Church visible to the left.

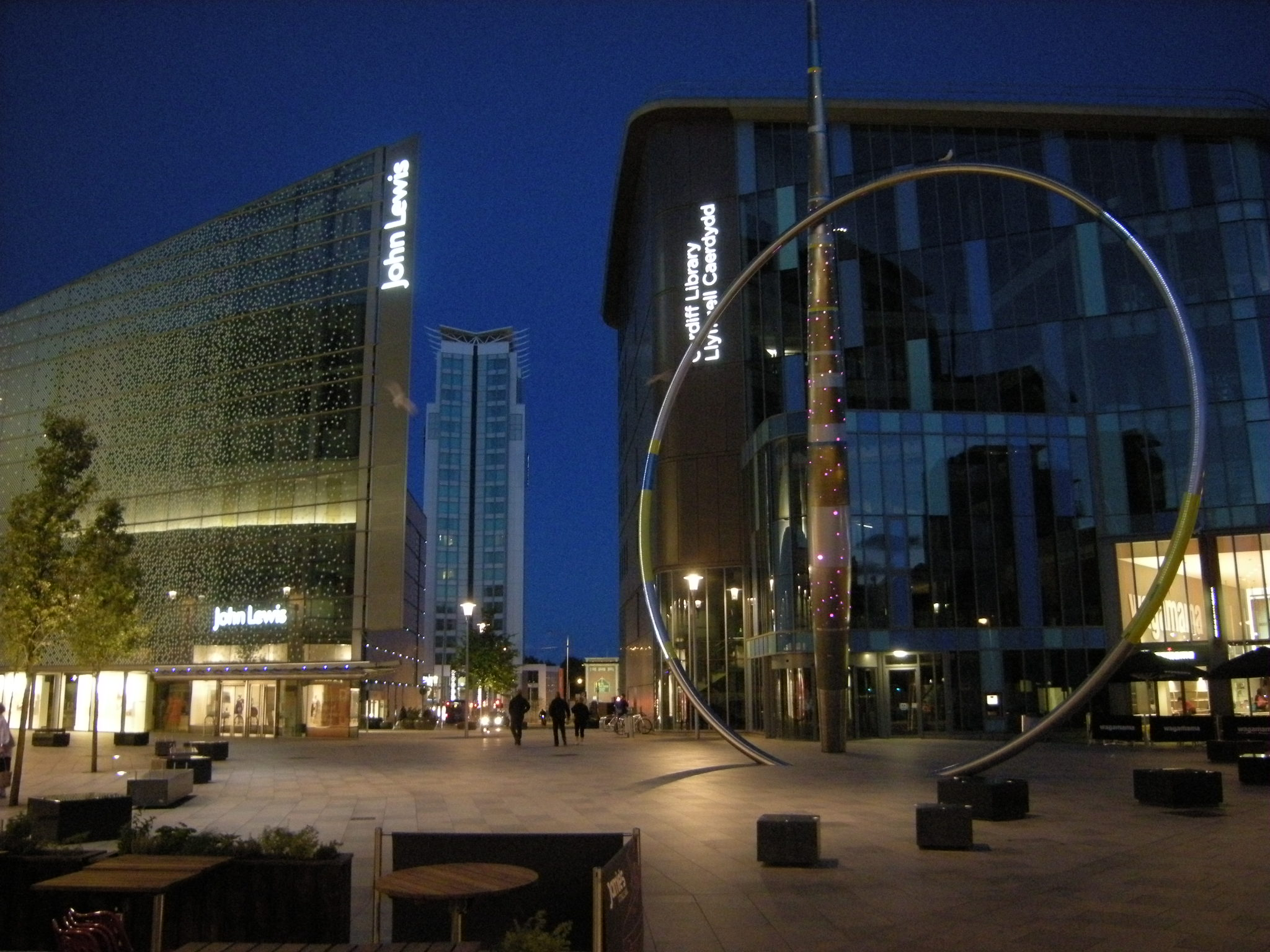
The southern end of The Hayes, showing part of St David's, a Radisson Blu hotel, Alliance and the new Central Library

The Hayes (Welsh: Yr Ais) is a commercial area in the southern city centre of the Welsh capital, Cardiff. Centred on the road of that name leading south towards the east end of the city centre, the area is mostly pedestrianised and is the location of the Hayes Island Snack Bar.

At the north end of The Hayes is the Old Library, known as the Cardiff Free Library, Museum and Schools for Science and Art during its century (1882 to 1988) of use as the second incarnation of the city's central library. The latest, fourth permanent Cardiff Central Library opened in 2009 and is situated at the opposite end of the Hayes.

Scenes of BBC's Doctor Who and Torchwood have often been filmed here.

== Etymology ==
The name Hayes for a place name derives from the Norman French word Haie, or possibly the French word La Haye meaning hedge or enclosured field.

== Architecture ==
Cardiff is famous for its Victorian arcades. These include the Royal Arcade and Morgan Arcade, both of which have entrances on The Hayes. Morgan Arcade is the present home to Spillers Records, which is the oldest record shop in the world.

== Renovation ==
In 2006, the closure of the David Morgan department store saw a redevelopment of The Hayes. The David Morgan store was renovated, with the upper floors being converted to apartments with retail units below. A number of retailers moved into the area. 2009 saw the addition of the St David's 2 development anchored by a John Lewis department store and Central Library at the southern end of the Hayes. The St David's side of the Hayes brought new retail units and apartments running the full length of The Hayes. The street and surrounding area was repaved and landscaped, at St David's Hall a large screen has been attached to the exterior for public events.

One of the most prominent new features of The Hayes since its redevelopment is 'Alliance'. This 25m high sculpture by Jean Bernard Métais is a large stainless steel ring and pointed column.

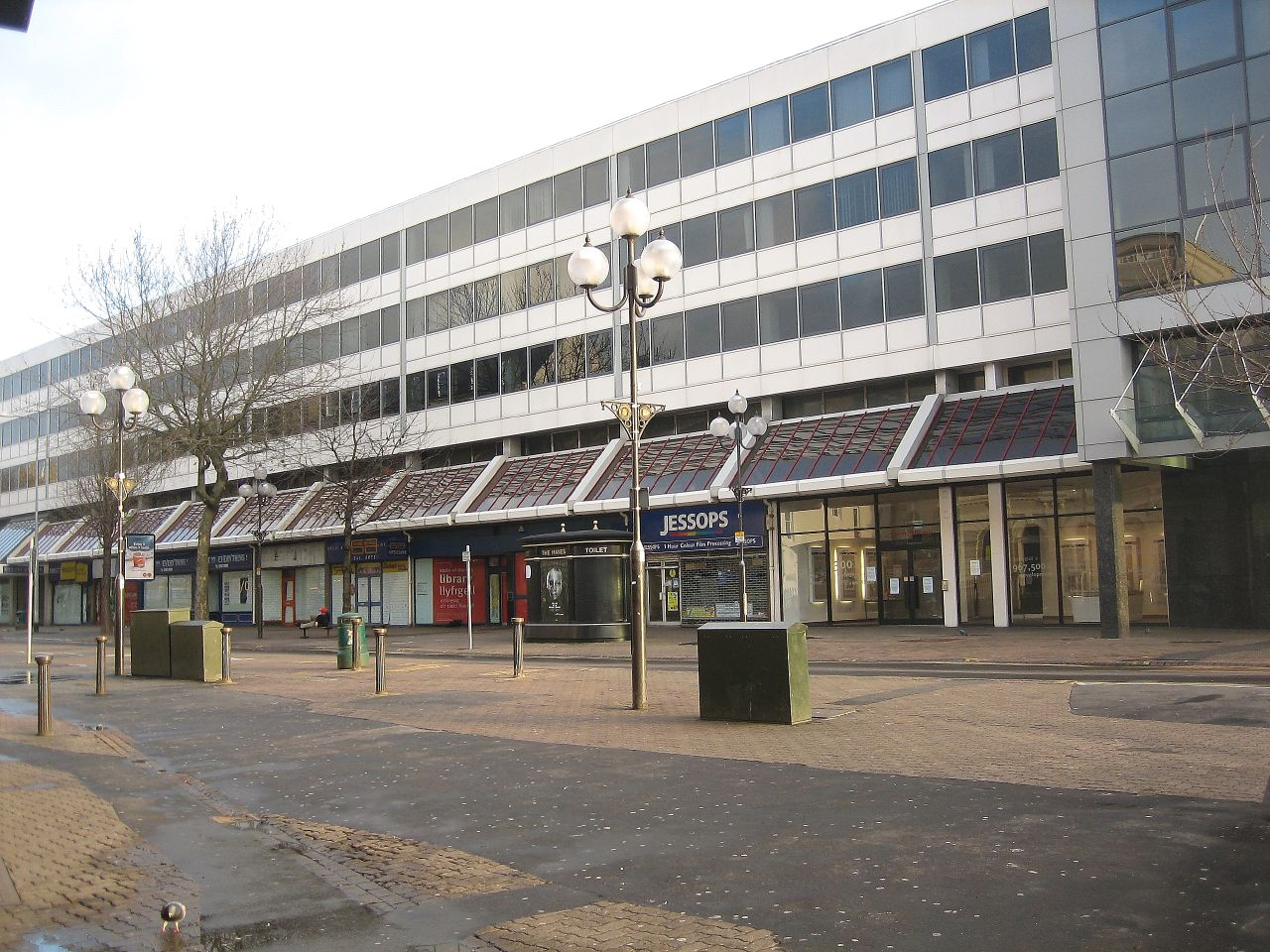
Oxford House, 2006

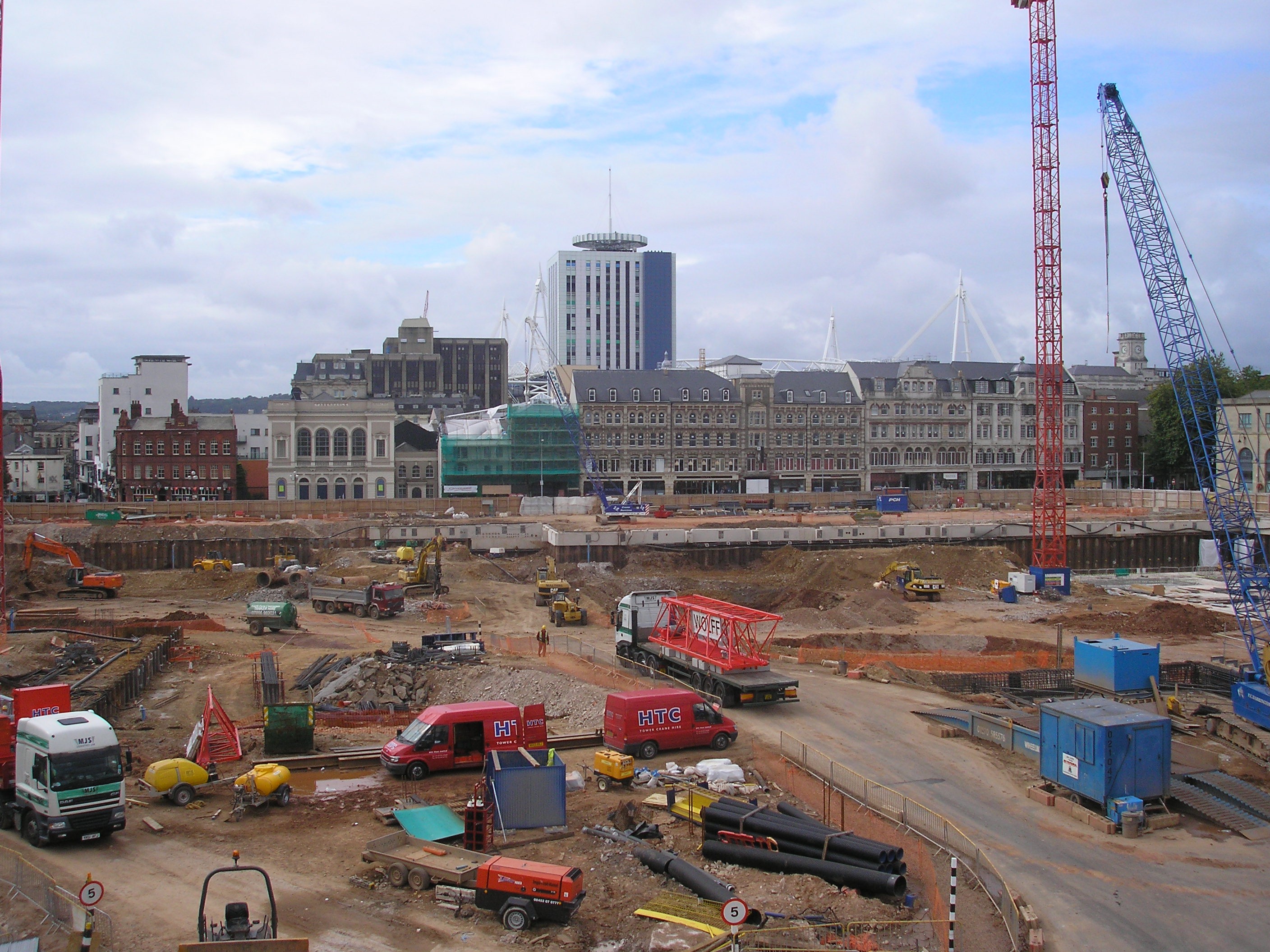
February 2007

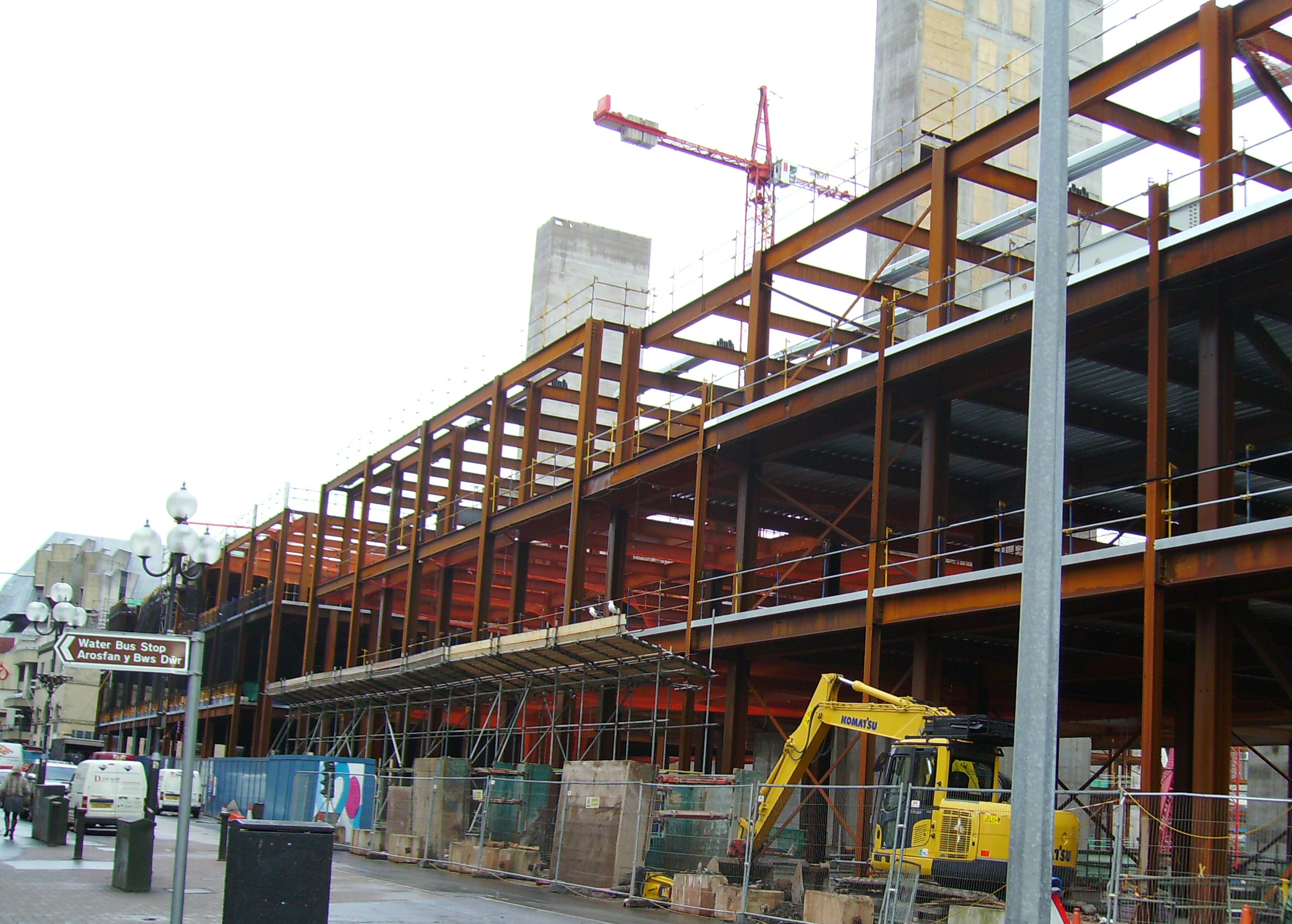
Construction of St. David's, April 2008

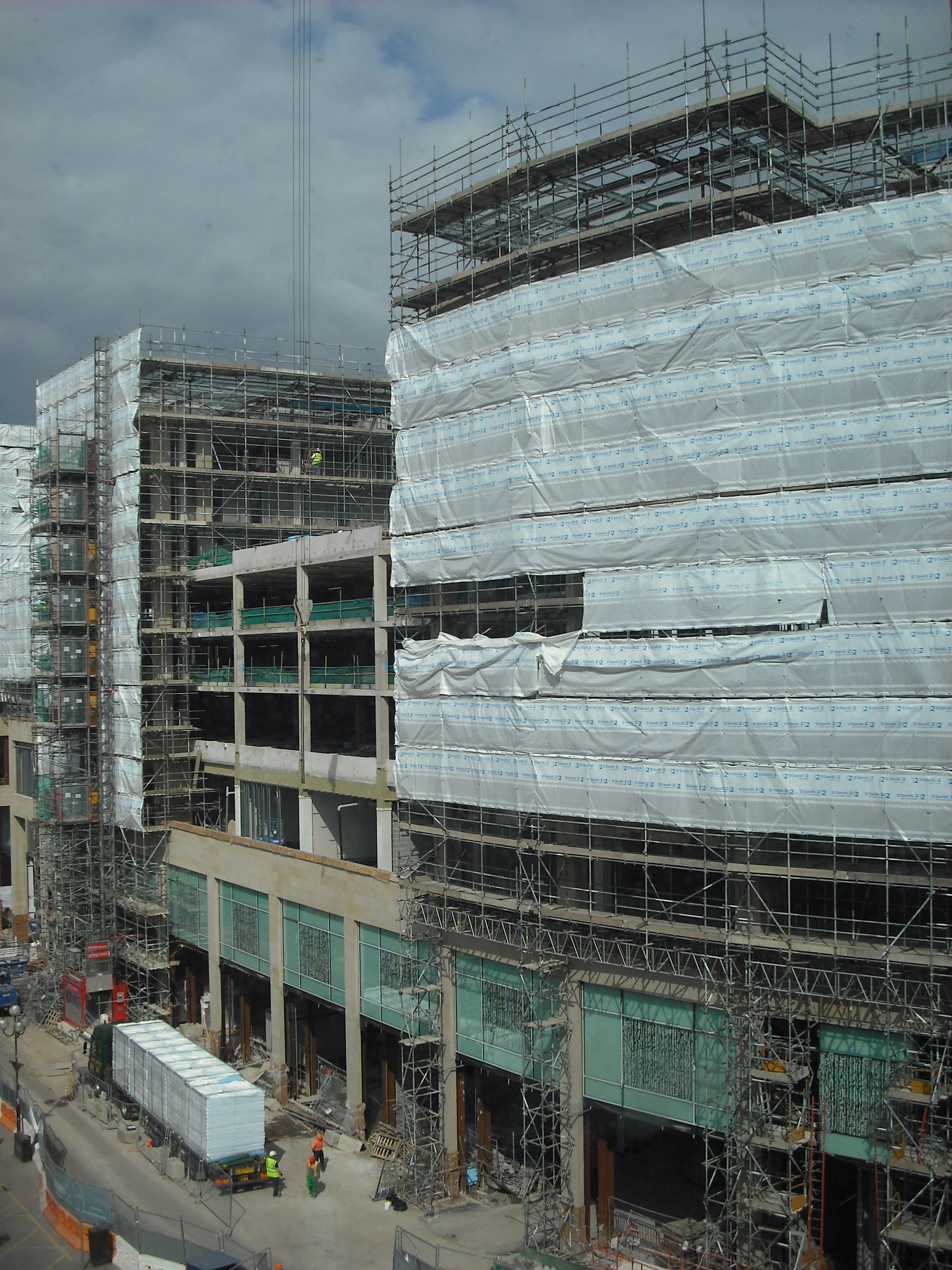
April 2009

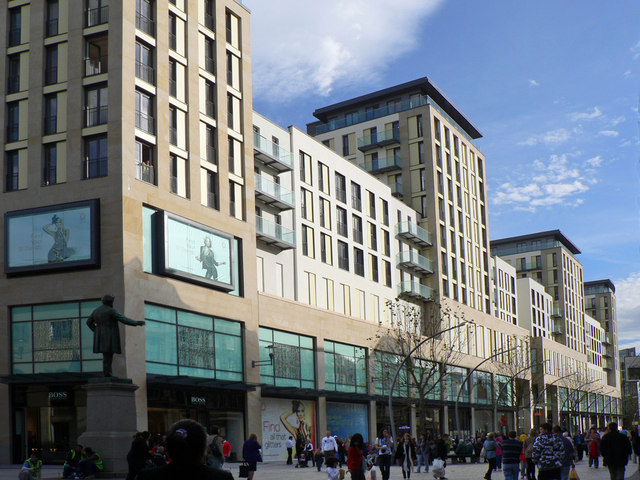
St. David's after completion

== Buildings and structures ==
Buildings in The Hayes

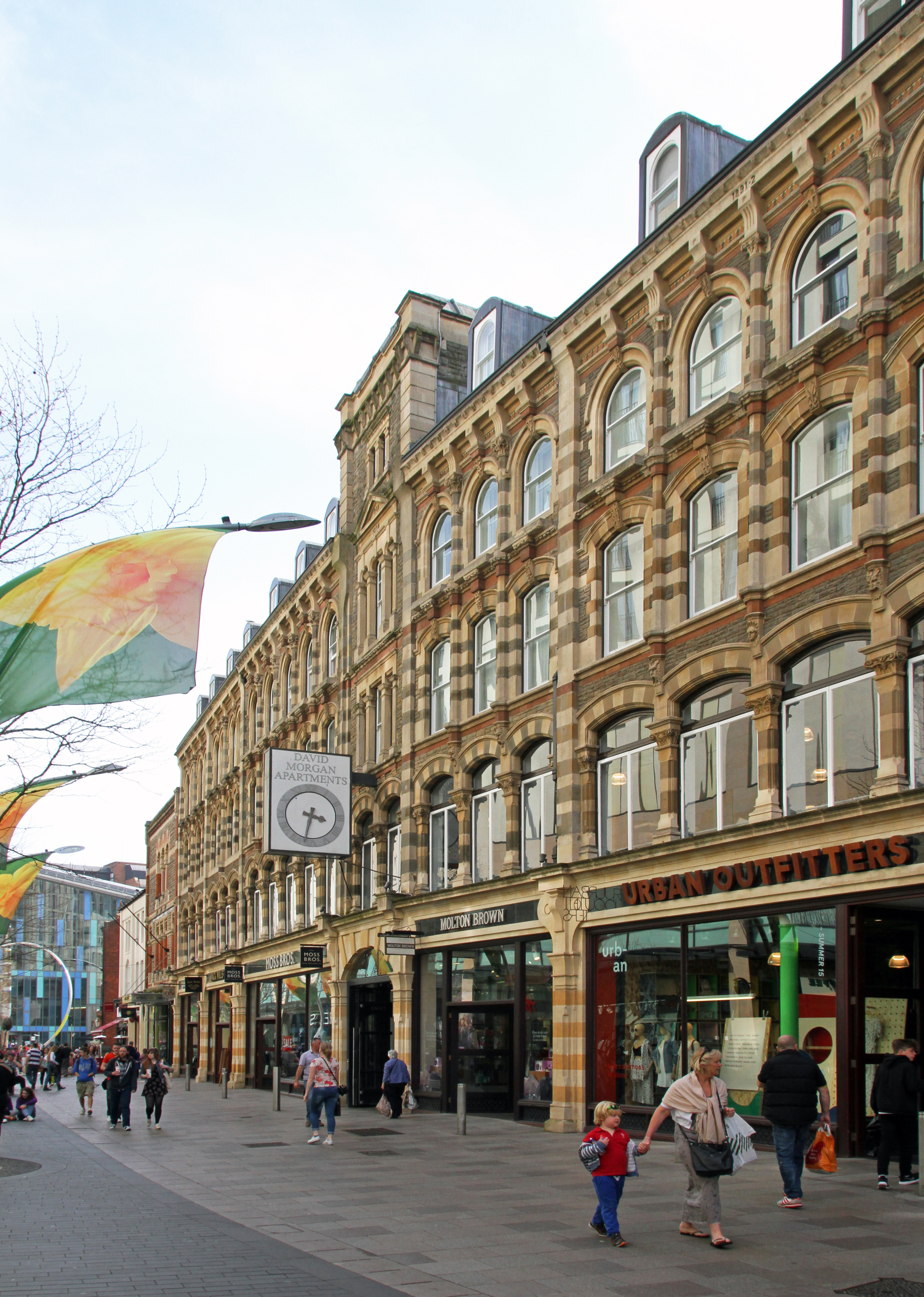
The former David Morgan department store

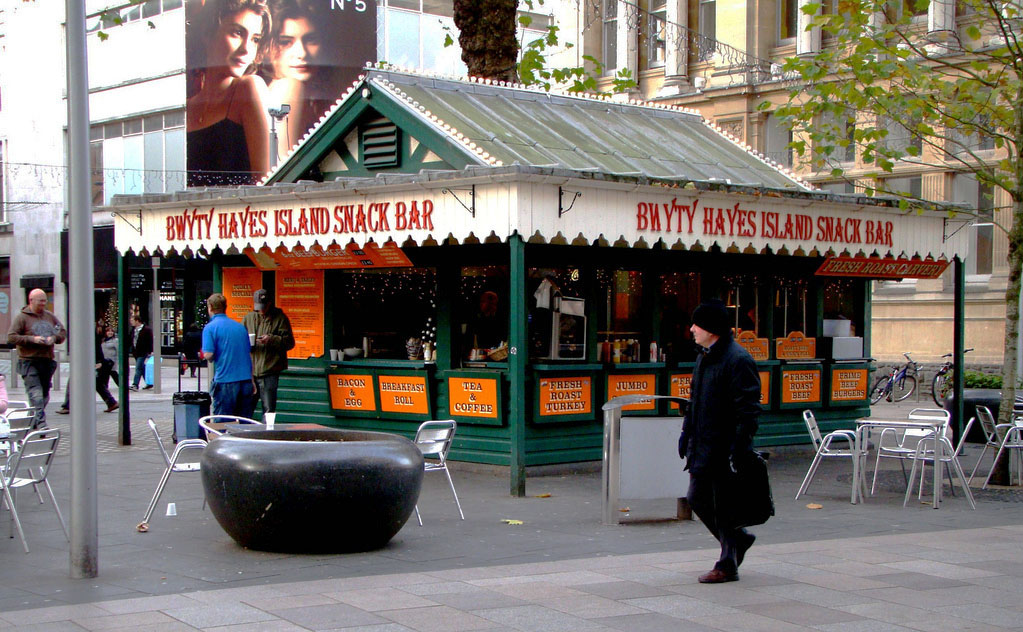
Hayes Island Snack Bar

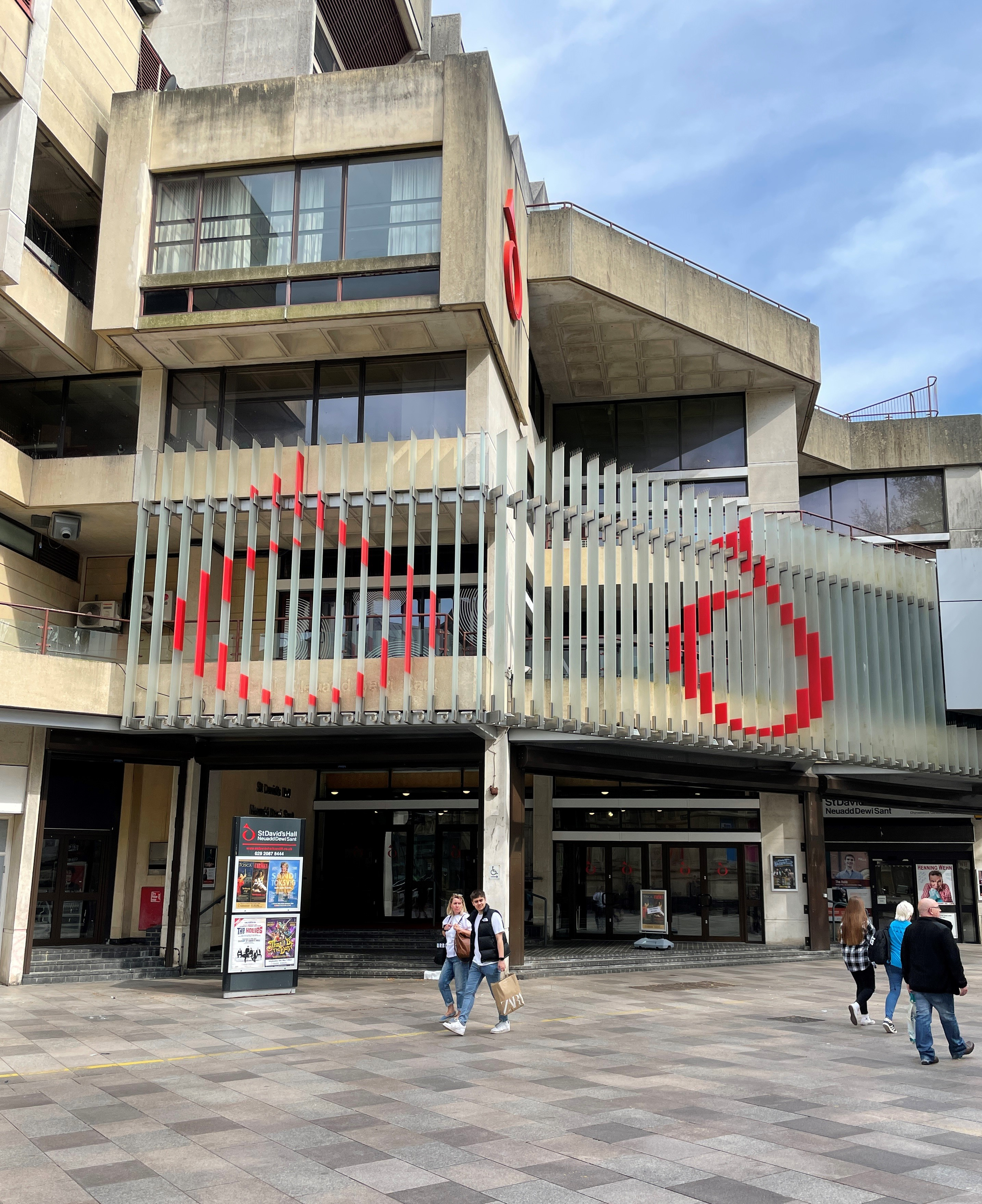
St David's Hall

At the southern end of The Hayes is St David's shopping centre, one of the largest shopping centres in the UK. Facing the centre is the former David Morgan department store which are now mixed use apartments and retail space. Spillers Records, which claims to be the oldest record shop in the world dating back to 1894, was situated here until 2010, when it moved to the nearby Morgan Arcade, due to the rising rent.

At the northern end of the area, and in addition to John Lewis and Debenhams in St. David's, was Howells department store, which was part of the House of Fraser group until it closed in 2023. Opposite Howells is St David's Hall, a large concert hall and exhibition centre, currently closed for RAAC refurbishment. Nearby is the Old Central Library, currently housing the Museum of Cardiff.

Centrally located in The Hayes is a statue of John Batchelor – a 19th-century Liberal politician.

=== Cardiff Central Library ===
The new Central Library opened on 14 March 2009. The former permanent Central Library was located a few hundred yards northeast of the present building and was knocked down to make way for the St. David's 2 development. The new library has six floors totalling and area of 55,000 sq ft (5,100 m^{2}) and 90,000 books.

=== St David's Hall ===
St David's Hall is a large performing arts and conference venue in The Hayes, and is the National Concert Hall and Conference Centre of Wales. It hosts the annual Welsh Proms, the Orchestral Series attracting renowned conductors and performers and the world-famous biennial Cardiff Singer of the World competition. As well as classical music it also plays host to jazz, soul, pop, rock, dance, children's, r&b, musicals and other forms of world music, as well as light entertainment artists. The foyers in the centre are open and have regular free performances from often local groups, and the many foyers, balconies and bar areas are also used to host art exhibitions. It also has its own Celebrity Restaurant, on top of the numerous bars. As of February 2025, it currently closed for RAAC refurbishment.

=== Alliance ===
Alliance is a 25 metres (82 ft) high sculpture in The Hayes. The sculpture consists of a large stainless steel and enamelled metal arrow column and a hoop, which glows in the dark, and falls and rises with the tide. Paid for by the St David's shopping centre as part of a £1.5m public art scheme in the city centre, it was installed in the space between the new mall and Cardiff Central Library

== Adjoining streets ==
It is adjoined by:

- Trinity Street (towards Cardiff Market and Cardiff Castle)
- Working Street (towards Queens Arcade and Cardiff City Hall)
- Caroline Street (also known as Chippy Lane towards Cardiff Central bus station and St. Mary's Street)
- Mill Lane (towards St. Mary's Street and Central railway station)
- Bridge Road (towards Bute Street and Cardiff Bay)
- Bridge Street (Towards Queen Street station)

== See also ==
- Cardiff city centre
- Cardiff Centenary Walk
- List of shopping arcades in Cardiff
