= Jane Henderson =

British conservator and academic

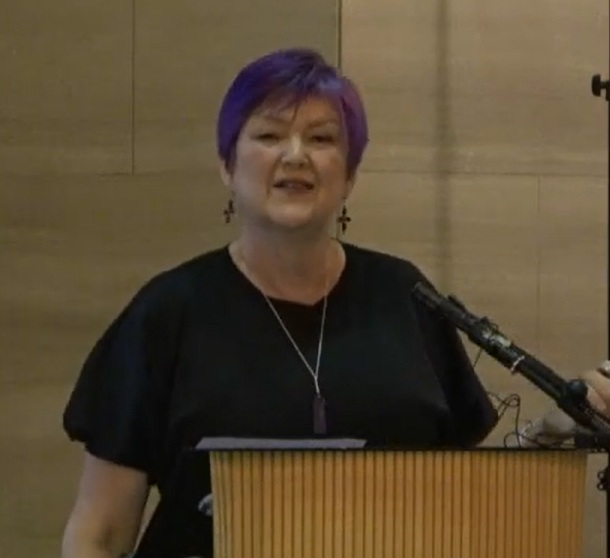
Jane in 2025

Laura Jane Dargie Henderson (born 25 October 1966) is a British conservator, activist, and academic. She is the secretary general of the International Institute for Conservation of Historic and Artistic Works, editor of the Journal of the Institute for Conservation, and acting president of the Federation of Museums and Art Galleries of Wales.

== Early life and education ==
Raised on 25 October 1966, in Dundee, Henderson had an interest in archaeology from the start. She knew from a young age that she wanted to work with heritage, but it would take until secondary school for her to realise that what she wanted to become was called a conservator.

Henderson moved to Wales around the time of the mining strikes of the 1980s, something she feels impacted her worldview and her ability to focus on her studies. She studied at Cardiff University where she gained a BSc Hons in archaeological conservation and later a MSc in collections care.

== Career ==
Following two years as a freelancer on short-term contracts in Wales, Henderson worked for Amgueddfa Cymru – Museum Wales as an archaeological conservator. She went on to work for The Council of Museums in Wales, first as an archaeology and antiquities conservator, then as a conservation adviser, and later conservation manager.

Henderson helped set up the Care of Collections Forum in 1995 as one of its founders. This organisation was later rolled into the British professional body for conservators, Icon, of which she has been a trustee. She has been dedicated to the development of professional standards including Icon's accreditation for conservator-restorers.

After finishing her postgraduate degree in 1999, Henderson worked as a grants officer for the Heritage Lottery Fund. Henderson then took up a post as a professional tutor at Cardiff University in 2002, becoming a senior lecturer in 2011. In 2016 she advanced to Reader, finally becoming a full Professor of Conservation in 2019. She teaches various modules on collections management, decision-making in conservation, and collections care in the museum environment as part of the undergraduate and postgraduate conservation courses at the university. Her dedication to the conservation students at Cardiff University has earned her several awards.

She leads the British Standards Institute B/560 group focused on preserving tangible cultural heritage and serves as a UK expert on the CEN TC 346 WG11, which addresses standards for the conservation process, procurement, terminology, and documentation principles.

== Memberships and wider impact ==
Henderson is a prominent member of the international conservation community, holding the office of Secretary General of the IIC, of which she is also an elected Fellow. During her time as secretary general she has led a governance review to create a more agile and inclusive organisation. She is also an active member of the International Council of Museums and the Association of Critical Heritage Studies. She is a member of the Museums Association and was an invited member of their Decolonisation Leaders Network in 2022.

Closer to home Henderson is acting president and co-opted trustee of the Welsh Museums Federation as well as an assessor for its grants programmes. She is a long-standing driving force behind the Conservation Matters in Wales conferences. Henderson has also been a trustee of Cynon Valley Museum Trust (2015-2017) in Aberdare, a member of the Welsh Government Museum Strategy Working Group, and a trustee of the Collections Trust

Since 2017, Henderson has a semi-regular segment called ‘Dear Jane’ on the industry-leading podcast The C Word: The Conservators’ Podcast, in which she responds to listener questions as a conservation agony aunt.

Henderson is known for her activism, notably lobbying for Cardiff Story Museum to be saved.

== Honours and awards ==
Henderson won the Royal Warrant Holders Association's Plowden Medal for significant contributions to the advancement of conservation in 2021. She was recognised for her leadership, her commitment to new generations of conservation professionals, her contributions to the development of the profession, and being a leading educator and thinker in the field.

== Personal life ==
Henderson describes herself as a soccer mum, having two children who love football. She is a season ticket holder for Cardiff City F.C. for that reason. Her presentations frequently feature her two sons, aiming to normalise the inclusion of family in academia and conservation. Henderson is a fan of Taylor Swift. She is a cancer survivor.

== Publications ==
Henderson is an active researcher and has published in various books, journals, and online publications. Some of her notable publications include:

- Henderson, Jane; Lingle, Ashley (2024). "Touch Decisions: For Heritage Objects". Journal of the American Institute for Conservation. 63: 1–13. doi:10.1080/01971360.2023.2175983.
- Henderson, Jane; Waller, Robert (2024). "Dissociation and Loss: A Challenge for Sustainable and Inclusive Conservation" (PDF). Studies in Conservation. 69: 169–175. doi:10.1080/00393630.2024.2339768.
- Sweetnam, Eleanor; Henderson, Jane (2022). "Disruptive Conservation: Challenging Conservation Orthodoxy". Studies in Conservation. 67 (1–2): 63–71. doi:10.1080/00393630.2021.1947073.
- Henderson, Jane (2022). "Conservators Delivering Change". Studies in Conservation. 67: 105–111. doi:10.1080/00393630.2022.2066320.
- Henderson, J.; Parkes, P. (2021). "Using complexity to deliver standardised educational levels in conservation". ICOM-CC 19th Triennial Conference 2021, Beijing, China, 17-21 May 2021. Transcending Boundaries: Integrated Approaches to Conservation.
- Henderson, Jane (2020). "Beyond lifetimes: Who do we exclude when we keep things for the future?". Journal of the Institute of Conservation. 43 (3): 195–212. doi:10.1080/19455224.2020.1810729.
- Henderson, Jane; Waller, Robert; Hopes, David (2020). "Begin with Benefits: Reducing Bias in Conservation Decision-Making". Studies in Conservation. 65. doi:10.1080/00393630.2020.1787638.
- Henderson, Jane (2018). "Managing Uncertainty for Preventive Conservation". Studies in Conservation. 63: 108–112. doi:10.1080/00393630.2018.1479936.
- Henderson, Jane; Nakamoto, Tanya (2016). "Dialogue in conservation decision-making". Studies in Conservation. 61: 67–78. doi:10.1080/00393630.2016.1183106.
- Chaplin, E., Henderson, J. and Parkes, P. 2023. Museum Spotlight Survey 2022. Project Report. [Online]. Cardiff: Welsh Government
