= St John's Gardens =

St John's Gardens may refer to the following:

- St John's Gardens, Cardiff, Wales, formerly part of the graveyard of St John's church
- St John's Gardens, Liverpool, England, a public space in the city centre
- St John's Gardens, Manchester, England, formerly the site of St John's church and graveyard
- St John's Gardens, part of the church of St John Clerkenwell, London
