= St John's Gardens, Cardiff =

Park in Cardiff, Wales

Coordinates: 51.4805°N 3.1778°W

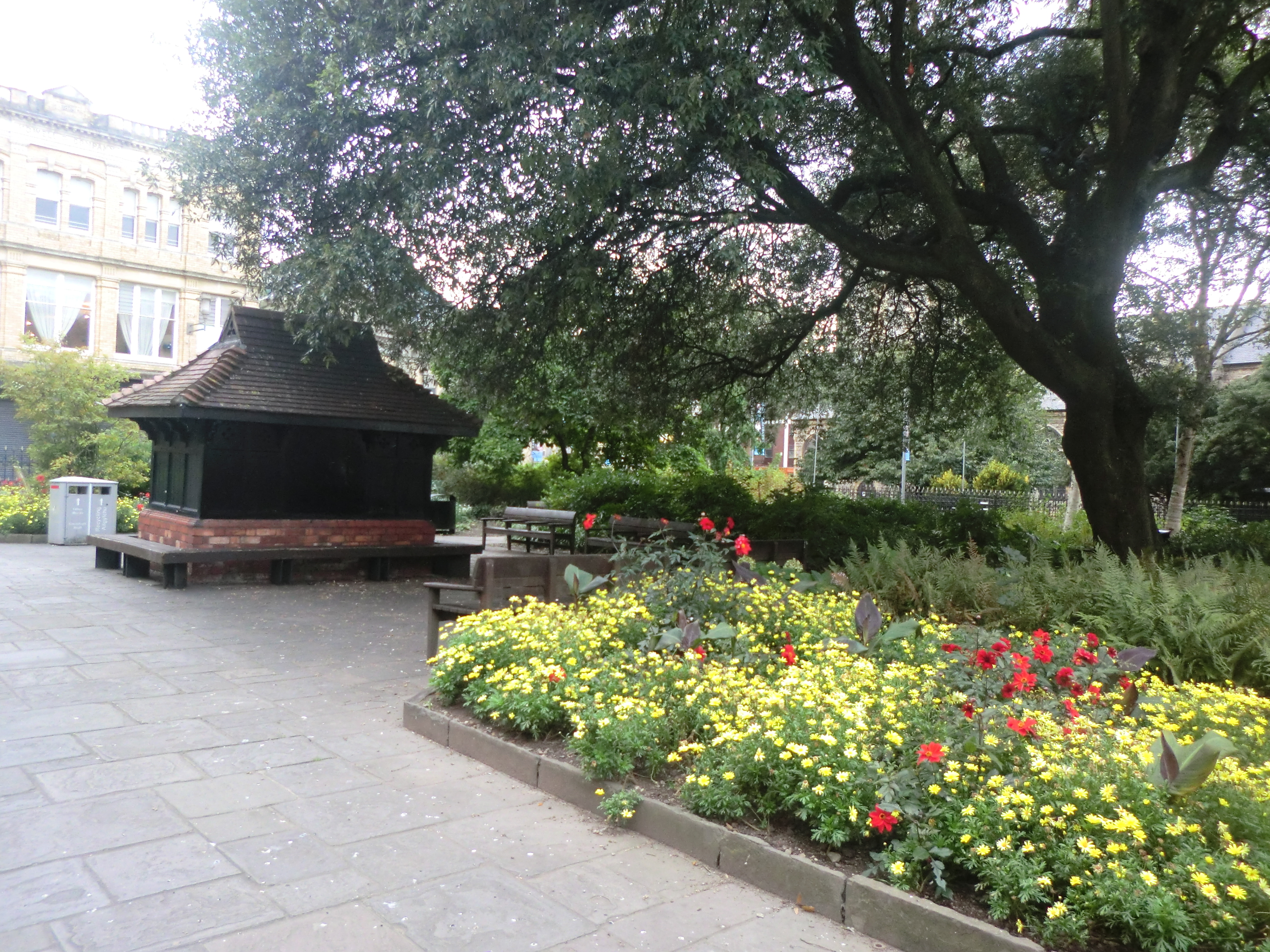

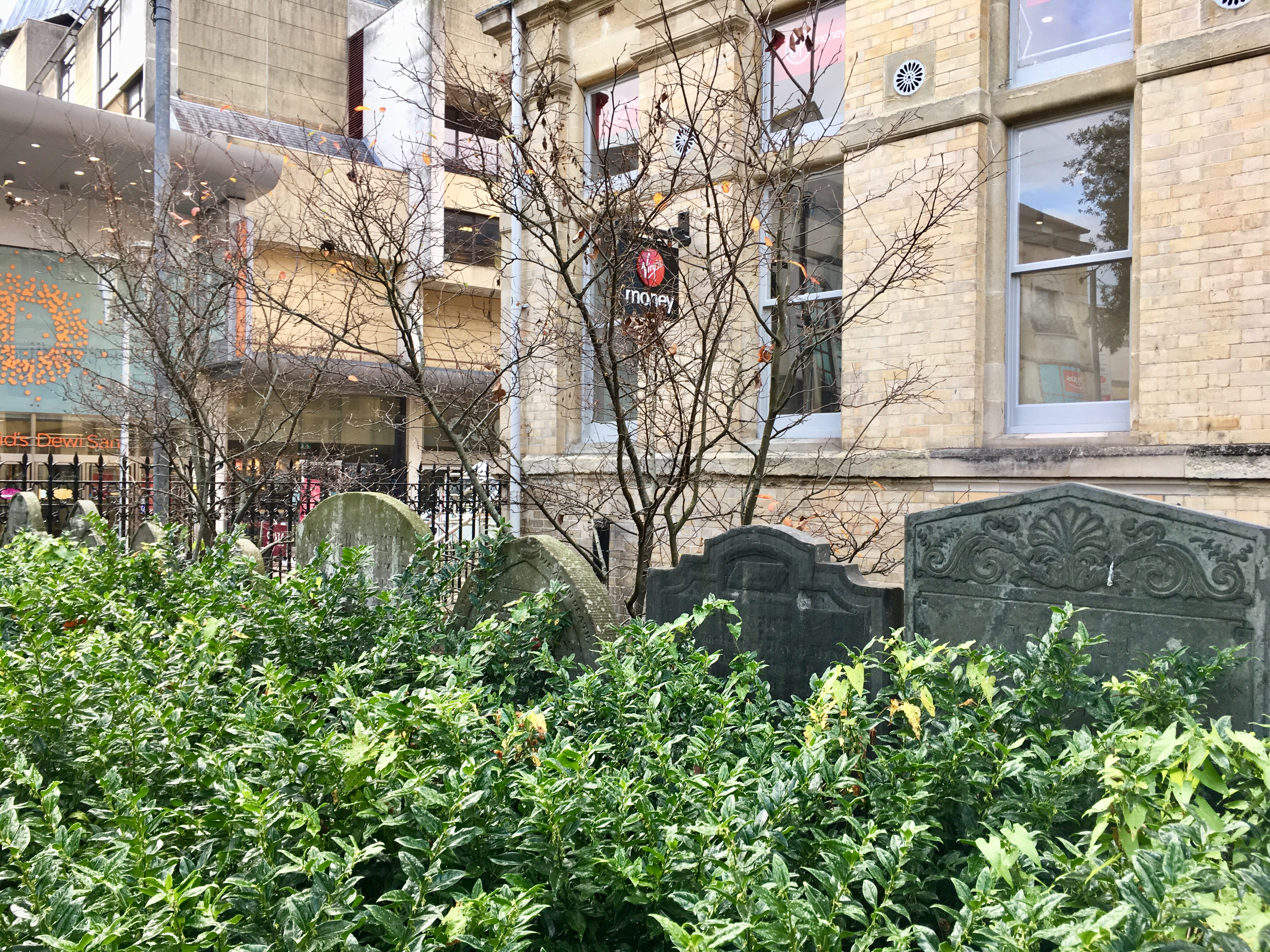
Gravestones in the Gardens

St. John's Gardens (Welsh: Gerddi Sant Ioan) is a small public garden in the centre of the Cardiff, the capital of wales. It is located between St John's Church and the Old Library. The park is around 1000 m² in size and is enclosed by cast iron railings. The gardens have some old trees (including a large magnolia tree), some flower beds, a central hut and several benches.

Originally part of the graveyard of St John's Church, which stretched south from the church to the library building, the area was separated when the Cardiff Corporation built a public path between Working Street and Cardiff Central Market during the 1890s. As part of the agreement with the church, the Corporation agreed to take responsibility for the area which is now St John's Gardens. The Gardens still contain tombs and gravestones.

The railings and gates (dating from the 1890s) are Grade II listed. The wooden hut at the centre of the gardens is also Grade II listed.

The gardens were closed for six months in 2018 because of anti-social behaviour in the area.
