= St John the Baptist Church, Cardiff =

Church in Cardiff, Wales

Coordinates: 51.48072°N 3.17837°W

St John the Baptist Church
- The City Parish of St John The Baptist
- Welsh: Eglwys Sant Ioan Fedyddiwr
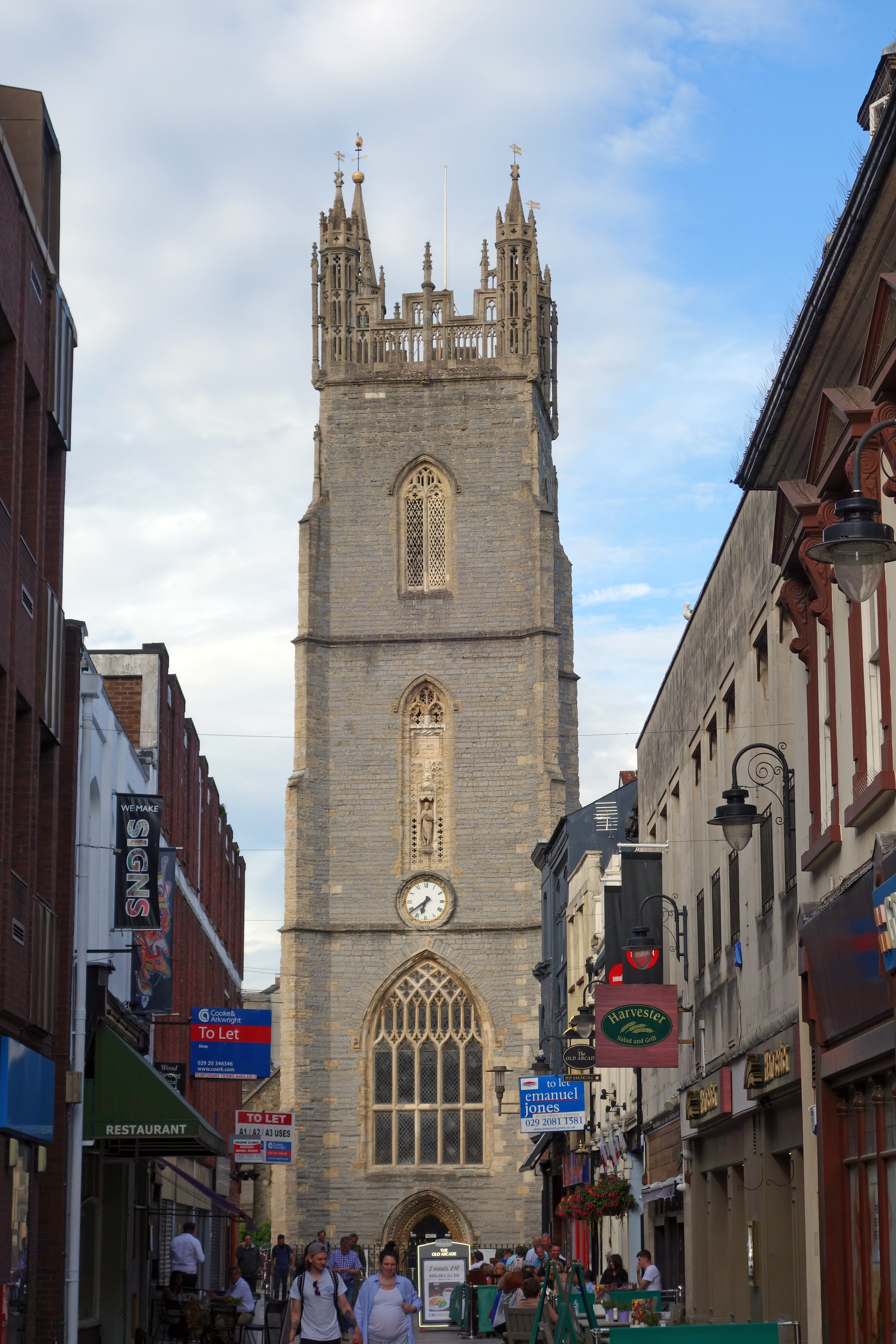
- View from Church Street
- St John the Baptist Church
- Address: St John Street, Cardiff
- Country: Wales
- Language: English
- Denomination: Anglican
- Previous denomination: Roman Catholic
- Website: www.stjohnscardiff.wales

History
- Status: Parish Church
- Dedication: John the Baptist

Architecture
- Functional status: Active
- Heritage designation: Grade I
- Designated: 1952
- Style: Perpendicular Gothic
- Years built: c. 1180

Administration
- Diocese: Llandaff
- Archdeaconry: Llandaff
- Deanery: Cardiff

St John the Baptist Church is a Grade I listed parish church in Cardiff, Wales. Other than Cardiff Castle, it is the only medieval building in the city centre.

== Description ==
Black's Picturesque Guide through Wales (1851) described St John's as "an ancient and finely proportioned edifice, with a noble quadrangular tower, surmounted by pierced battlements and four open gothic pinnacles... It is justly admired, and forms a conspicuous feature in every view of the town." The same remains true today, with good views of the church from Church Street, Trinity Street and Working Street in the city centre.

John Newman, in his Glamorgan volume of the Pevsner Buildings of Wales series, describes the pinnacled west tower as a "magnificent marker". At a height of over 40 metres the tower is in four stages, faced in grey limestone ashlar with details in buff coloured Dundry stone.

== History ==
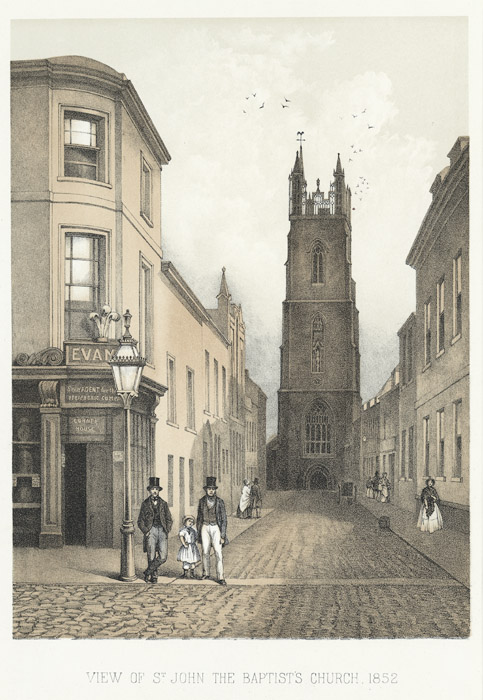
View down Church Street towards St John's Church in 1852

The church was built in 1180 as a chapel of ease for the larger St Mary's Church, itself founded by Benedictine monks from Tewkesbury Abbey. Originally constructed of blue Lias, a Jurassic stone with layers of fossilised shells, it was sourced from Aberthaw. The walls were then originally dressed with freestone - limestone sourced from Dundry.

St John's was sacked during a rebellion of Owain Glyndŵr in 1404. The church was rebuilt in the second half of the 15th century and given a perpendicular tower with a peal of ten bells. Today it still has a crown of openwork battlements, reminiscent of churches in the West Country of England, and is dated c. 1490 because of the similar Jasper Tower of Llandaff Cathedral which was built at this time.

After the foundations of St Mary's were destroyed by the Bristol Channel flood of 1607, the two churches were worked as a dual-location parish until all main services were moved to St John in 1620.

In 1843, the 2nd Marquess of Bute paid for the construction of the Church of St Mary and St Stephen in Bute Street as a permanent replacement for St Mary's. This allowed the reconstruction of St John, with extensions to the church made in 1886–1897 using carboniferous limestone quarried from Culverhouse Cross. The churchyard wall was also rebuilt, using original Lias mixed with red sandstone in the walls, topped with coping stones of Devonian sandstones from the Forest of Dean.

In 1851 the Cardiff firm of Messrs. Thomas & Norris were engaged for repewing of St John's with the work to be completed by Christmas that year.

St John's stained glass windows date from circa 1855, in the north chapel, with references to the Bute family. Those in the north inner aisle date to 1869, by Morris & Co, with a top row of apostles designed by William Morris himself.

The church was increased in width with outer aisles added to St John's in 1889 and 1891. The old aisle windows were re-set and all the new building was re-surfaced with Sweldon limestone.

The graveyard, already full, was divided by a new public pathway in the 1890s connecting Working Street with Cardiff Central Market. As part of the agreement for the new path, Cardiff Corporation agreed to take responsibility for the graveyard south of the path. This later became St John's Gardens. The path is still owned by the church and is closed every Good Friday. Brass numbers on the path mark the location of graves and family tombs.

In 1952 St John's became a Grade I listed building, of exceptional architectural and historical interest.

The church serves as the priory church for Wales of the Order of Saint John.

== Pipe Organ ==
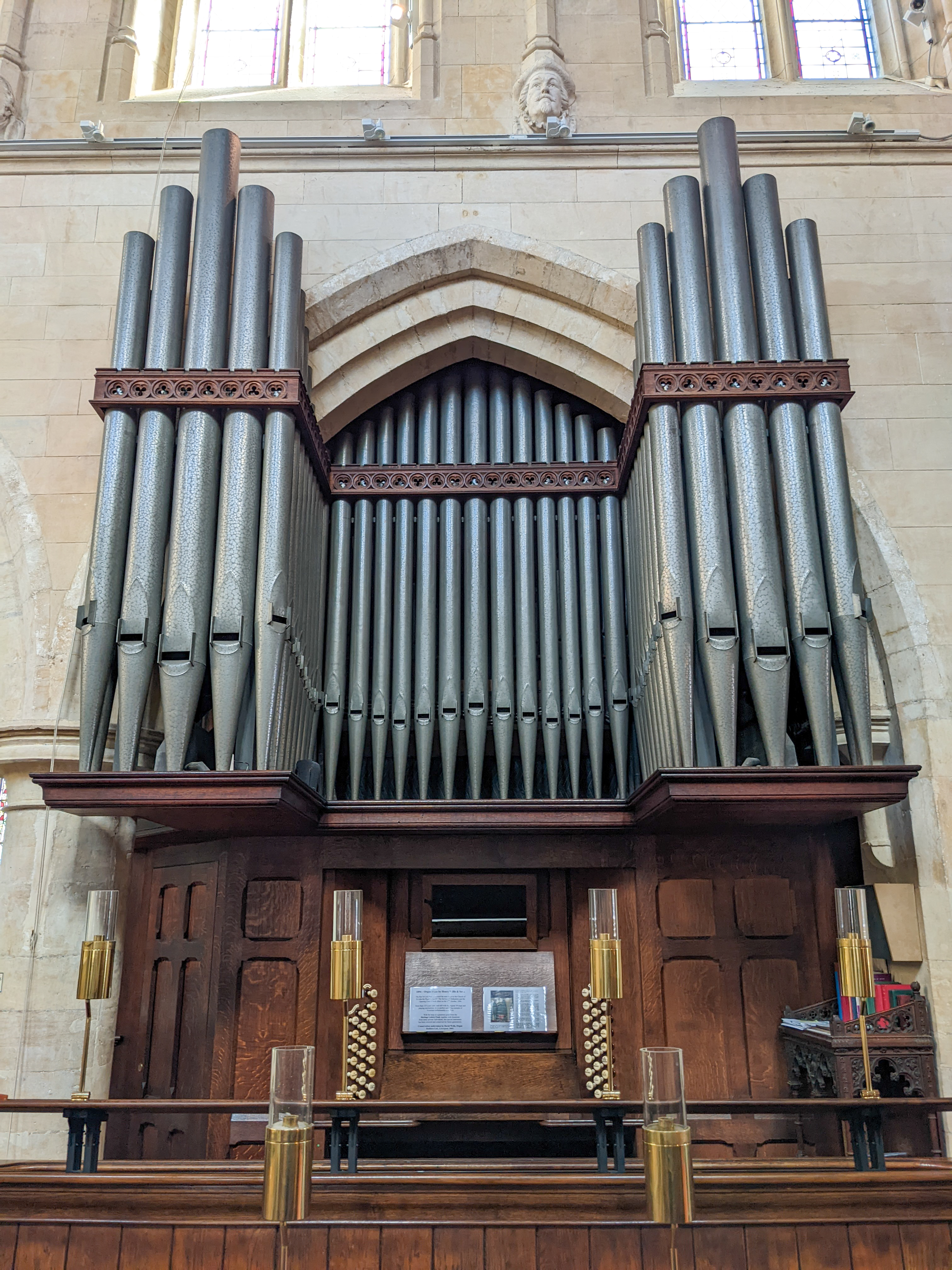
The church's 1894 "Father Willis" organ

The church's current organ was built in 1894 by "Father" Henry Willis. It was restored in 2005 by David Wells of Liverpool, funded by private donations and the Heritage Lottery Fund. The completion of the restoration was marked with a concert by Thomas Trotter, attended by the Lord Lieutenant of South Glamorgan and Lord Mayor of Cardiff. In 2013 the British Institute of Organ Studies awarded it a Grade I Historic Organ Certificate, as an organ of exceptional interest.

== Gallery ==
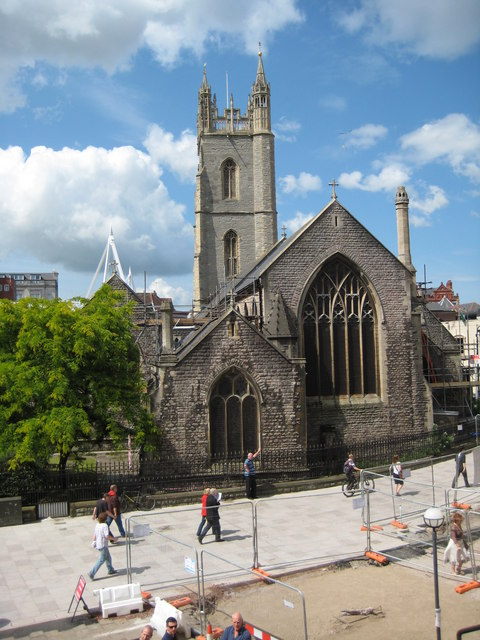
View from the east

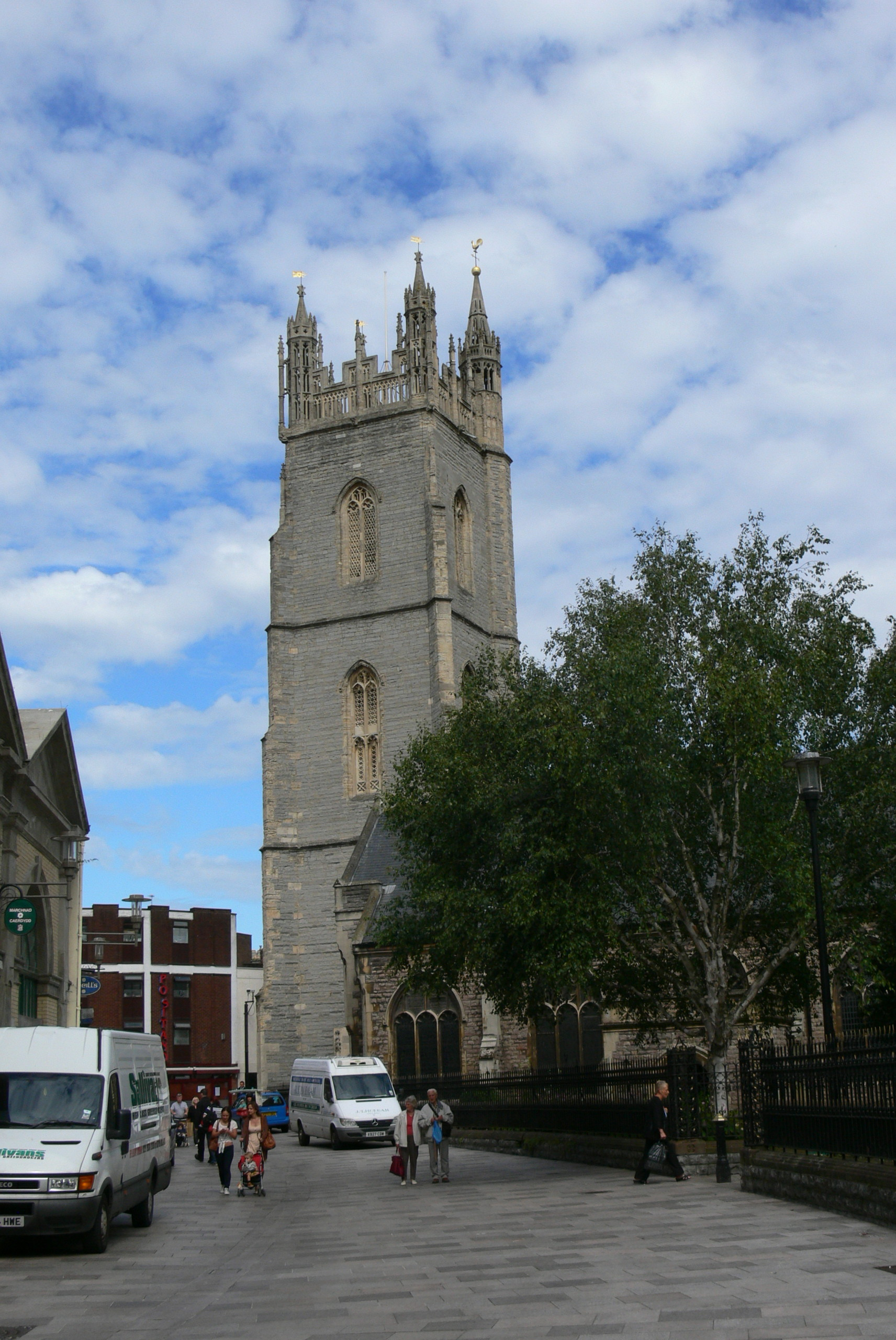
The 14th-century tower

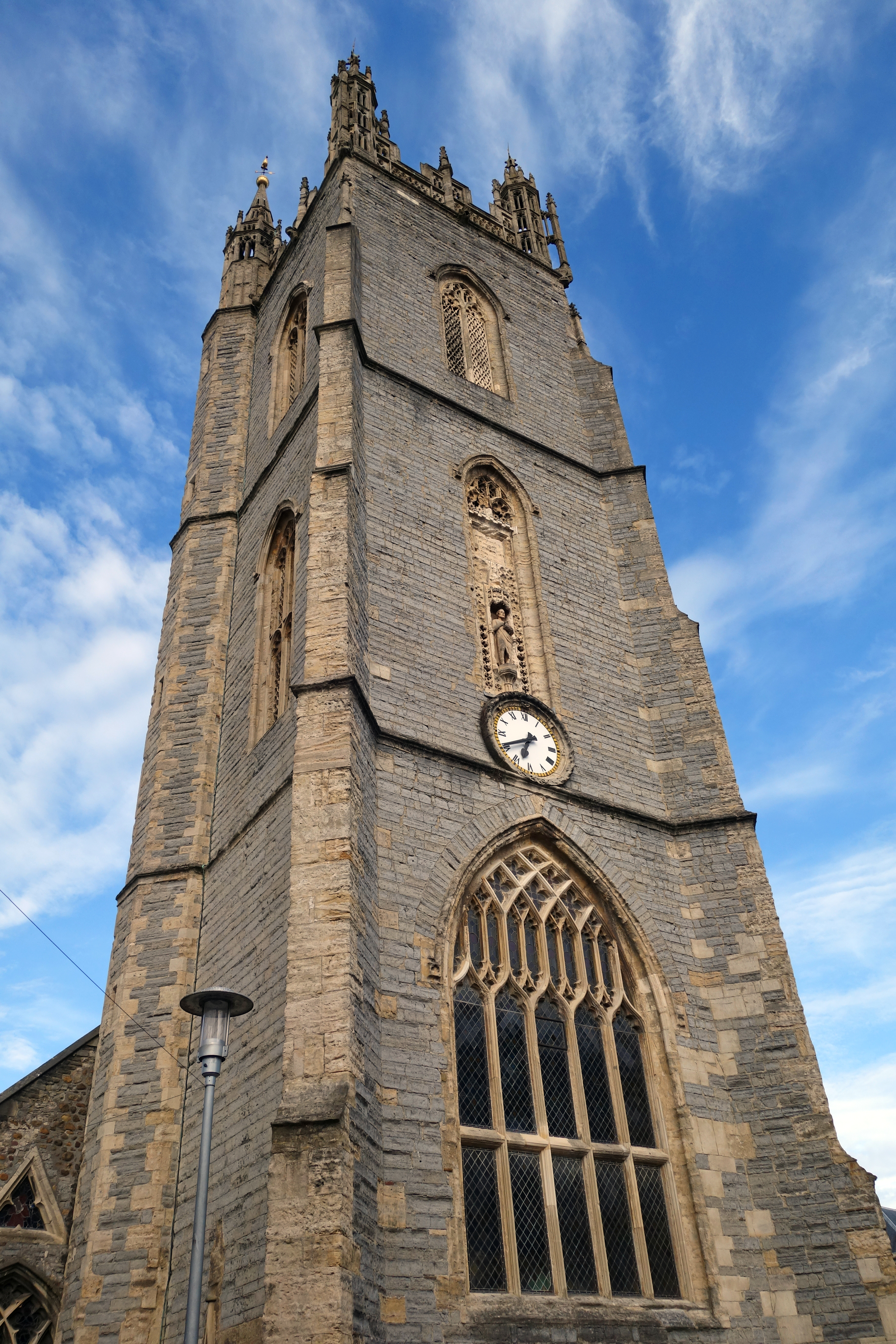
Church tower from the west

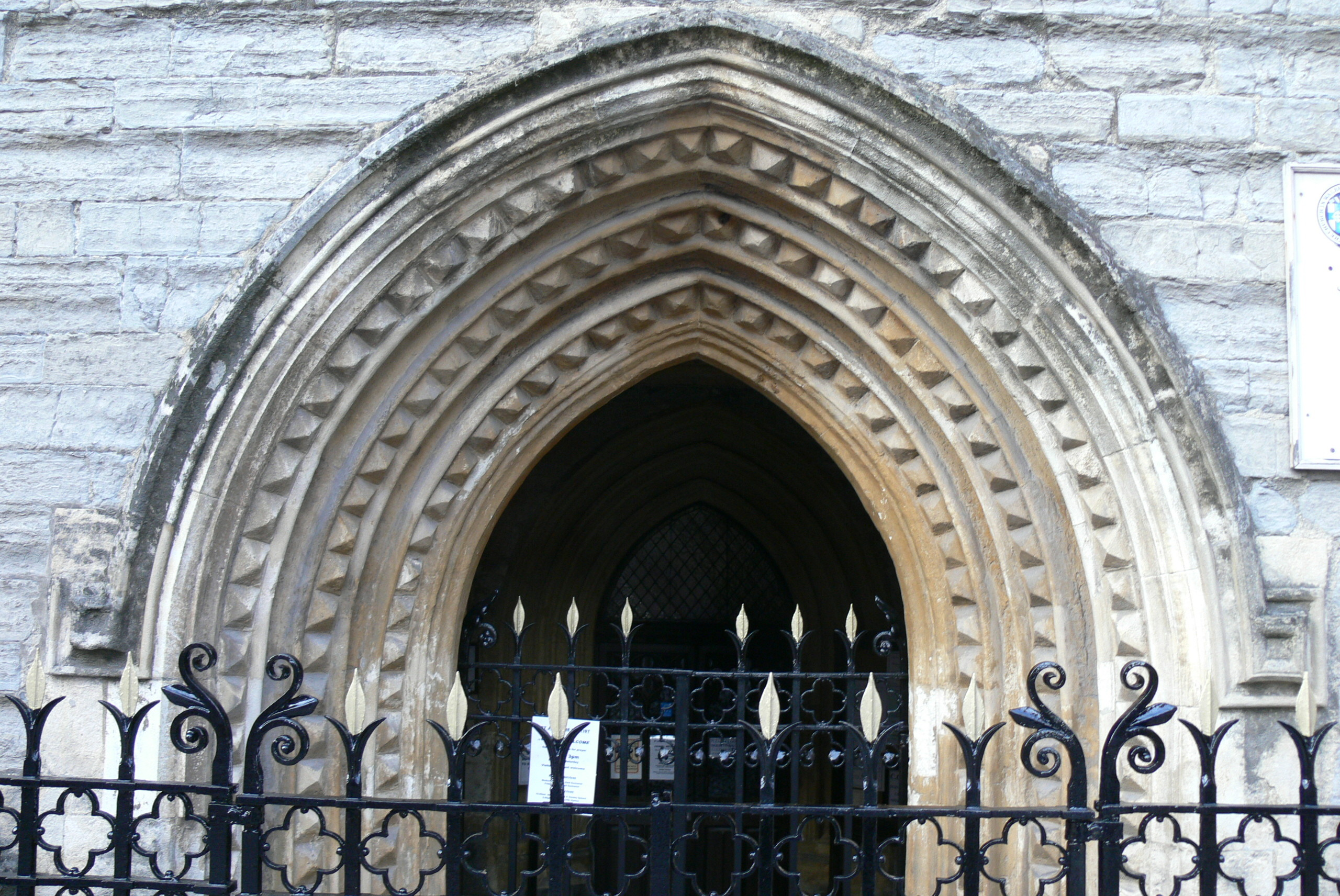
Entrance

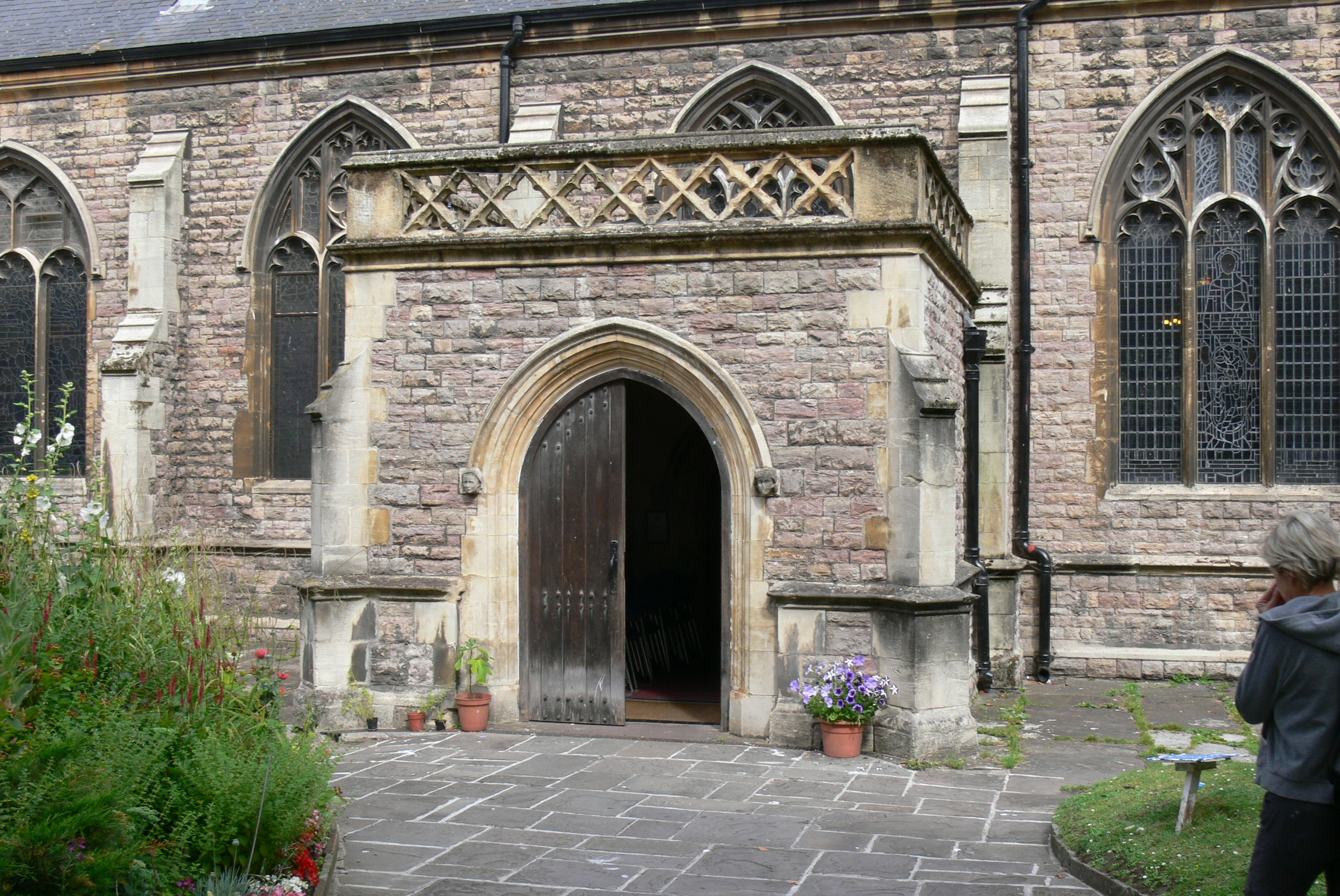
Side entrance

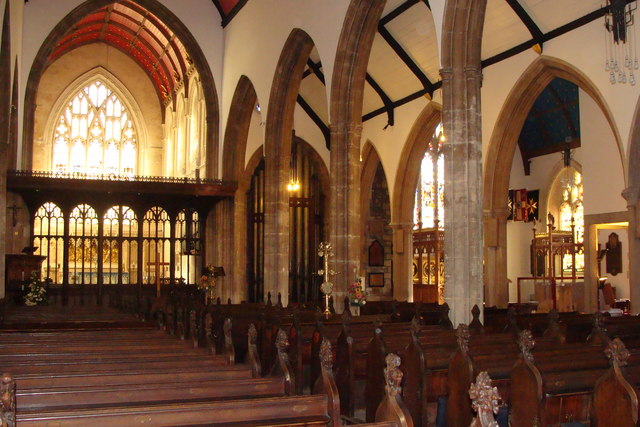
Interior

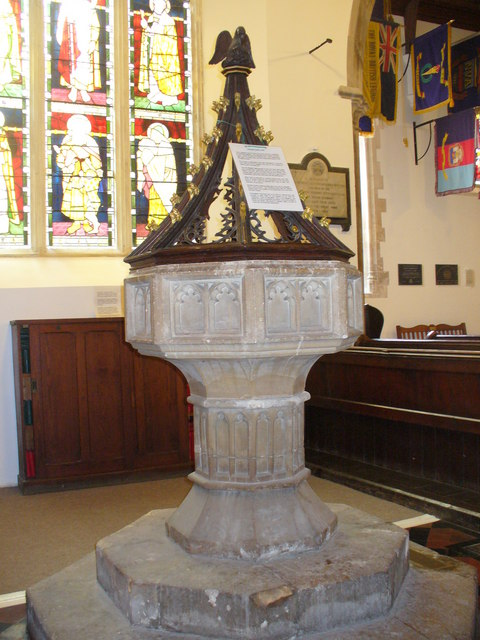
Baptismal font

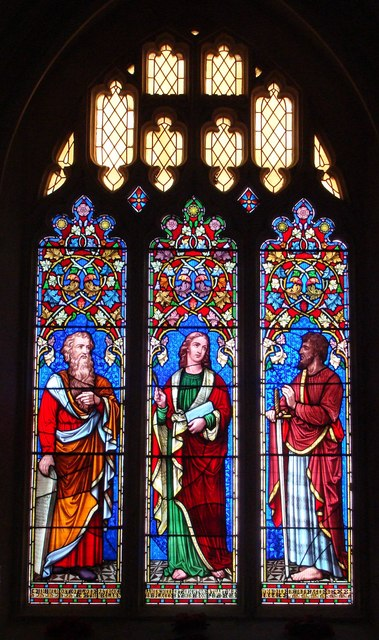
Stained glass window

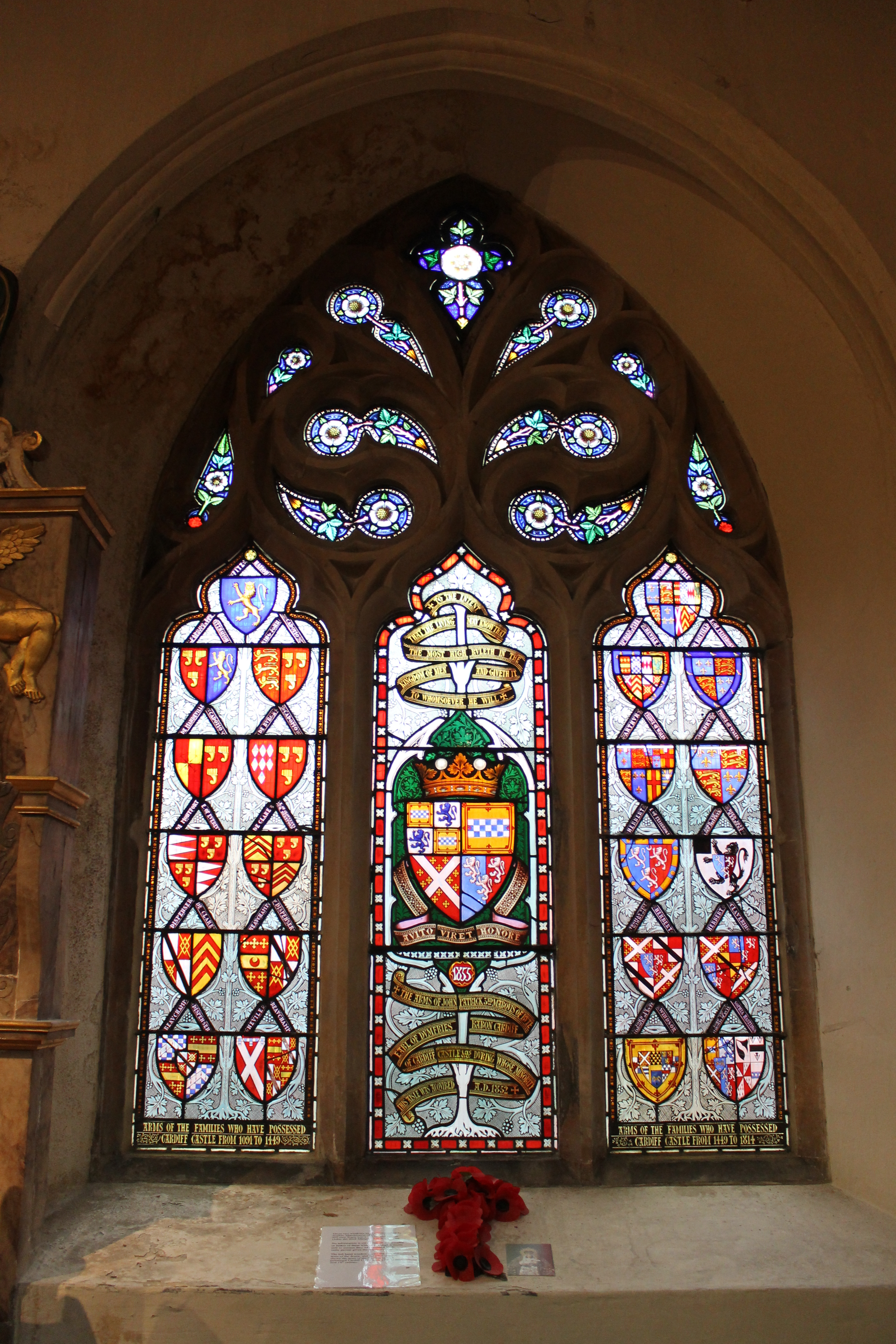
Stained glass window

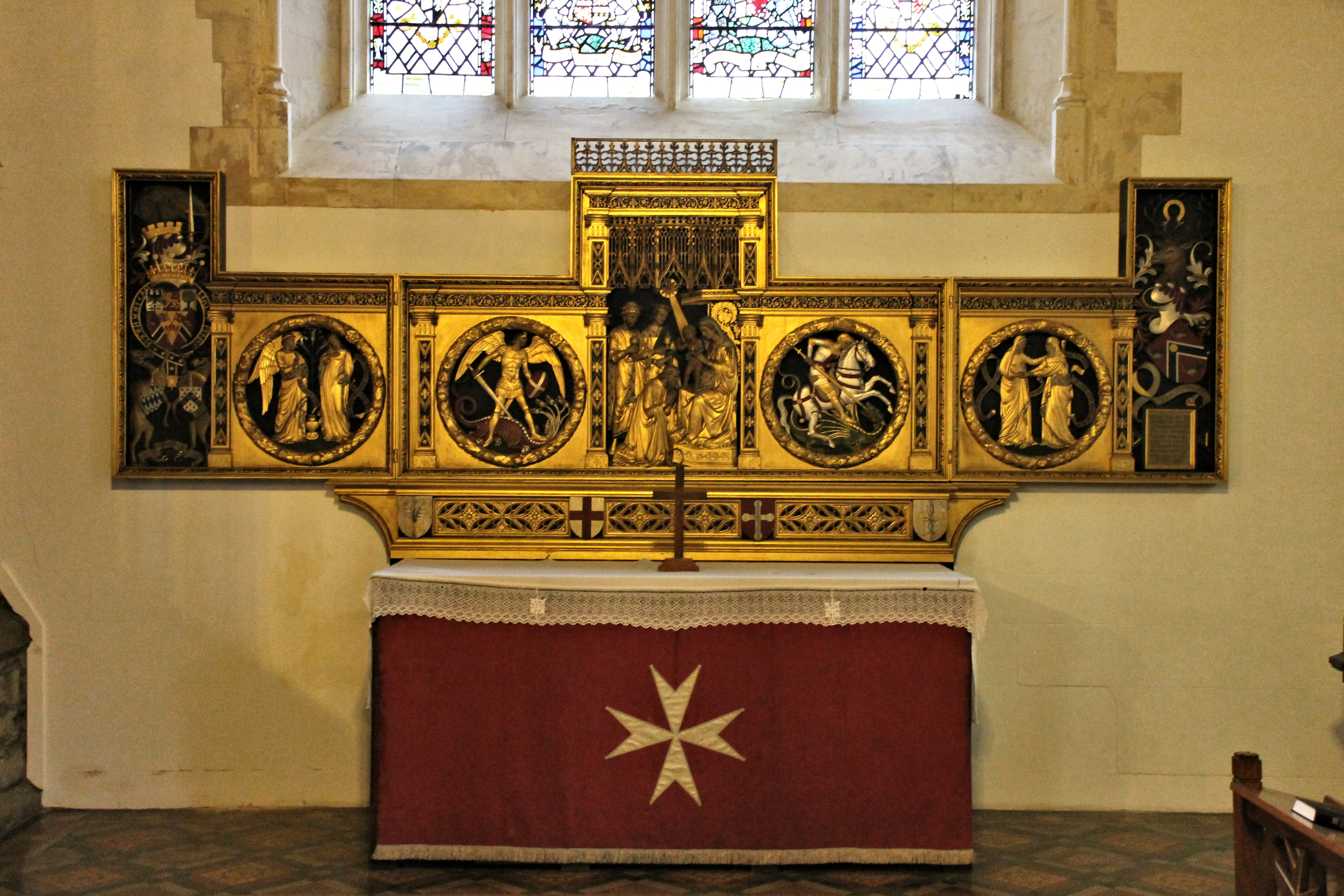
Altar and reredos done as a memorial to Lord Kitchener

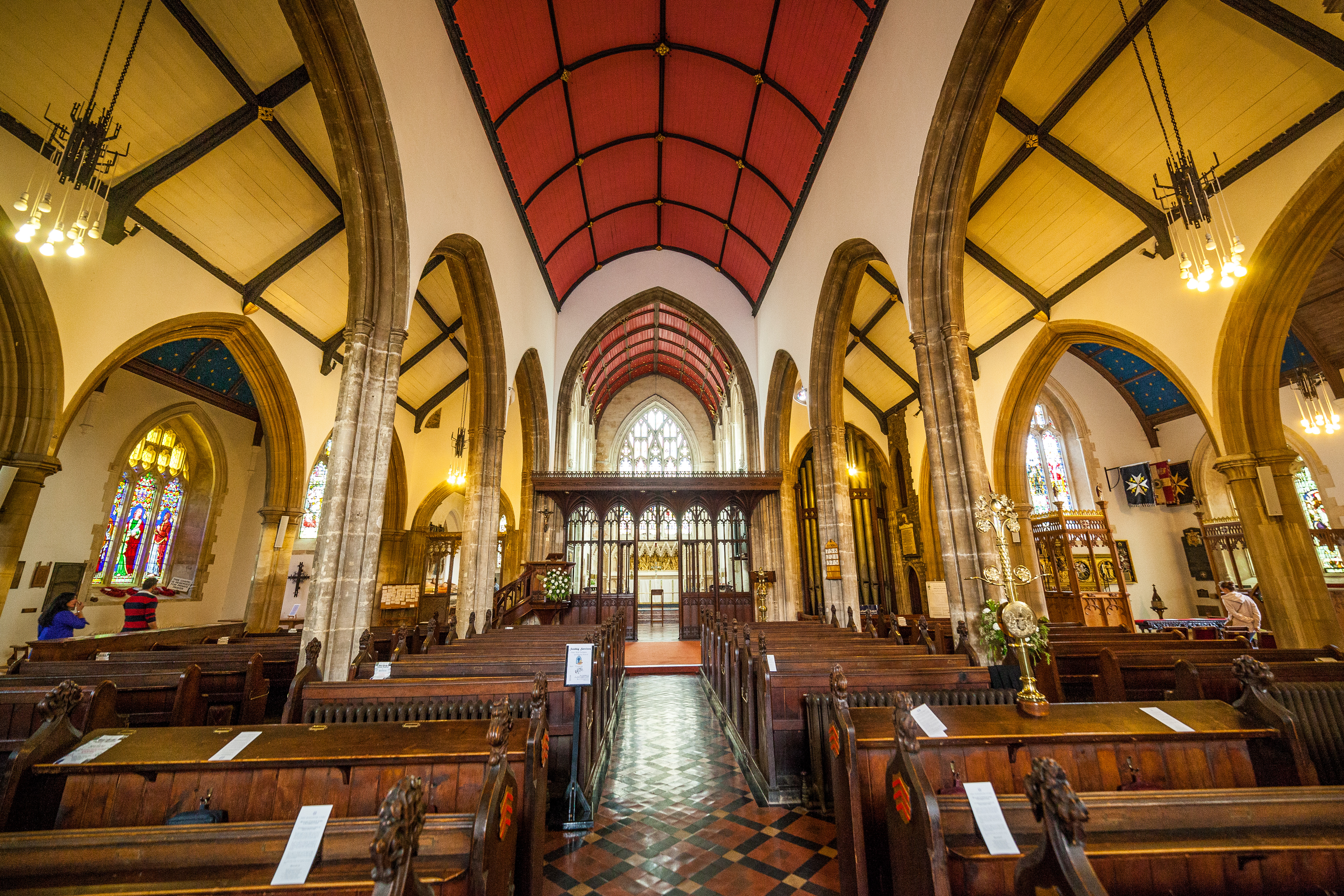
Interior
