= Old Library, Cardiff =

Building in Cardiff, Wales

The Old Library
- Yr Hen Lyfrgell
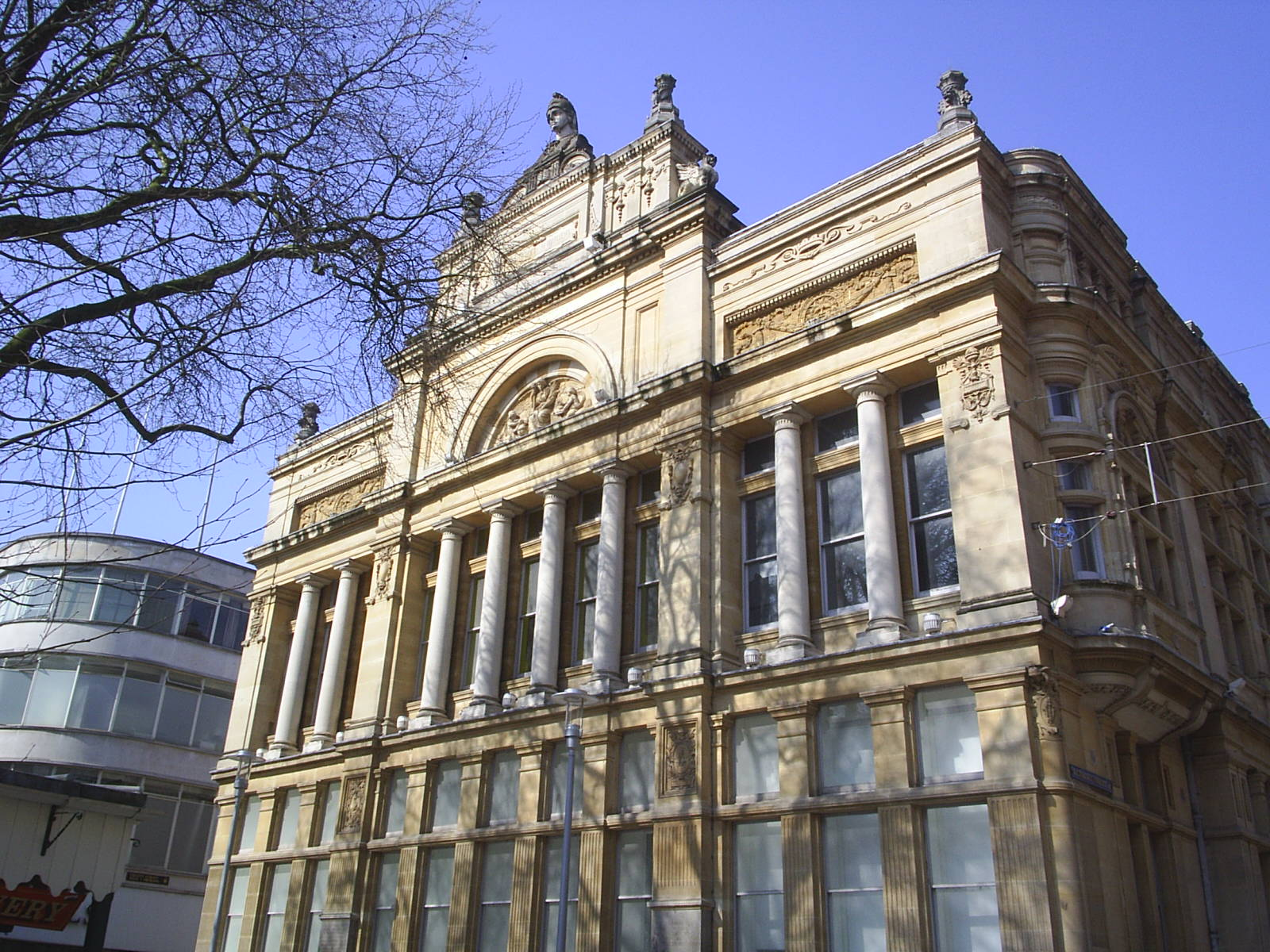
- Interactive map of the The Old Library area
- Former names: Cardiff Free Library; Cardiff Central Library
- Alternative names: Cardiff Story

General information
- Location: The Hayes, Cardiff CF10 1BH, Cardiff, Wales
- Coordinates: 51.4801°N 3.1773°W
- Current tenants: Cardiff Story Museum, Bodlon Gift Shop, Menter Caerdydd, Tourist Information & Luggage Storage, Virgin Money
- Opened: 31 May 1882; 144 years ago
- Owner: Cardiff Council

Design and construction
- Architecture firm: James, Seward and Thomas
- Designations: Grade II* listed

Website
- cardiffmuseum.com mentercaerdydd.org

The Old Library (Welsh: Yr Hen Lyfrgell) is a Grade II* listed building in Cardiff, Wales. It is located in the centre of the city at the northern end of The Hayes. Originally the Cardiff Free Library, it was used as the city's Central Library until it was replaced in 1988. It has been used for other purposes since that time and is currently the home of the Cardiff Story museum and (since 2021) the Royal Welsh College of Music and Drama.

The building is noted for its colonnaded exterior and original tiled entrance corridor.

== Description ==
The 1882 Free Library building was 55 feet north to south, by 108 feet in width, with the public library on the ground floor, the schools on the first floor and the museum on the second floor (partially within the roof space and supported by semi-circular arched iron ribs).

The post-1896 building has two main storeys, plus a basement and the attic space. Built using Bath stone with Portland stone columns, the main south facade is symmetrical in a neoclassical style divided into three bays. The long east and west elevations are of similar materials and composition, but in a French classical style.

The original entrance to the building featured a corridor lined with ornamental wall tiles, designed to depict the four seasons and night and morning. These tiles were impressed with coloured clay to give the impression of a mosaic.

The building's original heaters have been retained and are rare examples of vertical tubed heaters, made by William Graham of London.

The building became Grade II* listed building in 1978, as one of the city's "finest public buildings".

== History ==
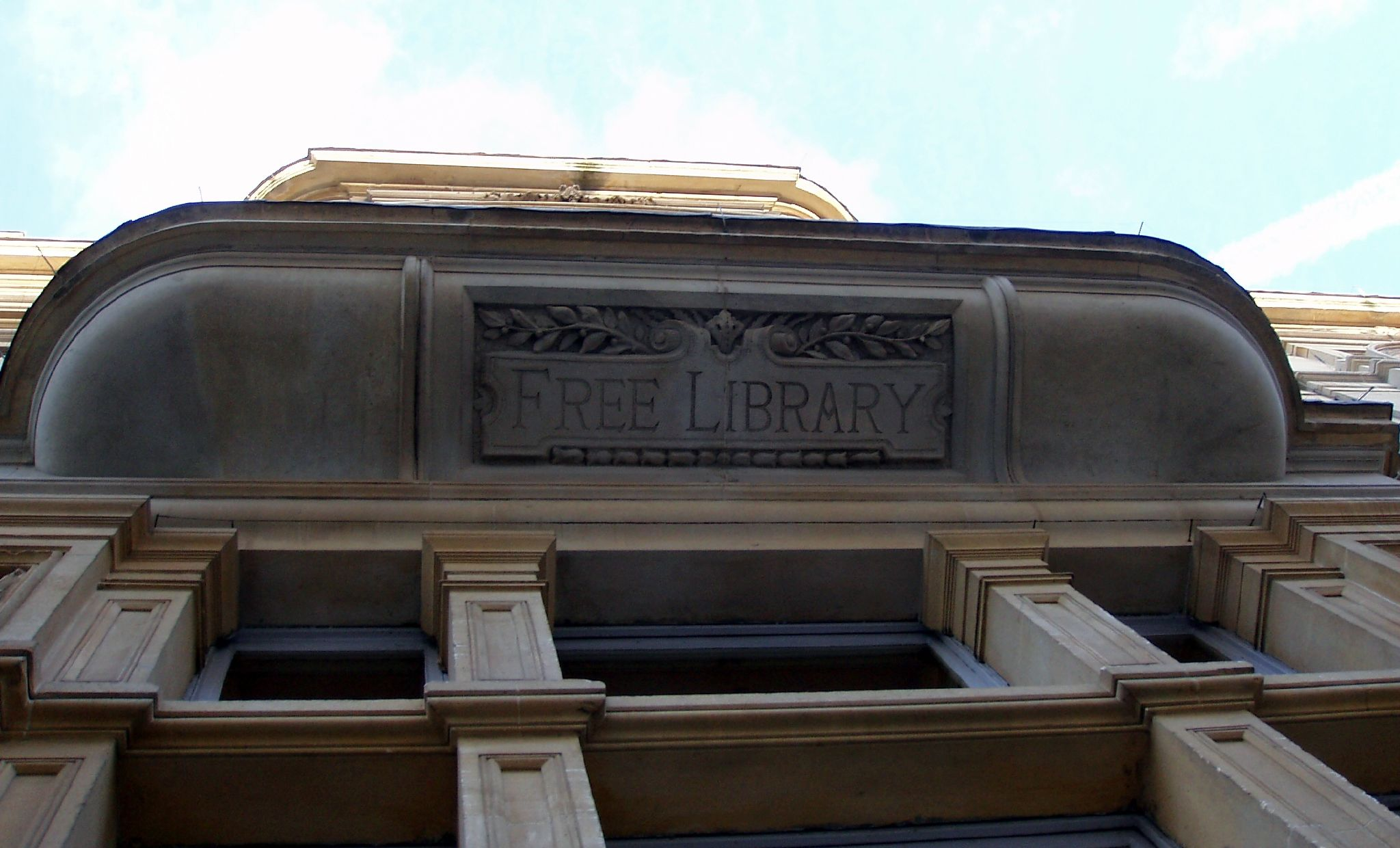
The only sign of the "Free Library" on the building

=== Design, construction and opening ===
Plans for a new "grand and commanding" Cardiff Free Library and Museum were put before Cardiff Town Council in 1874. There were two options for the site, one being owned by Marquess of Bute at the corner of Wood Street and St Mary Street (though and attracting a hefty ground rent), the other owned by the Cardiff Council. Because of the restrictions and costs imposed by the Bute Trustees, the St Mary Street site was rejected in October 1874. In 1879 another option, to rebuild and extend the existing Free Library at the Cardiff Market, was rejected in favour of a Council-owned site on Working Street (which joins The Hayes), with rent-free incentives.

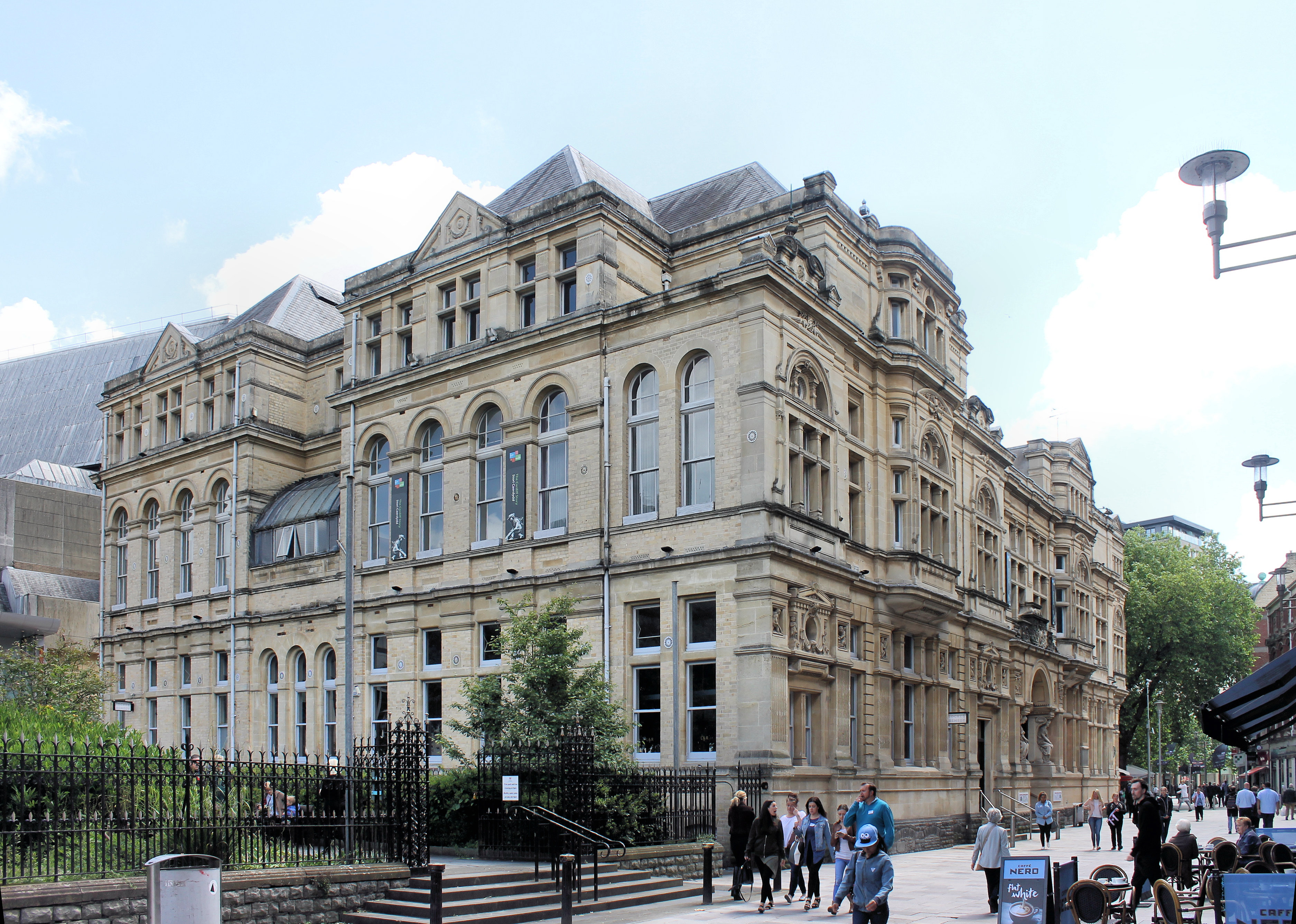
Northern and western ends of the Old Library

A competition was held to choose a design for the new Cardiff Free Library. The winning design was by architects James, Seward and Thomas, and the building was erected between 1880 and 1882 for just over £9,000. The Cardiff Free Library, Museum and Schools for Science and Art (including an art gallery) was opened on 31 May 1882 by the Mayor of Cardiff, Alfred Thomas. The day was declared a public holiday, with the town's shops closed and a procession of over 5000 people making their way through the streets to the library, then dispersing at the Cardiff Arms Park.

The building was further extended to the south fourteen years later, with a new south frontage designed by James, Seward & Thomas and constructed by local builders E Turner & Sons, more than doubling the size of the building to 12,600 square feet at a cost of £45,000. This was officially re-opened by the Prince of Wales on 27 July 1896 at a ceremony in front of almost 700 people assembled in the new reading room. The Prince and Princess of Wales were the subject of the first ever news film shot in Britain during this visit.

=== Library 1924–1988 ===
The Schools of Science and Art were housed in the building until 1890 when it moved to buildings that were part of the University College. The museum contents moved to the National Museum of Wales in 1923. The building subsequently became simply Cardiff Library.

In December 1988 a new Cardiff Central Library opened in Frederick Street and the old library was closed.

=== Post-library history ===
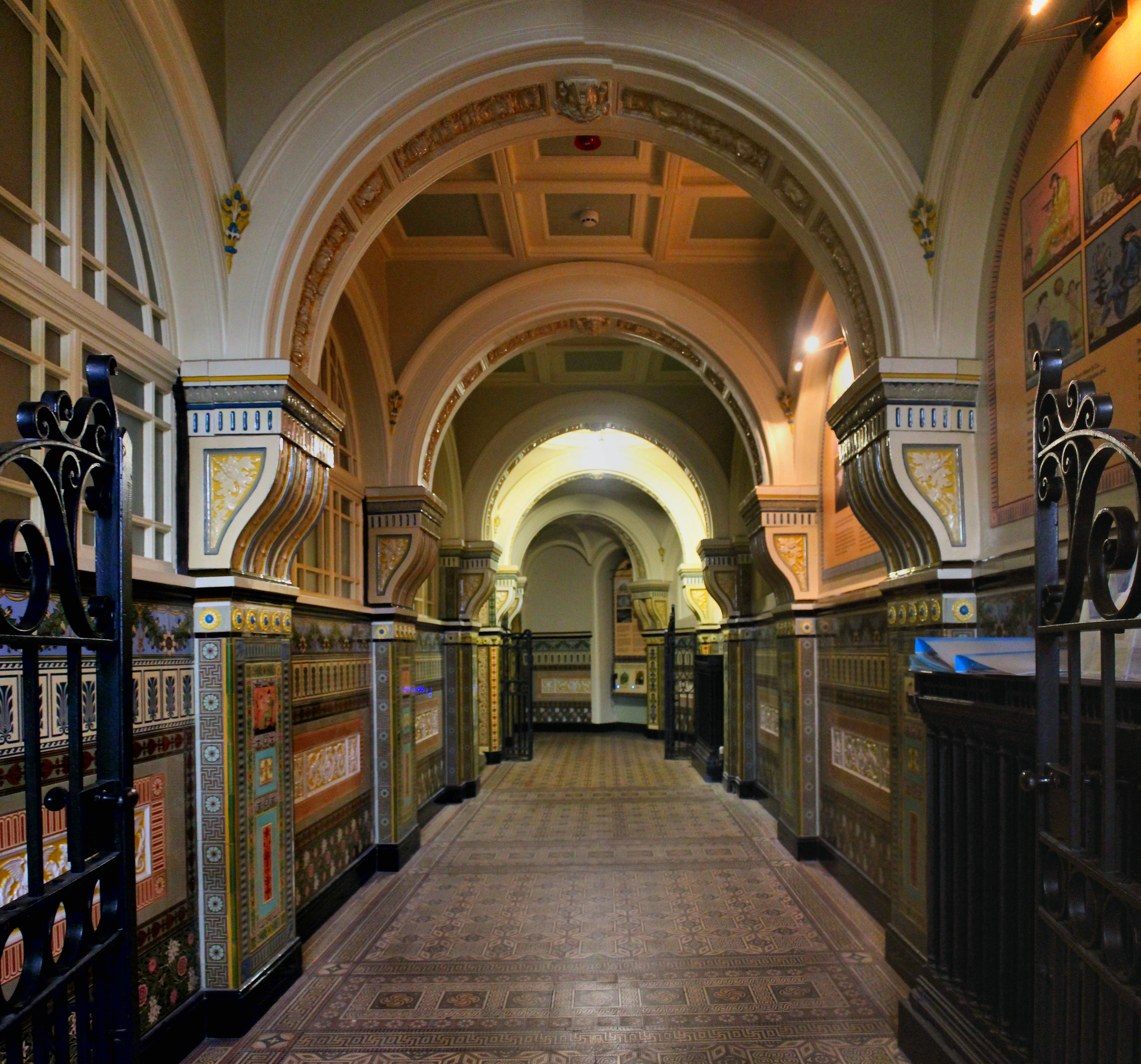
The Tiled Corridor

Following its closure as a library, the Old Library was used for a number of years as artists' studios.

In 1992 a feasibility study was carried out with view to the building becoming an arts centre. After receiving £9 million in grants, a new 'glass box' entrance was created on the east side of the building and the original tiled corridor was closed. The building opened as Cardiff's Centre for Visual Arts (CVA) in 1999. With two galleries totalling 1300 square metres, it became the largest venue for temporary exhibitions in Wales. However, the CVA was heavily criticised by the national press and was short-lived, closing in 2000.

The Old Library was subsequently used for a variety of temporary exhibitions during the 2000s.

In 2015 plans were announced to convert the first floor gallery into a Welsh language centre, with a cafe bar, run by Clwb Ifor Bach, book shop and classrooms. After some delays the centre opened its doors in February 2016. The centre also hosted activities co-ordinated by the organisers of the Tafwyl festival. Courses for Welsh learners were run by Cardiff University during the daytime and evening.

=== Museum of Cardiff ===
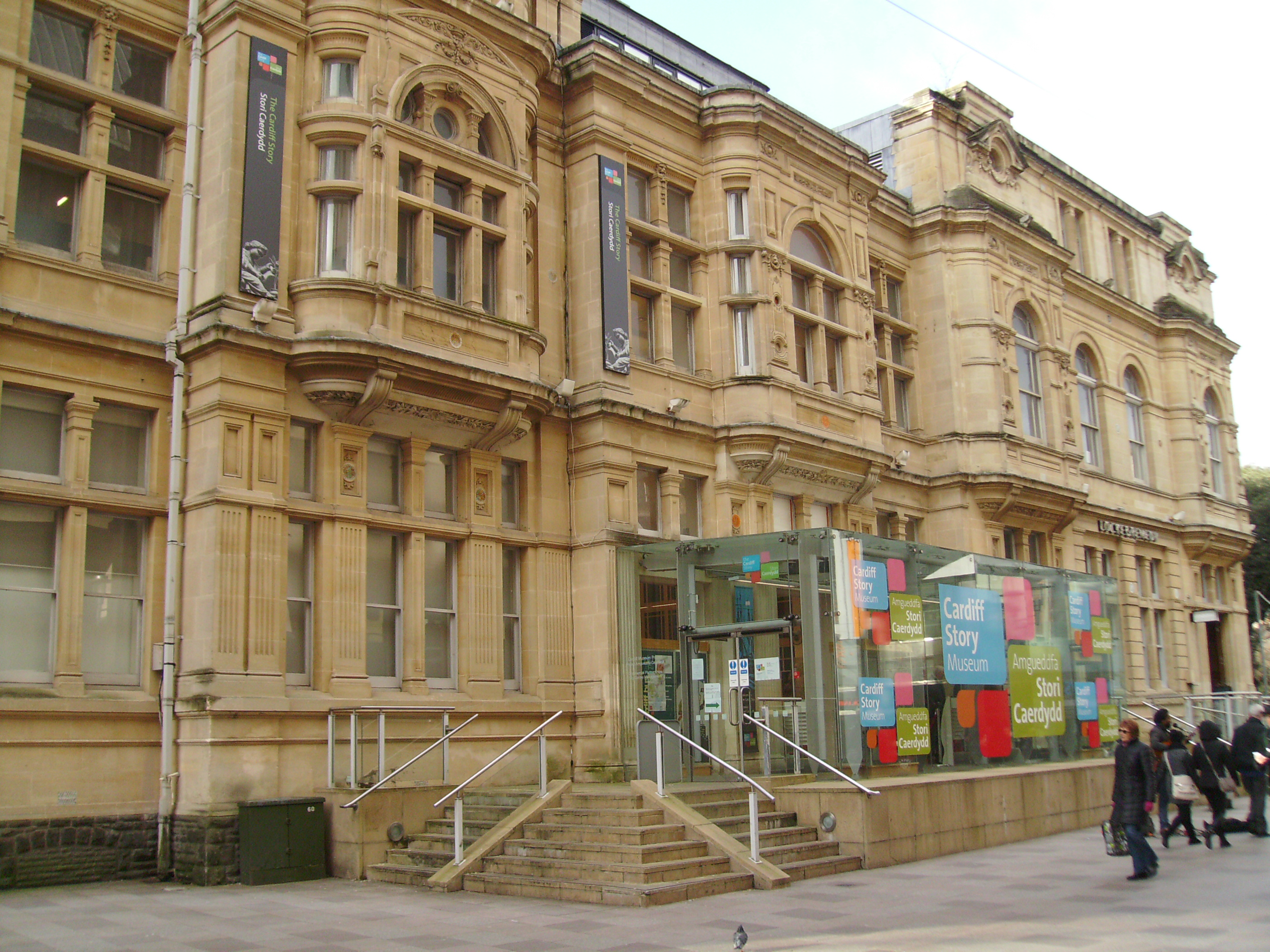
The entrance to the Museum of Cardiff in 2016

In 2011 The Cardiff Story, a permanent "people's museum" of submitted exhibits covering the history of Cardiff, opened on the upper floors and basement. After threats of closure, a new five-year lease was secured in July 2023.

=== Tourist Information Centre ===
A tourist information centre is currently located in the 'glass box' on Working Street. In 2015, due to council budget cuts, this became an unstaffed self-help information station with telephone access to the Wales Millennium Centre's staffed visitor centre in Cardiff Bay.

== Pubs, restaurants and businesses ==
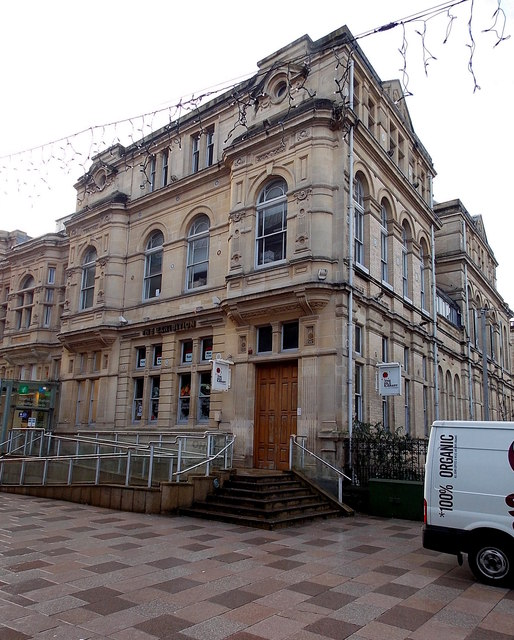
The Exhibition pub

The northern end of the Old Library has housed a number of short-lived pubs and restaurants, including Locke & Remedy, Bar 1876, Big Blue Bar, The Exhibition. These have all subsequently closed, with the location ceasing to be used for bars or restaurants after 2017.

Virgin Money opened its first 'Lounge' in Wales at the location in July 2017.

== Royal Welsh College of Music and Drama ==
In November 2021 the Old Library building was leased in full to the Royal Welsh College of Music & Drama (RWCMD). The building was expected to be used as additional performance spaces for the college. In 2023 RWCMD announced a 5-year plan to transform the library building, with help from a £2 million donation from a local businessman.
