= Museum of Cardiff =

Museum in Cardiff documenting its history

- Amgueddfa Caerdydd

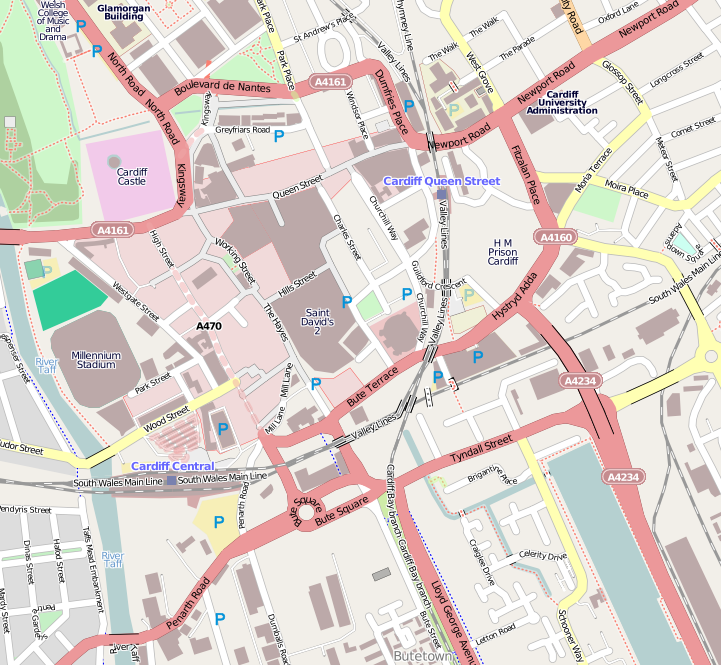
- Location in central Cardiff
- Established: 1 April 2011
- Location: The Hayes, Cardiff, Wales
- Coordinates: 51.479753°N 3.176851°W
- Public transit access: Cardiff Central; Cardiff Queen Street; Cardiff Bus 1,2,8,9/A,11,12,13,28,29/B; Cardiff Bus 35,36,38,39,44,45,49,50
- Website: Cardiff Story

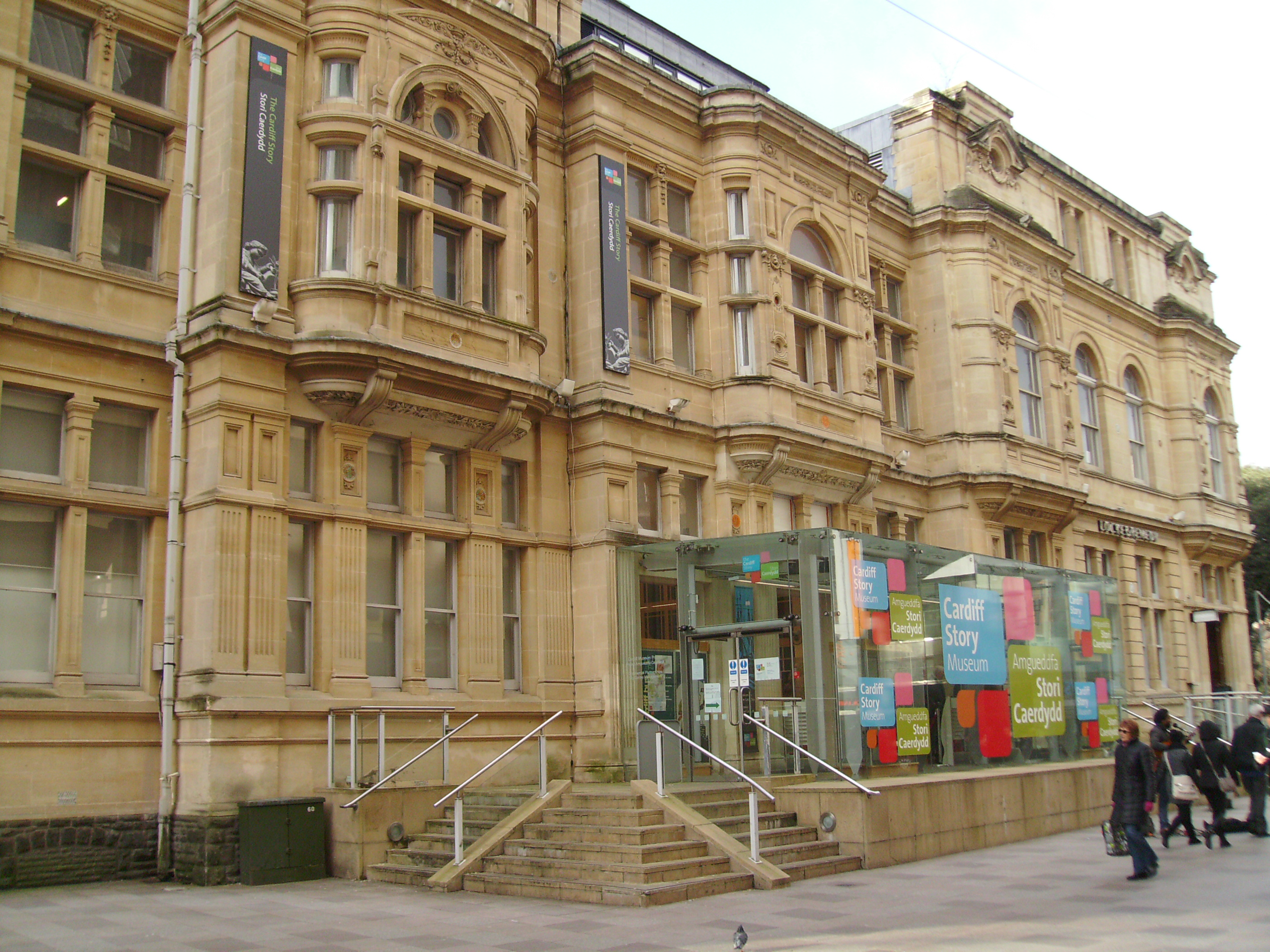
The entrance to the Museum of Cardiff in January 2016

The Museum of Cardiff (Welsh: Amgueddfa Caerdydd) is a museum in Cardiff, Wales that exhibits the history of the city. The museum opened on 1 April 2011 and entrance is free. The museum has a collection of 3,000 objects and Cardiff-related artefacts, many donated from Cardiff residents and communities.

== History ==
=== Old Library (1882–1988) ===
The Museum of Cardiff is situated in the Old Library, at the northern end of The Hayes. The building was opened in 1882 by the Lord Mayor of Cardiff as the Cardiff Free Library, Museum and Schools for Science and Art, which included an art gallery. The Schools of Science and Art were housed in the building until 1890 when it moved to buildings that were part of the University College. The Central Library was moved to a new building located on St David's Link on 3 December 1988.

=== The Cardiff Story Museum ===
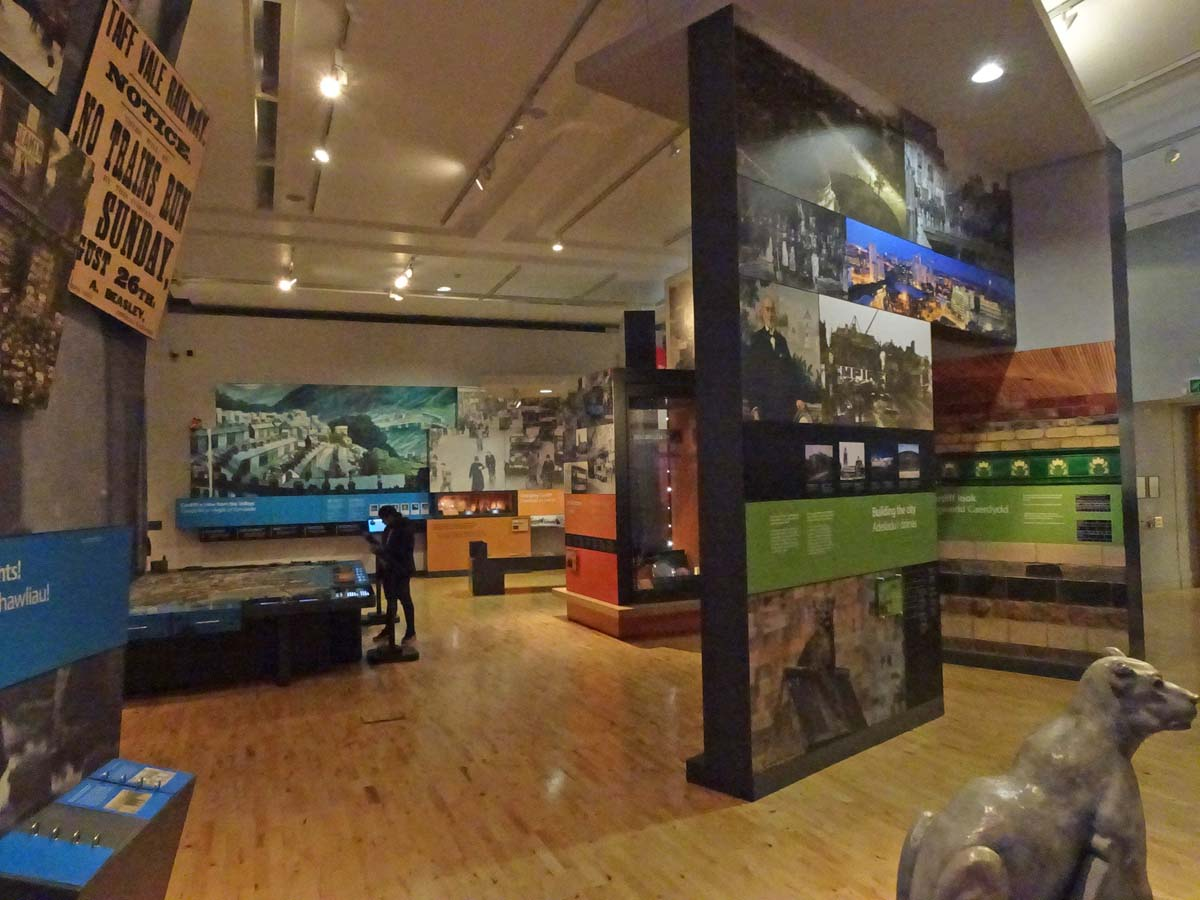
Inside the Museum of Cardiff

Cardiff Council had been seeking the permanent use of the Old Library since the closure of the Cardiff Centre for Visual Arts in 2000.

The Cardiff Strategic Tourism Growth Area Action Plan, supported by Cardiff Council and Wales Tourist Board (now Visit Wales), looked at major elements essential to developing Cardiff as a tourism destination, and came with £2 million funding towards projects from such as the development of a specific Cardiff Museum. As a result, consultants were appointed in 2002 to produce the feasibility study for a Living Museum of Cardiff, jointly funded by Cardiff Council and The Council of Museums in Wales (now CyMAL). The study concluded that an estimated 130,000 visitors per year are expected based on free entry, a city centre site is essential for a museum accessible to visitors and the community, the focus should be on the last 200 years of Cardiff's industrial rise, and that a strong interactive element is essential with things for children to do, such as sound and film.

Proposals for the development of the Museum Project were approved. This included appointing a Museum Project Officer, based in the Old Library, to undertake exhibitions, workshops and consultation with communities and groups to develop material for the full museum. According to a survey of Cardiff citizens, 81.3% were very or fairly likely to visit a museum dedicated to the history of Cardiff.

Centenary celebrations for Cardiff commenced in 2005; Cardiff having become a city in 1905, and the capital city in 1955. Funding from the Millennium Commission and Cardiff Council for celebratory events financed the Museum Project's first exhibition programme. Following on from Moving Stories, Cardiff's Century exhibition opened to give an insight into how the city has changed between 1905 and 2005. 20,947 people visited the exhibition over 6 months. These exhibitions were based on people's stories with educational content and an interactive element. According to a Cardiff Visitor Survey 2005, an annual survey of around 1,000 visitors to Cardiff, 68% of respondents said they are very or fairly likely to visit a Cardiff museum.

In February 2006, a Capital Scheme bid to Cardiff Council was successful. Revenue commitments for developing the project were approved together with agreement in principle to support the capital costs of £4 million.

In March 2006, the South Wales Echo launched Our Cardiff Museum campaign, which asked readers what themes should be included in the final museum, what objects and stories they might have available, and generally voiced strong support.

In April and May 2007, as part of the planning process for the new museum, Redman Design and the Cardiff Museum project brought together a diverse group of 25 people representing local history societies, community organisations, historians, archives, libraries, the media, educators, tourism and artists. The group discussed the ‘why’, ‘who’, ‘what’ and ‘how’ of the museum, coming up with ideas that Redman Design would be able to turn into how the museum could look.

In January 2008, a public consultation was held to see the museum plans so far. Most of the suggestions for themes for the museum were incorporated into the designs. This is in addition to the Access, Learning and Young People's panels and focus groups, who advised on specific aspects of the design and content. In May 2008, the Scheme Design for the museum was completed.

=== Museum of Cardiff ===
In 2019, the Cardiff Story Museum changed its name to the Museum of Cardiff. This was following a public consultation that was held.

In January 2023 Cardiff Council launched a consultation on the future of the museum. One option involved the Museum of Cardiff leaving the Old Library and becoming a mobile exhibition, saving the council a potential £266,000 a year. Protests were held in February, leading to the council deciding to keep the museum in the Old Library while they undertook "a detailed examination" of the best way forward. A new five-year lease was secured in July 2023.

== Previous exhibitions ==
The venue has hosted several exhibitions before its inauguration as a museum.

The first Cardiff Museum Project exhibition, Moving Stories 1905–2005, opened at the Old Library. During its 6-month run it attracted 16,873 visits.

The Cardiff’s War: 1939–1945 exhibition featured at the Old Library in January 2006, attracting 10,390 visits in just 6 weeks.

River and Rail, how Isambard Kingdom Brunel shaped Cardiff exhibition opened in October 2006.

Roots to Cardiff featured at the museum between February and June 2007. Preparations included interviews with people who would feature in the exhibition, as well as uncovering some interesting objects such as a Gypsy caravan, lent by the Travellers' Education Service. There is a long tradition of Gypsy families coming to Cardiff as part of their nomadic life.

Bats, Boots and Balls: the highs and lows of sport in Cardiff, closed in November 2007 with over 14,000 visits. Voting for Cardiff ’s Sporting Great in the exhibition was heated but the winner was Colin Jackson, followed by Ryan Giggs and Fred Keanor.

Fury of the Waters: how Cardiff faced the floods exhibition opened on 15 December 2007. The exhibition weighed up the evidence for the Great Flood of 1607 being caused by a tsunami or a storm surge. The exhibition also features the skeleton of Billy the Seal, on loan from National Museum Cardiff. Over 11,000 people visited the exhibition in the first three months ago and over the Easter holidays the Environment Agency Wales held a Flood Awareness Roadshow in the gallery. Visitors were able to search on a computer to find out whether their house is at risk of flooding, and took away freebies to make their own ‘emergency flood kit’.

When We Were Young: growing up in Cardiff opened in July 2008. The exhibition brought together a range of stories about growing up in Cardiff over the past 150 years, including work, school, leisure and home life.

== Opening ==
Cardiff Story opened in April 2011 together with an exhibition, Big Little City, featuring memories, stories and photos submitted by local residents. It was officially opened by the Duchess of Cornwall at the end of June 2011.
