= Marquess of Bute =

British title of nobility

Marquessate of the County of Bute
- Arms of the Marquess of Bute: Quarterly, 1st & 4th, Or, a Fess chequy Azure and Argent within a Double-Tressure flory counterflory Gules (for Stuart); 2nd & 3rd,, Argent a Lion rampant Azure (for Crichton).
- Creation date: 2 February 1796
- Created by: King George III
- Peerage: Peerage of Great Britain
- First holder: John Stuart, 4th Earl of Bute
- Present holder: John Bryson Crichton-Stuart, 8th Marquess of Bute
- Remainder to: the 1st Marquess's heirs male of the body lawfully begotten
- Subsidiary titles: Lord Crichton of Sanquhar; Lord Mount Stuart; Baron Cardiff; Viscount of Kingarth; Viscount Mountjoy; Earl of Bute; Earl of Windsor; Earl of Dumfries
- Status: Extant
- Seat: Mount Stuart House
- Former seats: Cardiff Castle, Dumfries House, Castell Coch, House of Falkland, Luton Hoo
- Motto: Over the centre Crest: NOBILIS EST IRA LEONIS (The wrath of the lion is noble); Over the dexter Crest: GOD SEND GRACE; Over the sinister Crest: Avito viret honore (He flourishes in ancestral honour)
- Currently the Earldom of Dumfries resides with the Marquesses of Bute. However, it can be inherited through the female line through an amendment to its original creation.

Marquess of the County of Bute, shortened in general usage to Marquess of Bute, is a title in the Peerage of Great Britain. It was created in 1796 for John Stuart, 4th Earl of Bute.

== Family history ==
John Stuart was the member of a family that descended from John Stewart (1360–1449), Sheriff of Bute, a natural son of Robert II of Scotland and his mistress Moira Leitch, married to Janet Sympil and, in 1407, to Elizabeth Graham. This John Stewart was granted the lands of Bute, Arran and Cumbrae by his father. He was known as the 'Black Stewart' because of his dark complexion; his brother John Stewart of Dundonald was known as the 'Red Stewart'. The grant of lands was confirmed in 1400 by a charter of Robert III. About 1385, John Stewart of Bute was granted the hereditary office of Sheriff of Bute by his father Robert II. He died in 1449, aged 89.

At about the time of Mary, Queen of Scots, the family adopted the spelling of 'Stuart', which she had used while living in France. James Stuart, seventh in descent from the Black Stewart, was created a Baronet, of Bute, in the Baronetage of Nova Scotia on 28 March 1627. His grandson, the third Baronet, represented Bute in the Parliament of Scotland and was one of the Commissioners that negotiated the Union between Scotland and England. On 14 April 1703, he was raised to the Peerage of Scotland as Earl of Bute, Viscount of Kingarth, and Lord Mount Stuart, Cumra and Inchmarnock. He was succeeded by his son, the 2nd Earl of Bute and 4th Baronet, who sat in the House of Lords as a Scottish representative peer and served as Lord-Lieutenant of Buteshire.

On his early death, the titles passed to his son, the third Earl. He became a politician and favourite of George III and served as Prime Minister of Great Britain from 1762 to 1763. Lord Bute married Mary, a daughter of Edward Wortley Montagu and his wife the writer Lady Mary Wortley Montagu. In 1761, Lord Bute's wife Mary was raised to the Peerage of Great Britain in her own right as Baroness Mount Stuart, of Wortley in the County of York, with remainder to the heirs male of her body by her then husband Lord Bute. Her son became the first Marquess of Bute, whose eldest son and heir John Stuart, Lord Mount Stuart (who predeceased his father) married Lady Elizabeth Penelope, daughter and heiress of Patrick McDouall-Crichton, 6th Earl of Dumfries. Lord Mount Stuart's eldest son John succeeded his maternal grandfather as seventh Earl of Dumfries in 1803, and his paternal grandfather as second Marquess of Bute in 1814. In 1805, he assumed by Royal licence the additional surname of Crichton before Stuart. He was succeeded by his only child, the third Marquess. He was an antiquarian, scholar, philanthropist and architectural patron and also held the post of Lord-Lieutenant of Buteshire. It was the 3rd Marquess who, in 1868, first converted to Catholicism, since which time the family have remained of that faith. His son the fourth Marquess was also Lord-Lieutenant of Buteshire.

His grandson, John Crichton-Stuart, 6th Marquess of Bute, succeeded his father and was Lord-Lieutenant of Buteshire from 1967 to 1975. As of 2021, the peerages are held by the latter's grandson, John Crichton-Stuart, 8th Marquess of Bute.

This chest is on display at the Colintraive Hotel in Colintraive, Argyll and Bute

=== Bute family titles ===
The Marquesses of Bute have important ancestors not only in Scotland but also in Wales, including the first Lord Herbert of Cardiff, son and heir of Richard Herbert of Ewyas. He was also created Earl of Pembroke. After the Stuart Restoration, most of the Herbert family property was sold, and the rest was owned by Thomas, Viscount Windsor, who married Charlotte, the only child of Philip Herbert, 7th Earl of Pembroke. In 1766, Viscount Windsor's granddaughter, Charlotte Jane, was married to John Stuart, Lord Mount Stuart (1744-1814), the son and heir of the 3rd Earl of Bute, prime minister from 1762 to 1763, and through this marriage great estates in south Wales came into the Bute family. In 1776, sixteen years before he succeeded his father as Earl of Bute, he was raised to the Peerage of Great Britain in his own right as Baron Cardiff, of Cardiff Castle in the County of Glamorgan, in recognition of his substantial Welsh estates. In 1796, he was further honoured when he was created Earl of Windsor and Viscount Mountjoy, on the Isle of Wight; revivals of the titles once held by his wife's family, and Marquess of Bute. These titles are also in the Peerage of Great Britain.

== Other offices and duties ==
The Marquess of Bute is the hereditary keeper of Rothesay Castle, a privilege granted to the ancestor of the Earls and Marquesses of Bute, John Stewart, by Robert II during the 14th century. In this capacity, the Crichton-Stuart family had been responsible for the upkeep and restoration of the castle until the 1960s.

This branch of the Stewart (also Stuart) family previously held the office of Hereditary High Steward of Scotland, an office now held by the Duke of Rothesay in his capacity as a direct descendant of the House of Stuart.

== Other family members ==
Robert Stuart, a younger son of the first Baronet, was created a Baronet in his own right in 1707. The Hon. James Stuart-Mackenzie, a younger son of the second Earl, succeeded to the Mackenzie estates through his paternal grandmother and assumed by Royal licence the additional surname of Mackenzie. He was a member of parliament.

The Hon. James Stuart-Wortley-Mackenzie, second son of the third Earl, was a politician and the father of James Stuart-Wortley, 1st Baron Wharncliffe. Lieutenant-General Sir Charles Stuart, fourth son of the third Earl, was a distinguished soldier and the father of Charles Stuart, 1st Baron Stuart de Rothesay. The Most Reverend the Hon. William Stuart, fifth son of the third Earl, was Archbishop of Armagh. His son Sir William Stuart was a member of parliament. His eldest son William Stuart also sat as a member of parliament. Lady Louisa Stuart, daughter of the third Earl, was a writer.

Lord Evelyn Stuart, second son of the first Marquess, was a soldier and politician. Lord Henry Crichton-Stuart, third son of the first Marquess, was the father of Henry Villiers-Stuart, 1st Baron Stuart de Decies (see the Baron Stuart de Decies for more information on this branch of the family). Lord William Stuart, fourth son of the first Marquess, was a captain in the Royal Navy and Member of Parliament. Lord George Stuart (1780–1841), fifth son of the first Marquess, was a rear-admiral in the Royal Navy. Lord Dudley Stuart, sixth son of the first Marquess (and eldest from his second marriage), was a member of parliament.

Lord Patrick Crichton-Stuart, second son of Lord Mount Stuart, eldest son of the first Marquess, was Member of Parliament for Cardiff. His eldest son James Crichton-Stuart also represented this constituency in Parliament. Lord Ninian Crichton-Stuart, second son of the third Marquess, was also Member of Parliament for Cardiff before his early death in the First World War. Lord Colum Crichton-Stuart, third and youngest son of the third Marquess, sat as Member of Parliament for Northwich for many years. Lord Robert Crichton-Stuart, second son of the fourth Marquess, was Lord-Lieutenant of Buteshire. Lord Rhidian Crichton-Stuart, fifth and youngest son of the fourth Marquess, was a British member of the International Legislative Assembly of the Tangier International Zone.

The Earls and Marquesses of Bute originally used the courtesy title Lord Mount Stuart for the heir apparent. After the Earldom of Dumfries was inherited by the second Marquess, the heir apparent has been styled Earl of Dumfries and his heir apparent is styled Lord Mount Stuart. However, the current Marquess John Bryson Crichton-Stuart was styled as Lord Mount Stuart for some years after his father inherited the marquessate in 1993. This was because his father was well known at the time as Johnny Dumfries, Earl of Dumfries. Subsequently, the seventh Marquess became known as John or Johnny Bute and his heir adopted Jack Dumfries for short.

== Heraldic achievement (coat of arms) ==
Coat of arms of the Marquess of Bute
Coronet A Coronet of a Marquess Escutcheon Quarterly, 1st & 4th, Or, a Fess chequy Azure and Argent within a Double-Tressure flory counterflory Gules (for Stuart); 2nd & 3rd,, Argent a Lion rampant Azure (for Crichton). Supporters Dexter: A Stag proper, attired and gorged with an Earl's Coronet Or, having therefrom a chain reflexed over the back Gules; Sinister: A Horse Argent, bridled Gules. Motto Over the centre Crest: NOBILIS EST IRA LEONIS (The wrath of the lion is noble), Over the dexter Crest: GOD SEND GRACE, Over the sinister Crest: Avito viret honore (To flourish in an honourable ancestry) Other elements Behind the shield placed in saltire, a Key Or, having within its handle a Fess chequy Azure and Argent, and a Rod Gules, surmounted with a Tower Argent, masoned Sable, conically capped loopholes and port Gules (being the Insignia of the Office of the Hereditary Keeper of Rothesay Castle).

== Seat ==
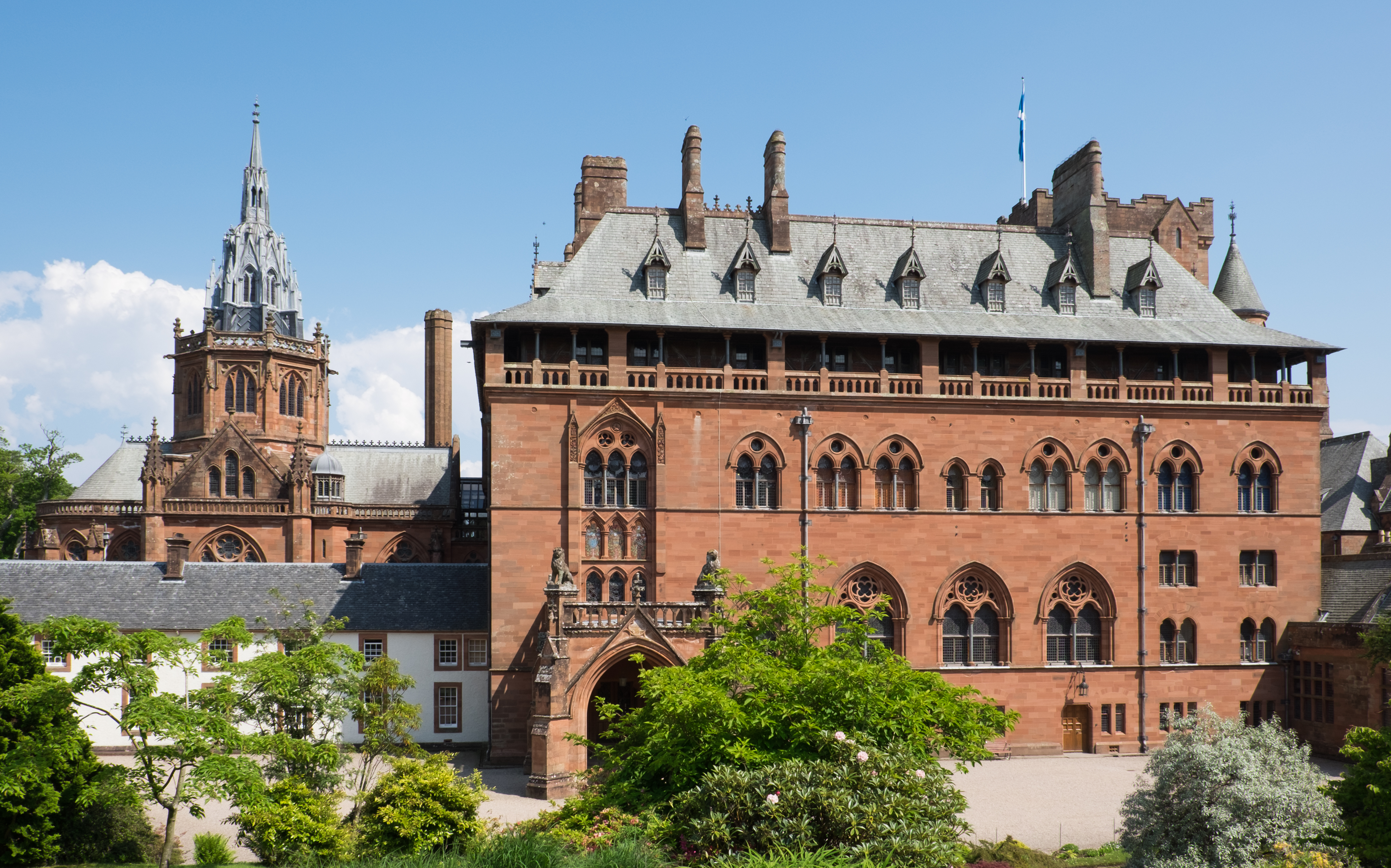
West front, showing one of the wings surviving from the previous house

=== Mount Stuart House ===
Mount Stuart House is the seat of the family of the Stuarts of Bute, on land that has been in the family since 1157, on the Isle of Bute. James Stuart, 2nd Earl of Bute, built a new Georgian house here, and this was finished in 1719. In 1877, it was damaged by fire, although the walls and most of the contents survived the blaze. A new Victorian Mount Stuart House was then built and was the first in Scotland to have electric lighting throughout, as well as having the world's first heated pool.

Although Mount Stuart House is the family seat of the Marquesses of Bute, the Mount Stuart Trust has operated it as a business since 1989.

== Former seats ==
=== Dumfries House ===
In 1814, Dumfries House, near Cumnock, East Ayrshire, was inherited by John Crichton-Stuart, 2nd Marquess of Bute, and the property remained in the Crichton-Stuart family for two centuries. In 1885, the 3rd Marquess of Bute commissioned Robert Weir Schultz to design the pavilions. The heads of the Crichton-Stuart family had their main residence at Mount Stuart House on the Isle of Bute. In the later 20th century, the house was inhabited by the Dowager Marchioness of Bute, Lady Eileen, until her death in 1993. The 6th Marquess died a few months later and the house passed to her grandson the 7th Marquess; the racing driver known as John Bute.

Because of maintenance problems, in 2003 the 7th Marquess decided to sell Dumfries House and to send the contents to auction. However, Charles III, (then)-Prince of Wales was able to arrange for the sale of the house, its contents, and its 2000-acre estate to a consortium of organisations, including the Scottish Government, the Art Fund, the Garfield Weston Foundation, the Monument Trust, the National Heritage Memorial Fund, and Save Britain's Heritage. The Prince's Charities Foundation borrowed much of the £45m total sale price.

=== Cardiff Castle ===
The 3rd Marquess worked with the architect William Burges in creating two Gothic revival castles in south Wales. The Work of William Burges at Cardiff Castle has been remodelled from the original Roman fort and the later Norman motte-and-bailey. It passed through the hands of many noble families until, in 1766, it passed by marriage to the Bute family. The 2nd Marquess of Bute was key in the development of south Wales as one of the biggest coal exporters in its time by developing the port and Cardiff docks. Cardiff castle was inherited by his son John, the 3rd Marquess of Bute, who was extremely wealthy. The project began in 1866 with the architect William Burges who transformed the castle grounds. Within the two towers, one of which is a clock, he also designed expert interiors, with murals, stained glass, marble, gilding and elaborate wood carvings. The rooms included are the Mediterranean gardens and Italian, then also Arabian winter smoking room within the Herbert tower. Despite both previous Marquesses dying in their 50s, the project was completed by the 4th Marquess. Then, after the death of the 4th Marquess of Bute, the family gave the castle and its surrounding parks to city of Cardiff. For a quarter of a century, the Castle was leased by the National College of Music and Drama and, since 1974, Cardiff Castle has become one of Wales’s most popular tourist destinations.

=== Castell Coch ===
The Herbert family ruins were acquired by the Earls of Bute in 1760 when John, 3rd Earl of Bute, married Lady Charlotte Windsor, sharing her inheritance in south Wales. His grandson, The 2nd Marquess of Bute, whose wealth came from Cardiff Docks, eventually inherited the castle. The 2nd Marquess carried out exploration for iron ore at Castell Coch in 1827 and considered establishing an ironworks there.

The 3rd Marquess of Bute, another John Crichton-Stuart, inherited Castell Coch and the family estates as a child in 1848. On his coming of age, Bute's landed estates and industrial inheritance made him one of the wealthiest men in the world. He had a wide range of interests including archaeology, theology, linguistics and history. In 1850 the antiquarian George Clark surveyed Castell Coch and published his findings, the first major scholarly work about the castle. Castell Coch has been occupied for over 700 years, the previous owner being the De Clare Family. The castle was rarely used and given to the British Government by the 5th Marquess in 1950.

== Stuart Baronets of Bute (1627) ==
- Sir James Stuart, 1st Baronet (died 1662)
- Sir Dugald Stuart, 2nd Baronet (died 1670)
- Sir James Stuart, 3rd Baronet (died 1710) (created Earl of Bute in 1703)

== Earls of Bute (1703) ==
- James Stuart, 1st Earl of Bute (died 1710)
- James Stuart, 2nd Earl of Bute (died 1723)
- John Stuart, 3rd Earl of Bute (1713–1792)
- John Stuart, 4th Earl of Bute (1744–1814) (created Marquess of Bute in 1796)

== Marquesses of Bute (1796) ==
- John Stuart, 1st Marquess of Bute (1744–1814)
- John Crichton-Stuart, 2nd Marquess of Bute (1793–1848) (had succeeded as Earl of Dumfries in 1803)
- John Patrick Crichton-Stuart, 3rd Marquess of Bute (1847–1900)
- John Crichton-Stuart, 4th Marquess of Bute (1881–1947)
- John Crichton-Stuart, 5th Marquess of Bute (1907–1956)
- John Crichton-Stuart, 6th Marquess of Bute (1933–1993)
- John Colum Crichton-Stuart, 7th Marquess of Bute (1958–2021)
- John Bryson Crichton-Stuart, 8th Marquess of Bute (born 1989)

== Present peer ==
John Bryson Crichton-Stuart, 8th Marquess of Bute (born 21 December 1989) is the son of the 7th Marquess and his wife Carolyn E. R. M. Waddell. He was styled as Lord Mount Stuart from 1993.

On 22 March 2021 he succeeded his father as Marquess of Bute (G.B., 1796), Earl of Dumfries (S., 1633), Earl of Bute (S., 1703), Earl of Windsor (G.B., 1796), Viscount Ayr (S., 1622), Viscount Kingarth (S., 1703), Viscount Mountjoy (G.B., 1796), Lord Crichton of Sanquhar (S., 1488), Lord of Sanquhar (S., 1622), Lord Crichton of Sanquhar and Cumnock (S., 1633), Lord Mountstuart, Cumra and Inchmarnock (S., 1703), Baron Mount Stuart of Wortley (G.B., 1761), and Baron Cardiff of Cardiff Castle (G.B., 1776). He also became the 14th Stuart baronet in the baronetage of Nova Scotia (1627).

Line of succession (simplified)
- John Stuart, 3rd Earl of Bute (1713–1792)
  - John Stuart, 1st Marquess of Bute (1744–1814)
    - John Stuart (1767–1794) "Lord Mount Stuart"
      - John Crichton-Stuart, 2nd Marquess of Bute (1793–1848)
        - John Patrick Crichton-Stuart, 3rd Marquess of Bute (1847–1900)
          - John Crichton-Stuart, 4th Marquess of Bute (1881–1947)
            - John Crichton-Stuart, 5th Marquess of Bute (1907–1956)
              - John Crichton-Stuart, 6th Marquess of Bute (1933–1993)
                - John Colum Crichton-Stuart, 7th Marquess of Bute (1958–2021)
                  - John Crichton-Stuart, 8th Marquess of Bute (b. 1989)
                - (2). Anthony Crichton-Stuart (b. 1961)
                  - (3). Arthur Alec Crichton-Stuart (b. 2001)
              - David Ogden Crichton-Stuart (1933–1977)
                - (4). Kenneth Edward David Crichton-Stuart (b. 1975)
              - James Charles Crichton-Stuart (1935–1982)
                - (5). William Henry Crichton-Stuart (b. 1971)
                - (6). Hugh Bertram Crichton-Stuart (b. 1973)
                - (7). Alexander Blane Crichton-Stuart (b. 1982)
                  - (8). James Callum Crichton-Stuart (b. 2024)
            - Robert Crichton-Stuart (1909–1976)
              - Henry Colum Crichton-Stuart (1938–2019)
                - male issue and descendants in remainder
            - Patrick Crichton-Stuart (1913–1956)
              - Charles Patrick Colum Henry Crichton-Stuart (1939–2001)
                - male issue and descendants in remainder
            - Rhidian Crichton-Stuart (1917–1969)
              - Frederick John Patrick Crichton-Stuart (1940–2011)
                - male issue and descendants in remainder
          - Ninian Crichton-Stuart (1883–1915)
            - Michael Duncan David Crichton-Stuart (1915–1981)
              - Ninian Stuart (b. 1957)
                - male issue and descendants in remainder
      - Patrick Crichton-Stuart (1794–1859)
        - James Crichton-Stuart (1824–1891)
          - Patrick James Crichton-Stuart (1868–1935)
            - Patrick Dudley Crichton-Stuart (1909–1978)
              - male issue and descendants in remainder
    - Henry Stuart (1777–1809)
      - William Villiers-Stuart (1804–1873)
        - Henry John Richard Villiers-Stuart (1837–1914)
          - John Patrick Villiers-Stuart (1879–1958)
            - John Michael Villiers-Stuart (1927–1986)
              - male issue and descendants in remainder
    - George Stuart (1780–1841)
  - James Stuart-Wortley-Mackenzie (1747–1818)
    - line of Barons and Earls of Wharncliffe

== Barons Mount Stuart (1761) ==
- Mary Stuart, 1st Baroness Mount Stuart (1718–1794)
- John Crichton-Stuart, 4th Earl of Bute, 2nd Baron Mount Stuart (1744–1814) (created Marquess of Bute in 1796)

See above for further succession

== Family tree ==
Earls and Marquesses of Bute, Earls of Dumfries, Earls of Stair, and Earls of Windsor family tree

Lord Crichton of Sanquhar, 1488
William Crichton (d. 1550); 5th Lord Crichton of Sanquhar
Robert Crichton (d. 1561); 6th Lord Crichton of Sanquhar	Edward Crichton (d. 1569); 7th Lord Crichton of Sanquhar	William Crichton
Viscount of Ayr and Lord Sanquhar, 1622; Earl of Dumfries and Lord Crichton of Sanquhar and Cumnock; 1633
James Stuart; 1st Baronet d. 1662	Robert Crichton (d. 1612); 8th Lord Crichton of Sanquhar	William Crichton; 1578–1643; 1st Earl of Dumfries, etc. 9th Lord Crichton of Sanquhar
Baronet Dalrymple of Stair, 1664; Viscount of Stair and Lord Glenluce and Stranraer; 1690
Dugald Stuart; 2nd Baronet d. 1670	William Crichton; 1598–1691; 2nd Earl of Dumfries, etc. 10th Lord Crichton of Sanquhar	James Dalrymple; 1619–1695; 1st Viscount of Stair, etc.
Earl of Bute, Viscount of Kingarth, and Lord Mount Stuart, Cumra and Inchmarnock, 1703	Earl of Stair, Viscount of Dalrymple and Lord Newliston, Glenluce and Stranraer, 1703	Dalrymple Baronet of Cranstoun, 1698
James Stuart; 1661–1710; 1st Earl of Bute, etc.	Charles Chricton styled Lord Crichton	John Dalrymple; 1648–1706/1707; 1st Earl of Stair, etc. 2nd Viscount of Stair, etc.	James Dalrymple d. 1719; 1st Dalrymple Baronet of Cranstoun
James Stuart d. 1722/1723; 2nd Earl of Bute, etc.	John Dalrymple; 1673–1747; 2nd Earl of Stair, etc. 3rd Viscount of Stair, etc.	Penelope Crichton; 1682–1741/1742 suo jure 4th Countess of Dumfries, etc. 12th Lady Crichton of Sanquhar	William Dalrymple; 1678–1744	William Crichton d. 1694; 3rd Earl of Dumfries, etc. 11th Lord Crichton of Sanquhar	George Dalrymple; 1680-1745	John Dalrymple d. 1743; 2nd Dalrymple Baronet of Cranstoun
John Stuart; 1713–1792; 3rd Earl of Bute, etc. m. Mary Montagu (1718–1794), 1st Baroness Mount Stuart of Wortley, (GB 1761)	Elizabeth Crichton Dalrymple	James Dalrymple d. 1760; 3rd Earl of Stair, etc. 4th Viscount of Stair, etc.	William Dalrymple-Crichton; 1699–1768; 5th Earl of Dumfries, etc. 4th Earl of Stair, etc. 5th Viscount of Stair, etc. 12th Lord Crichton of Sanquhar	John Dalrymple; 1720–1789; 5th Earl of Stair, etc. 6th Viscount of Stair, etc.	William Dalrymple; 1736–1807	William Dalrymple; 1704–1771; 3rd Dalrymple Baronet of Cranstoun
Baron Cardiff, of Cardiff Castle in the County of Glamorgan, 1776; Marquess of Bute, Earl of Windsor and Viscount Mountjoy (3rd creation); 1796
John Stuart; 1744–1814; 1st Marquess of Bute, etc. 4th Earl of Bute, etc., 2nd Baron Mount Stuart of Wortley	Patrick McDouall-Crichton; 1726–1803; 6th Earl of Dumfries, etc. 13th Lord Crichton of Sanquhar	John Dalrymple; 1749–1821; 6th Earl of Stair, etc. 7th Viscount of Stair, etc.	John Dalrymple-Hamilton-Makgill; 1726–1810; 4th Dalrymple Baronet of Cranstoun
Baron Oxenfoord, of Cousland in the County of Edinburgh, 1841
John Stuart; 1767–1794 styled Viscount Mount Stuart	Elizabeth Penelope McDouall-Crichton; 1772–1797	John William Henry Dalrymple; 1784–1840; 7th Earl of Stair, etc. 8th Viscount of Stair, etc.	John Hamilton Dalrymple; 1771–1853; 8th Earl of Stair, etc. 9th Viscount of Stair, etc. 5th Baronet Dalrymple; 1st Baron Oxenfoord	North Hamilton Dalrymple; 1776–1864; 9th Earl of Stair, etc. 10th Viscount of Stair, etc. 2nd Baron Oxenfoord; 6th Dalrymple Baronet of Cranstoun
John Crichton-Stuart; 1793–1848; 2nd Marquess of Bute, etc. 5th Earl of Bute, etc. 7th Earl of Dumfries, etc. and Baronet Stuart of Bute; 14th Lord Crichton of Sanquhar; 3rd Baron Mount Stuart of Wortley	John Hamilton Dalrymple; 1819–1903; 10th Earl of Stair, etc. 11th Viscount of Stair, etc. 3rd Baron Oxenfoord; 7th Dalrymple Baronet of Cranstoun
John Patrick Crichton-Stuart; 1847–1900; 3rd Marquess of Bute, etc. 6th Earl of Bute, etc. 8th Earl of Dumfries, etc. and Baronet Stuart of Bute; 15th Lord Crichton of Sanquhar; 4th Baron Mount Stuart of Wortley, Cumra and Inchmarnock	John Hew North Gustav Henry Hamilton-Dalrymple; 1848–1914; 11th Earl of Stair, Viscount Dalrymple, and Lord Newliston; 12th Viscount of Stair, etc. 4th Baron Oxenfoord, Glenluce and Stranraer; 8th Dalrymple Baronet of Cranstoun
John Patrick Crichton-Stuart; 1881–1947; 4th Marquess of Bute, etc. 7th Earl of Bute, etc. 9th Earl of Dumfries, etc. and Baronet Stuart of Bute; 16th Lord Crichton of Sanquhar; 5th Baron Mount Stuart of Wortley	John James Hamilton Dalrymple; 1879–1961; 12th Earl of Stair, etc. 13th Viscount of Stair, etc. 5th Baron Oxenfoord; 9th Dalrymple Baronet of Cranstoun
John Crichton-Stuart; 1907–1956; 5th Marquess of Bute, etc. 10th Earl of Dumfries, etc. and Baronet Stuart of Bute; 8th Earl of Bute, etc. 17th Lord Crichton of Sanquhar; 6th Baron Mount Stuart of Wortley	John Aymer Dalrymple; 1906–1996; 13th Earl of Stair, etc. 14th Viscount of Stair, etc. 6th Baron Oxenfoord; 10th Dalrymple Baronet of Cranstoun
John Crichton-Stuart; 1933–1993; 6th Marquess of Bute, etc. 9th Earl of Bute, etc. 11th Earl of Dumfries, etc. 11th Baronet Stuart of Bute; 18th Lord Crichton of Sanquhar; 7th Baron Mount Stuart of Wortley
John Colum Crichton-Stuart; 1958–2021; 7th Marquess of Bute, etc. 10th Earl of Bute, etc. 12th Earl of Dumfries, etc. 19th Lord Crichton of Sanquhar; 8th Baron Mount Stuart of Wortley	Anthony Crichton-Stuart b. 1961	John David James Dalrymple b. 1961; 14th Earl of Stair, etc. 15th Viscount of Stair, etc. 7th Baron Oxenfoord; 11th Dalrymple Baronet of Cranstoun
Caroline Crichton-Stuart b. 1984	John Bryson Crichton-Stuart b. 1989; 8th Marquess of Bute, etc. 11th Earl of Bute, etc. 13th Earl of Dumfries, etc. and Baronet Stuart of Bute; 20th Lord Crichton of Sanquhar; 9th Baron Mount Stuart of Wortley	Arthur Alec Crichton-Stuart b. 2001	John James Thomas Dalrymple b. 2008 styled Viscount Dalrymple; Heir apparent to the Earldom of Stair

== See also ==
- Earl of Dumfries
- Viscount Windsor
- Earl of Wharncliffe
- Baron Stuart de Decies
- Baron Stuart of Wortley
- Stuart Baronets
- Clan Stuart of Bute
