= Earl of Stair =

Title in the Peerage of Scotland

Earldom of Stair
- Blazon: Arms: Quarterly: 1st grandquarter, Or on a Saltire Azure nine Lozenges of the field (Dalrymple); 2nd grandquarter, Or a Chevron chequy Sable and Argent between three Water Bougets of the second (Ross); 3rd grandquarter, quarterly: 1st and 4th counterquartered: 1st and 4th, Gules three Cinquefoils Ermine; 2nd and 3rd, Argent a Galley sails furled Sable; the whole within a Bordure compony Argent and Azure, the first charged with Hearts Gules and the second with Mullets Argent (Hamilton of Bargany); 2nd and 3rd, Gules on a Fess between three Crescents Or as many Mullets Azure (de Franquetot); 4th grandquarter, quarterly: 1st and 4th, Gules on a Chevron between three Cinquefoils Argent as many Round Buckles Azure (Hamilton of Fala); 2nd and 3rd, Gules three Martlets Argent (Makgill); Crest:A Rock proper; Supporters: On either side a Stork holding in its beak a Fish all proper
- Creation date: 8 April 1703
- Created by: Queen Anne
- Peerage: Peerage of Scotland
- First holder: John Dalrymple, 1st Earl of Stair
- Present holder: John James David Dalrymple, 14th Earl of Stair
- Heir apparent: John James Thomas Dalrymple, Viscount Dalrymple
- Subsidiary titles: Viscount of Stair; Viscount Dalrymple; Baron Oxenfoord of Cousland; Lord Newliston, Glenluce and Stranraer; Lord Glenluce and Stranraer; Baronet Dalrymple of Stair; Baronet Dalrymple of Cranstoun
- Status: Extant
- Seats: Lochinch Castle; Oxenfoord Castle
- Motto: FIRM

Arms of the Earl of Stair

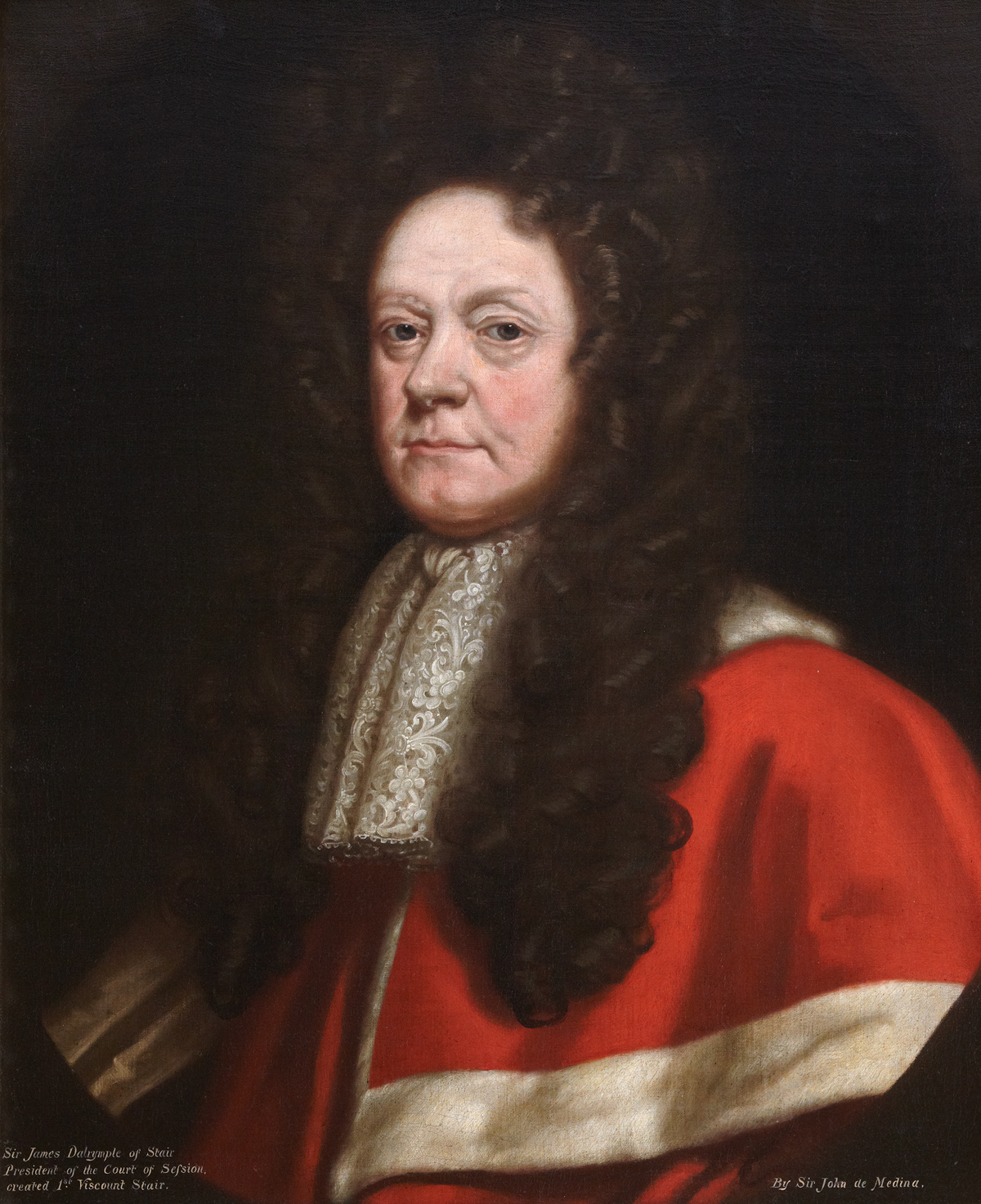
James Dalrymple, 1st Viscount of Stair

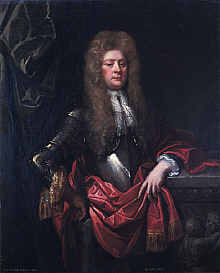
John Dalrymple, 1st Earl of Stair

Earl of Stair is a title in the Peerage of Scotland. It was created in 1703 for the lawyer and statesman John Dalrymple, 2nd Viscount of Stair.

Dalrymple's father, James Dalrymple, had been a prominent lawyer; having served as Lord President of the Court of Session, he was created a baronet, of Stair in the County of Ayr, in the Baronetage of Nova Scotia in 1664, and in 1690 he was raised to the Peerage of Scotland as Lord Glenluce and Stranraer and Viscount of Stair.

The son, John Dalrymple, actively supported William of Orange's claim to the throne and served as Secretary of State. However, he was forced to resign after he authorised the massacre of Glencoe of 1692. He was made Lord Newliston, Glenluce and Stranraer and Viscount of Dalrymple, at the same time as he was given the earldom, also in the Peerage of Scotland. All three titles were created with remainder, in default of male issue of his own, to the heirs male of his father.

The first Earl of Stair was succeeded by his eldest son, the second Earl. He was a prominent soldier and served as Commander-in-Chief of the Forces. In 1707 Lord Stair surrendered all his honours to the Crown, and obtained a new charter empowering him to name as his successor any male descendant of the first Viscount of Stair. In 1747, shortly before his death, he nominated his nephew John Dalrymple (d. 1789), second son of his third brother George Dalrymple (d. 1745). This was mostly because his second brother Colonel the Hon. William Dalrymple (d. 1744) (heir presumptive to the peerages from 1707 to 1744) had married Penelope Crichton, 4th Countess of Dumfries, a peeress in her own right. This nomination was contested and the House of Lords decided in favour of James Dalrymple (d. 1760), the second son of the aforementioned Colonel the Hon. William Dalrymple by his wife the Countess of Dumfries. The House of Lords decided in 1748 in this case that the power of nomination could not be validly exercised after the Union. On his uncle's death in 1747 James succeeded as third Earl of Stair.

He was childless and was succeeded by his elder brother, the fourth Earl, who had already succeeded his mother as fifth Earl of Dumfries. He was also childless and on his death in 1768 the two earldoms separated. He was succeeded in the earldom of Dumfries by his nephew Patrick McDouall(-Crichton) (see the Earl of Dumfries for later history of this title). The earldom of Stair and its subsidiary titles were passed on to his cousin, the aforementioned John Dalrymple, the fifth Earl, who in 1747 had been nominated for the earldom by his uncle the second Earl. He was succeeded by his son, the sixth Earl. He sat in the House of Lords as a Scottish representative peer from 1793 to 1807 and from 1820 to 1821 and also served as Ambassador to Prussia.

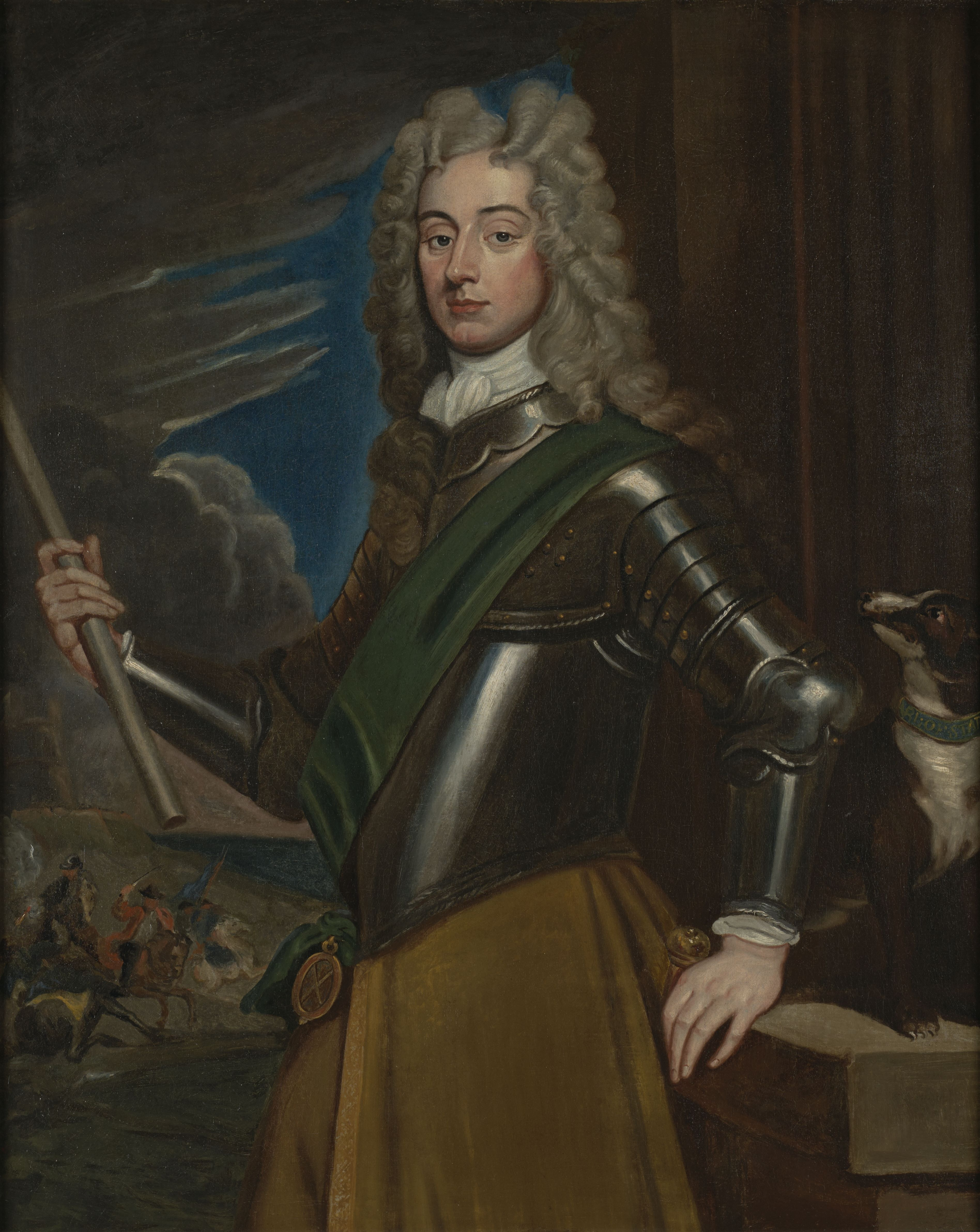
John Dalrymple, 2nd Earl of Stair

He died childless and was succeeded by his cousin, the seventh Earl. He was the son of General William Dalrymple. He also died without issue and was succeeded by his distant relative Sir John Hamilton Dalrymple, 5th Baronet, of Killock, who became the eighth Earl of Stair (see below for earlier history of the baronetcy). Lord Stair was a General in the Army and also sat as Member of Parliament for Edinburgh. In 1841 he was created Baron Oxenfoord, of Cousland in the County of Edinburgh, in the Peerage of the United Kingdom, with remainder to his brother. This peerage gave the Earls an automatic seat in the House of Lords. The Oxenfoord title was in honour of his property Oxenfoord Castle, and the title held by his wife's family, the Viscounts of Oxfuird (or Oxenfoord). He was succeeded by his younger brother (in the barony of Oxenfoord according to the special remainder), the ninth Earl.

His son, the tenth Earl, represented Wigtownshire in the House of Commons as a Conservative and served as Lord Lieutenant of Ayrshire and Wigtownshire. His grandson, the twelfth Earl, also sat as Conservative Member of Parliament for Wigtownshire and served as Lord Lieutenant of Wigtownshire. On his death the titles passed to his son, the thirteenth Earl. He was also Lord Lieutenant of Wigtownshire. As of 2007 the titles are held by his eldest son, the fourteenth Earl, who succeeded in 1996. In May 2008 the fourteenth Earl was elected to sit as a Hereditary Cross-Bench Peer in the House of Lords following the death of Baroness Darcy de Knayth.

The Dalrymple Baronetcy, of Killock, was created in the Baronetage of Nova Scotia in 1698 for James Dalrymple, second son of the first Viscount of Stair. His great-grandson, the fourth Baronet, was a Baron of the Court of Exchequer in Scotland. He married his cousin Elizabeth Macgill, the heir and representative of the Viscounts of Oxfuird (or Oxenfoord). Their son, the aforementioned fifth Baronet, succeeded his kinsman as Earl of Stair in 1840. See above for further history of the baronetcy.

Another member of the Dalrymple family was Hew Dalrymple, third son of the first Viscount of Stair. He served as Lord President of the Session under the judicial title Lord North Berwick. In 1697 he was created a baronet, of North Berwick in the County of Haddington, in the Baronetage of Nova Scotia. His second son Hew Dalrymple was the great-grandfather of Robert Dalrymple-Horn-Elphinstone, who was created a baronet, of Horn, and Logie Elphinstone in the County of Aberdeen, in 1828. See Dalrymple baronets for more information on these branches of the family.

The title of the earldom comes from the hamlet of Stair, the ancestral home of the Dalrymple family who settled there in the 12th century. To facilitate the original title, in 1653 James Dalrymple, 1st Viscount Stair, had a portion of Ochiltree severed so as to create the Parish of Stair.

The family seat is Lochinch Castle near Stranraer, Wigtownshire and Oxenfoord Castle, near Pathhead, Midlothian.

== Viscounts of Stair (1690) ==
- James Dalrymple, 1st Viscount of Stair (1619–1695)
- John Dalrymple, 2nd Viscount of Stair (created Earl of Stair in 1703)

== Earls of Stair (1703) ==
- John Dalrymple, 1st Earl of Stair (1648–1707)
- John Dalrymple, 2nd Earl of Stair (1673–1747)
- James Dalrymple, 3rd Earl of Stair (died 1760)
- William Dalrymple-Crichton, 5th Earl of Dumfries and 4th Earl of Stair (1699–1769)
- John Dalrymple, 5th Earl of Stair (1720–1789)
- John Dalrymple, 6th Earl of Stair (1749–1821)
- John William Henry Dalrymple, 7th Earl of Stair (1784–1840); most notable for having his 1808 marriage to Lady Laura Manners ended by divorce in 1809 and annulled when a previous marriage contract in 1804 to another woman was revealed. That first marriage was annulled in 1820, but the Earl never remarried. He was succeeded by a distant cousin.
- John Hamilton Dalrymple, 8th Earl of Stair (1771–1853)
- North Hamilton Dalrymple, 9th Earl of Stair (1776–1864)
- John Hamilton Dalrymple, 10th Earl of Stair (1819–1903)
- John Hew North Gustav Henry Hamilton-Dalrymple, 11th Earl of Stair (1848–1914)
- John James Dalrymple, 12th Earl of Stair (1879–1961)
- John Aymer Dalrymple, 13th Earl of Stair (1906–1996)
- John David James Dalrymple, 14th Earl of Stair (born 1961)

The heir apparent is the present holder's son, John James Thomas Dalrymple, Viscount Dalrymple (born 2008).

== Family tree ==
Earls and Marquesses of Bute, Earls of Dumfries, Earls of Stair, and Earls of Windsor family tree

Lord Crichton of Sanquhar, 1488
William Crichton (d. 1550); 5th Lord Crichton of Sanquhar
Robert Crichton (d. 1561); 6th Lord Crichton of Sanquhar | Edward Crichton (d. 1569); 7th Lord Crichton of Sanquhar | William Crichton
Viscount of Ayr and Lord Sanquhar, 1622; Earl of Dumfries and Lord Crichton of Sanquhar and Cumnock; 1633
James Stuart; 1st Baronet d. 1662 | Robert Crichton (d. 1612); 8th Lord Crichton of Sanquhar | William Crichton; 1578–1643; 1st Earl of Dumfries, etc. 9th Lord Crichton of Sanquhar
Baronet Dalrymple of Stair, 1664; Viscount of Stair and Lord Glenluce and Stranraer; 1690
Dugald Stuart; 2nd Baronet d. 1670 | William Crichton; 1598–1691; 2nd Earl of Dumfries, etc. 10th Lord Crichton of Sanquhar | James Dalrymple; 1619–1695; 1st Viscount of Stair, etc.
Earl of Bute, Viscount of Kingarth, and Lord Mount Stuart, Cumra and Inchmarnock, 1703 | Earl of Stair, Viscount of Dalrymple and Lord Newliston, Glenluce and Stranraer, 1703 | Dalrymple Baronet of Cranstoun, 1698
James Stuart; 1661–1710; 1st Earl of Bute, etc. | Charles Chricton styled Lord Crichton | John Dalrymple; 1648–1706/1707; 1st Earl of Stair, etc. 2nd Viscount of Stair, etc. | James Dalrymple d. 1719; 1st Dalrymple Baronet of Cranstoun
James Stuart d. 1722/1723; 2nd Earl of Bute, etc. | John Dalrymple; 1673–1747; 2nd Earl of Stair, etc. 3rd Viscount of Stair, etc. | Penelope Crichton; 1682–1741/1742 suo jure 4th Countess of Dumfries, etc. 12th Lady Crichton of Sanquhar | William Dalrymple; 1678–1744 | William Crichton d. 1694; 3rd Earl of Dumfries, etc. 11th Lord Crichton of Sanquhar | George Dalrymple; 1680-1745 | John Dalrymple d. 1743; 2nd Dalrymple Baronet of Cranstoun
John Stuart; 1713–1792; 3rd Earl of Bute, etc. m. Mary Montagu (1718–1794), 1st Baroness Mount Stuart of Wortley, (GB 1761) | Elizabeth Crichton Dalrymple | James Dalrymple d. 1760; 3rd Earl of Stair, etc. 4th Viscount of Stair, etc. | William Dalrymple-Crichton; 1699–1768; 5th Earl of Dumfries, etc. 4th Earl of Stair, etc. 5th Viscount of Stair, etc. 12th Lord Crichton of Sanquhar | John Dalrymple; 1720–1789; 5th Earl of Stair, etc. 6th Viscount of Stair, etc. | William Dalrymple; 1736–1807 | William Dalrymple; 1704–1771; 3rd Dalrymple Baronet of Cranstoun
Baron Cardiff, of Cardiff Castle in the County of Glamorgan, 1776; Marquess of Bute, Earl of Windsor and Viscount Mountjoy (3rd creation); 1796
John Stuart; 1744–1814; 1st Marquess of Bute, etc. 4th Earl of Bute, etc., 2nd Baron Mount Stuart of Wortley | Patrick McDouall-Crichton; 1726–1803; 6th Earl of Dumfries, etc. 13th Lord Crichton of Sanquhar | John Dalrymple; 1749–1821; 6th Earl of Stair, etc. 7th Viscount of Stair, etc. | John Dalrymple-Hamilton-Makgill; 1726–1810; 4th Dalrymple Baronet of Cranstoun
Baron Oxenfoord, of Cousland in the County of Edinburgh, 1841
John Stuart; 1767–1794 styled Viscount Mount Stuart | Elizabeth Penelope McDouall-Crichton; 1772–1797 | John William Henry Dalrymple; 1784–1840; 7th Earl of Stair, etc. 8th Viscount of Stair, etc. | John Hamilton Dalrymple; 1771–1853; 8th Earl of Stair, etc. 9th Viscount of Stair, etc. 5th Baronet Dalrymple; 1st Baron Oxenfoord | North Hamilton Dalrymple; 1776–1864; 9th Earl of Stair, etc. 10th Viscount of Stair, etc. 2nd Baron Oxenfoord; 6th Dalrymple Baronet of Cranstoun
John Crichton-Stuart; 1793–1848; 2nd Marquess of Bute, etc. 5th Earl of Bute, etc. 7th Earl of Dumfries, etc. and Baronet Stuart of Bute; 14th Lord Crichton of Sanquhar; 3rd Baron Mount Stuart of Wortley | John Hamilton Dalrymple; 1819–1903; 10th Earl of Stair, etc. 11th Viscount of Stair, etc. 3rd Baron Oxenfoord; 7th Dalrymple Baronet of Cranstoun
John Patrick Crichton-Stuart; 1847–1900; 3rd Marquess of Bute, etc. 6th Earl of Bute, etc. 8th Earl of Dumfries, etc. and Baronet Stuart of Bute; 15th Lord Crichton of Sanquhar; 4th Baron Mount Stuart of Wortley, Cumra and Inchmarnock | John Hew North Gustav Henry Hamilton-Dalrymple; 1848–1914; 11th Earl of Stair, Viscount Dalrymple, and Lord Newliston; 12th Viscount of Stair, etc. 4th Baron Oxenfoord, Glenluce and Stranraer; 8th Dalrymple Baronet of Cranstoun
John Patrick Crichton-Stuart; 1881–1947; 4th Marquess of Bute, etc. 7th Earl of Bute, etc. 9th Earl of Dumfries, etc. and Baronet Stuart of Bute; 16th Lord Crichton of Sanquhar; 5th Baron Mount Stuart of Wortley | John James Hamilton Dalrymple; 1879–1961; 12th Earl of Stair, etc. 13th Viscount of Stair, etc. 5th Baron Oxenfoord; 9th Dalrymple Baronet of Cranstoun
John Crichton-Stuart; 1907–1956; 5th Marquess of Bute, etc. 10th Earl of Dumfries, etc. and Baronet Stuart of Bute; 8th Earl of Bute, etc. 17th Lord Crichton of Sanquhar; 6th Baron Mount Stuart of Wortley | John Aymer Dalrymple; 1906–1996; 13th Earl of Stair, etc. 14th Viscount of Stair, etc. 6th Baron Oxenfoord; 10th Dalrymple Baronet of Cranstoun
John Crichton-Stuart; 1933–1993; 6th Marquess of Bute, etc. 9th Earl of Bute, etc. 11th Earl of Dumfries, etc. 11th Baronet Stuart of Bute; 18th Lord Crichton of Sanquhar; 7th Baron Mount Stuart of Wortley
John Colum Crichton-Stuart; 1958–2021; 7th Marquess of Bute, etc. 10th Earl of Bute, etc. 12th Earl of Dumfries, etc. 19th Lord Crichton of Sanquhar; 8th Baron Mount Stuart of Wortley | Anthony Crichton-Stuart b. 1961 | John David James Dalrymple b. 1961; 14th Earl of Stair, etc. 15th Viscount of Stair, etc. 7th Baron Oxenfoord; 11th Dalrymple Baronet of Cranstoun
Caroline Crichton-Stuart b. 1984 | John Bryson Crichton-Stuart b. 1989; 8th Marquess of Bute, etc. 11th Earl of Bute, etc. 13th Earl of Dumfries, etc. and Baronet Stuart of Bute; 20th Lord Crichton of Sanquhar; 9th Baron Mount Stuart of Wortley | Arthur Alec Crichton-Stuart b. 2001 | John James Thomas Dalrymple b. 2008 styled Viscount Dalrymple; Heir apparent to the Earldom of Stair

== See also ==
- Dalrymple baronets
- Earl of Dumfries
- Hamilton-Dalrymple baronets
- Admiral Sir Frederick Dalrymple-Hamilton
