= James Dalrymple =

James Dalrymple may refer to:

- James Dalrymple, 1st Viscount of Stair (1619–1695)
- Sir James Dalrymple, 1st Baronet (1650–1719), second son of the above
- James Dalrymple, 3rd Earl of Stair
- Jamie Dalrymple (born 1981), English cricketer
- Sir James Dalrymple, 2nd Baronet, Principal Auditor of the Exchequer in Scotland
- Sir James Dalrymple, 4th Baronet (died 1800), see Dalrymple baronets of Hailes (1701)
- James Dalrymple Duncan Dalrymple, Scottish landowner, antiquarian and amateur chemist
- Jim Dalrymple, co-founder of MacCentral
- James Dalrymple (athlete), or Jock Dalrymple (1892–1960), Scottish and British javelin champion
