= Dalrymple baronets of Cranstoun (1698) =

Escutcheon of the Dalrymple baronets of Cranstoun

The Dalrymple baronetcy of Cranstoun was created in the Baronetage of Nova Scotia on 28 April 1698, for James Dalrymple, second son of James Dalrymple, 1st Viscount of Stair, a clerk of the Court of Session and antiquarian. The 5th baronet, Sir John, succeeded as eighth Earl of Stair (and 9th baronet of the 1664 creation) in 1840, and the titles remain merged.

== Dalrymple baronets, of Cranstoun (1698) ==
- Sir James Dalrymple, 1st Baronet (1650–1719)
- Sir John Dalrymple, 2nd Baronet (1682–1743)
- Sir William Dalrymple, 3rd Baronet (1704–1771)
- Sir John Dalrymple Hamilton, 4th Baronet (1726–1810)
- Sir John Hamilton Dalrymple, 5th Baronet (1771–1853), succeeded as 8th Earl of Stair in 1840.

See Earl of Stair for subsequent holders.
