= Dalrymple baronets =

There have been six baronetcies created for people with the surname Dalrymple, four in the Baronetage of Nova Scotia and two in the Baronetage of the United Kingdom.

- Dalrymple baronets of Stair (1664): see Viscount of Stair
- Dalrymple baronets of Cranstoun (1698)
- Dalrymple baronets of Bargeny (1698): see Hamilton-Dalrymple baronets
- Dalrymple baronets of Hailes (1701)
- Dalrymple baronets of High Mark (1815)
- Dalrymple baronets of New Hailes (1887)
