= Principal Clerk of Session and Justiciary =

- Incumbent; Pam McFarlane since August 2020
- Member of: Scottish Courts and Tribunals Service
- Appointer: Lord President of the Court of Session
- Formation: 1532; 494 years ago
- Deputy: Deputy Principal Clerk of Session; Deputy Principal Clerk of Justiciary
- Website: Director and Principal Clerk of Session and Justiciary

The Principal Clerk of Session and Justiciary is the clerk of court responsible for the administration of the Supreme Courts of Scotland and their associated staff. The Keeper of the Signet grants a commission to the Principal Clerk of Session to allow His Majesty's Signet to be used.

Gillian Prentice was the first woman to hold the post. The Principal Clerk as of February 2024 is Yvonne Taylor.

The modern office unites the originally separate offices of Principal Clerk of Session (of the Court of Session) and Principal Clerk of Justiciary (of the High Court of Justiciary).

The Crown Agent takes directions from the Principal Clerk of Justiciary when arranging sittings of the High Court of Justiciary.

== List of office holders ==
- Sir James Dalrymple, son of the eminent legal scholar and statesman Lord Stair
- Sir John Dalrymple of Kelloch
- Sir Walter Scott, novelist (appointed 1806)
- David Hume, advocate and legal scholar (appointed 1811)
- James Fergusson, judge and legal scholar (appointed 1826)
- Thomas Thomson, advocate (1826–1852)
- Cosmo Innes (appointed 1852)
