= James Fergusson (judge) =

Scottish judge and legal writer

- Born: 1769
- Died: 1842 (aged 72–73)
- Citizenship: United Kingdom

James Fergusson (1769–1842) was a Scottish judge and legal writer.

== Biography ==
Fergusson was born in 1769. He was the eldest son of James Fergusson (1735–1816) of Bank, (afterwards of Monkwood, Ayrshire) and Margaret Hutchison (1746–1821). He studied at the University of Edinburgh, becoming a member of the Speculative Society on 9 December 1788, and was admitted member of the Faculty of Advocates 1791.

Fergusson was appointed an advocate-depute in 1809. Two years later on 4 March 1811 he appointed one of the four judges of the Consistorial Court. He held that office for a quarter of a century until, on 5 June 1826, he was appointed one of the principal clerks of session and four years later he added the post of keeper of the general record of entails for Scotland. He sold the estate of Monkwood to his brother, John H. Fergusson of Trochraigue. He died at home, 40 Heriot Row, Edinburgh, on 3 May 1842, and was buried seven days later at the new church, Greyfriars, Edinburgh.

== Bibliography ==
Fergusson wrote:

1. Letters upon the Establishment of the Volunteer Corps and Domestic Military Arrangement of Great Britain, Edinburgh, 1806.
2. Observations upon the proposed Reform in the Administration of Civil Justice in Scotland, Edinburgh, 1807 (regarding the introduction of trial by jury).
3. Reports of some recent Decisions by the Consistorial Courts of Scotland in Actions of Divorce, Edinburgh, 1817. These decisions illustrated the power of the Scottish court to dissolve marriage for adultery, which power the English court did not then possess, and the alarming collision between the respective jurisdictions of the two countries in the same island and state which had arisen therefrom.
4. Observations upon the Provisions of the Bill presented to Parliament relative to the trial in a separate tribunal of issues of fact arising in actions instituted before the Supreme Civil Court of Scotland, Edinburgh, 1824.
5. A Treatise on the present state of the Consistorial Law in Scotland, with reports of decided cases, Edinburgh, 1829.
6. Observations on Entails and Entries of Heir-Apparent, cum beneficio inventarii, with an index of the registers of tailzies from AD 1685 to 1830, Edinburgh, 1830.
7. Additional Observations on Entails, Edinburgh, 1831.

His writings detailing his interest in the differences between the possibility of divorce under Scottish law but not under English law, Reports of some recent Decisions... (1817) and A treatise on the present state ... (1830), exerted a considerable influence on the American Supreme Court judge and legal scholar Joseph Story. Story wrote, and published in 1834, the first major treatise in English written on this topic called Commentaries on the Conflict of Laws.

== Family ==
On 1 November 1806, Fergusson married Mary (d. 1845), daughter of John Home of Bassendean. They had two daughters.
