= Dalrymple baronets of Hailes (1701) =

Escutcheon of the Dalrymple baronets of Hailes

The Dalrymple baronetcy of Hailes, Midlothian was created in the Baronetage of Nova Scotia on 8 May 1701, for David Dalrymple, fifth son of James Dalrymple, 1st Viscount of Stair. He was Member of Parliament for Haddington Burghs from 1708 to 1721, in the Parliament of Great Britain. This title became extinct on the death of the 5th baronet, Sir John, on 17 October 1829.

== Dalrymple baronets, of Hailes, Midlothian (1701) ==
- Sir David Dalrymple, 1st Baronet (1665–1721)
- Sir James Dalrymple, 2nd Baronet (1692–1751), Principal Auditor of the Exchequer in Scotland
- Sir David Dalrymple, 3rd Baronet (1726–1792)
- Sir James Dalrymple, 4th Baronet (died 1800)
- Sir John Pringle Dalrymple, 5th Baronet (died 1829)
