= Sir John Dalrymple, 4th Baronet =

Scottish advocate, judge, chemist and author

Sir John Dalrymple of Cousland, 4th Baronet FRSE FSA (Scot) (1726 – 26 February 1810) was a Scottish advocate, judge, chemist and author, best known for his Memoirs of Great Britain and Ireland from the dissolution of the last parliament of Charles II until the sea battle of La Hogue, first published in 1771. A new edition of 1790 carried on to the capture of the French and Spanish navies at Vigo. The Dalrymples formed a dynasty in the Scottish legal profession. Though he was a central figure in the Scottish Enlightenment and a friend of men like David Hume and Adam Smith, Dalrymple's writings were little appreciated – he has been seen as an irritating member of the Edinburgh literati.

== Life ==
Sir John was the son of Sir William Dalrymple of Cranstoun, 3rd Baronet (1704–1771) and a cousin of William Dalrymple-Crichton, 4th Earl of Stair. His mother was Agnes Crawford (died 1755). He was educated at Edinburgh and Cambridge universities, Dalrymple was admitted to the Faculty of Advocates in 1748. He served as Solicitor to the Board of Excise, and as a Baron of the Exchequer (1776–1807).

On Thomas Hamilton's death in 1779, Sir John inherited Oxenfoord and began laying out the gardens. He published in 1774 his Essays on Different Natural Situations of Gardens, which became an influential book at the time.

In 1783 Dalrymple was a co-founder of the Royal Society of Edinburgh. In later life his Edinburgh house was at 15 Buccleuch Place, just south of George Square.

Sir John Dalrymple died on 26 February 1810.

== Family ==
In 1760 Dalrymple married his cousin, Elizabeth Hamilton MacGill, daughter and heiress of Thomas Hamilton of Fala, who himself had inherited Oxenfoord Castle, property of the Viscounts of Oxfuird. This led him to adopt her name on her inheritance. They had 13 children, but only five outlived him.

== Memoirs of Great Britain and Ireland ==
David Hume, when writing his History of England, requested Dalrymple to search the French state archives. Dalrymple discovered that the Secret Treaty of Dover did indeed contain a provision that Charles II convert to Roman Catholicism and that there was a secret agreement between Charles and Louis XIV made in March 1681. He also uncovered "King William's Chest" at Kensington Palace, containing the original Invitation to William from the Immortal Seven. When Dalrymple, "a devoted Whig", saw he had found the original, he was filled with emotion: "Immortal Seven! whose memories Britain can never sufficiently revere". He published this in the first volume of his Memoirs in 1771. However, when he returned to the French archives for the second volume (published in 1773), he found in the French Ambassador's despatches evidence that the legendary Whig martyr Algernon Sidney had accepted money from Louis XIV in 1678 and that William Russell, Lord Russell had negotiated with him. Dalrymple wrote: "When I found Lord Russell intriguing with the Court of Versailles, and Algernon Sidney taking money from it, I felt very near the same shock as if I had seen a son turn his back in the day of battle."

When the first volume of Dalrymple's Memoirs appeared in 1771, Hume criticised it: "There is not a new circumstance of the least importance from the beginning to the end of the work." He said of the controversy over the revelations on Russell and Sidney:

It is amusing to observe the general, and I may say national rage, excited by the late discovery of this secret negotiation [with the French Court]; chiefly on account of Algernon Sidney, whom the blind prejudices of party had exalted into a hero. His ingratitude and breach of faith in applying for the King's pardon, and immediately on his return entering into cabals for rebellion, form a conduct much more criminal than the taking of French gold. Yet the former circumstance was always known, and always disregarded. But everything connected with France is supposed in England to be polluted beyond all possibility of expiation. Even Lord Russell, whose conduct in this negotiation was only factious, and that in an ordinary degree, is imagined to be dishonoured by the same discovery.

In a discussion with James Boswell, Samuel Johnson said of the discoveries on Russell and Sidney:

JOHNSON. "Why, Sir, every body who had just notions of government thought them rascals before. It is well that all mankind now see them to be rascals." BOSWELL. "But, Sir, may not those discoveries be true without their being rascals?" JOHNSON. "Consider, Sir; would any of them have been willing to have had it known that they intrigued with France? Depend upon it, Sir, he who does what he is afraid should be known, has something rotten about him. This Dalrymple seems to be an honest fellow; for he tells equally what makes against both sides. But nothing can be poorer than his mode of writing: it is the mere bouncing of a school-boy. Great He! but greater She! and such stuff."

Maurice Ashley ascribed to the publication of the Memoirs "a striking change in the historiography of the revolution", as he had access to important papers. J. P. Kenyon termed the "careful and accurate transcripts [Dalrymple] published... [of] key documents... a boon to other historians right down to the present day."

== Other publications ==
- Essay Towards a General History of Feudal Property in Great Britain (1757)
- Consideration Upon the Policy of Entails in Great Britain (1764)

== Notes ==
Baronetage of Nova Scotia
Preceded by William Dalrymple	Baronet (of Killock); 1771–1810	Succeeded by John Hamilton Dalrymple
