= Castle Kennedy (castle) =

17th-century tower house in Scotland

Coordinates: 54.9073°N 4.9489°W

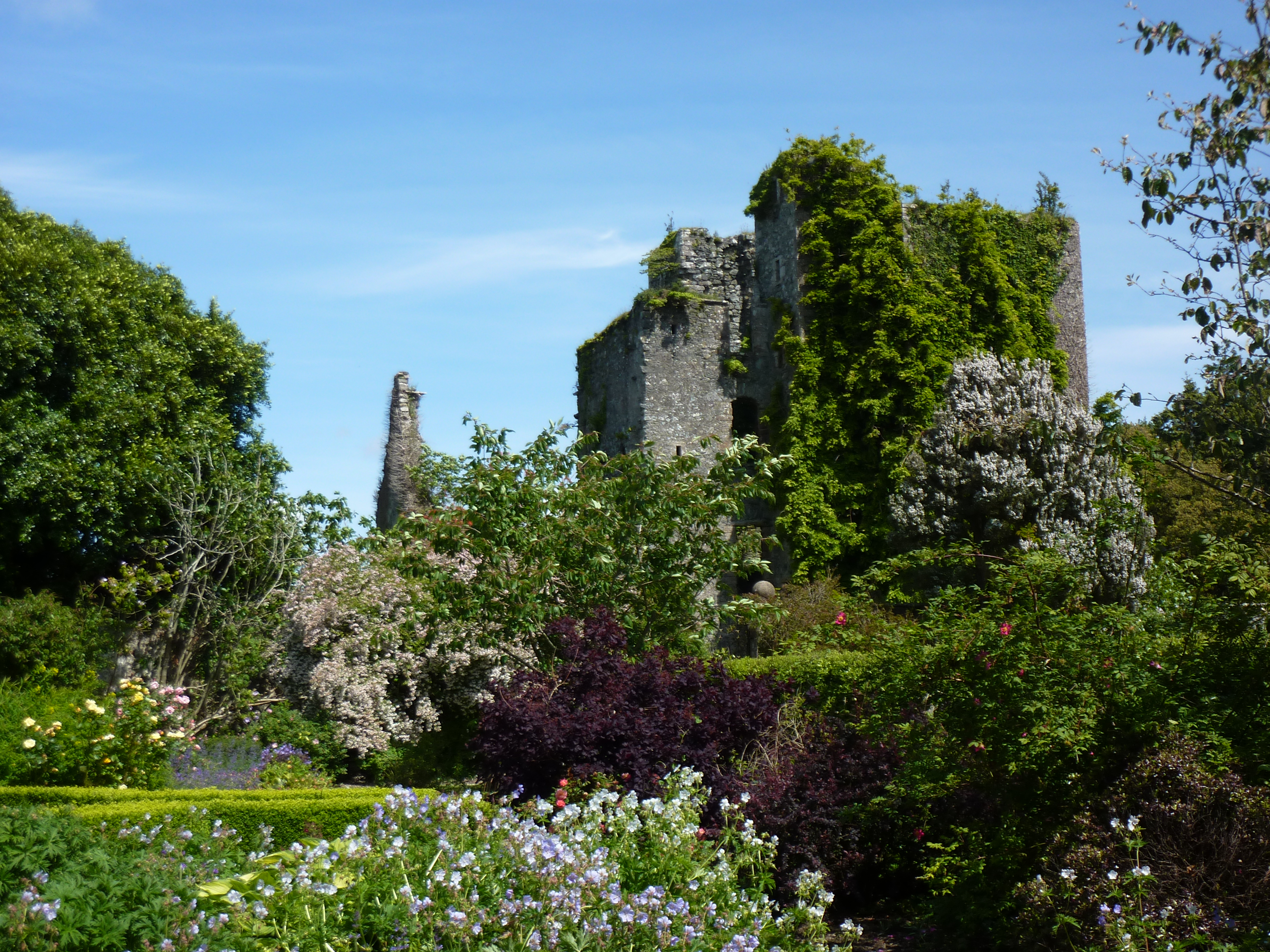
Castle Kennedy's ruins seen from the Walled Garden

Castle Kennedy is a ruined 17th-century tower house, about 3 miles (4.8 km) east of Stranraer, Dumfries and Galloway, Scotland, around 0.5 miles (0.8 km) north of the village of Castle Kennedy.

== History ==
The property belonged to the Kennedys from 1482; the castle was started in 1607, on the site of an earlier stronghold, by John Kennedy, 5th Earl of Cassilis. After a brief period in the hands of the Hamiltons of Bargany the property passed to the Dalrymples of Stair around 1677. The castle was gutted by fire in 1716, and it was never restored. Lochinch Castle is about 0.5 miles (0.8 km) north.

== Structure ==
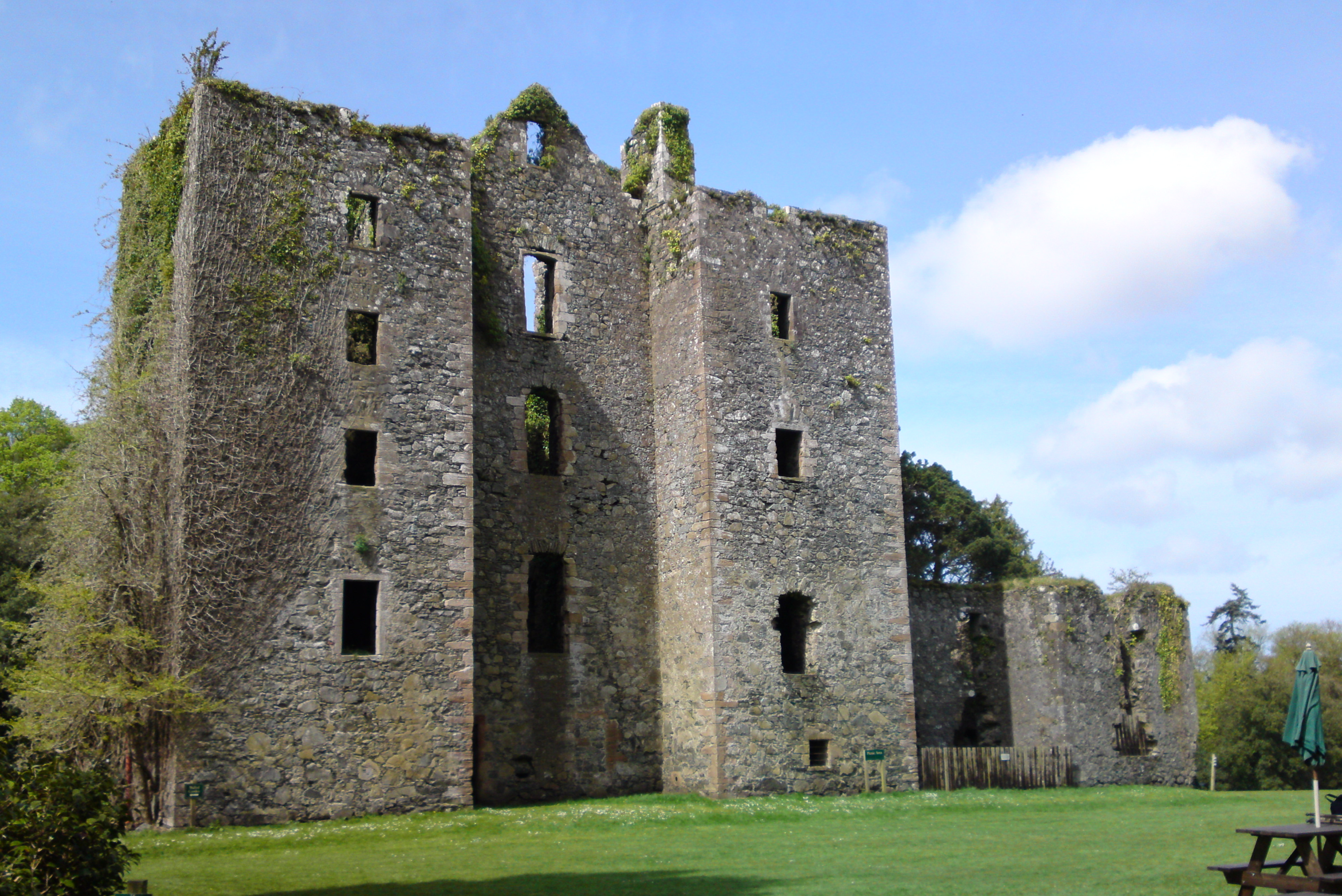
The Castle Kennedy

This E-plan castle was originally on an island in a loch. The main block has four storeys and an attic; there are two five-storey projecting square wings; and two seven-storey square towers in the re-entrant angles. One of the seven-storey towers contains the main turnpike stair. Three-storey wings are a later addition.

There are large windows, evenly spaced, and shot-holes. From the main entrance a vaulted passage runs through the basement; it communicated with a newel-stair in the south west re-entrant turret. All of the basement rooms, including the large kitchen, are vaulted.

It is thought that the public rooms were situated within the main block, which had a single large chamber at each level. There were a series of bedchambers and associated closets in the wings. There is no evidence of any enclosure; there is a walled garden to the south which dates from the 18th century.

== See also ==
- List of castles in Scotland
- Castles in Great Britain and Ireland

== Gallery ==
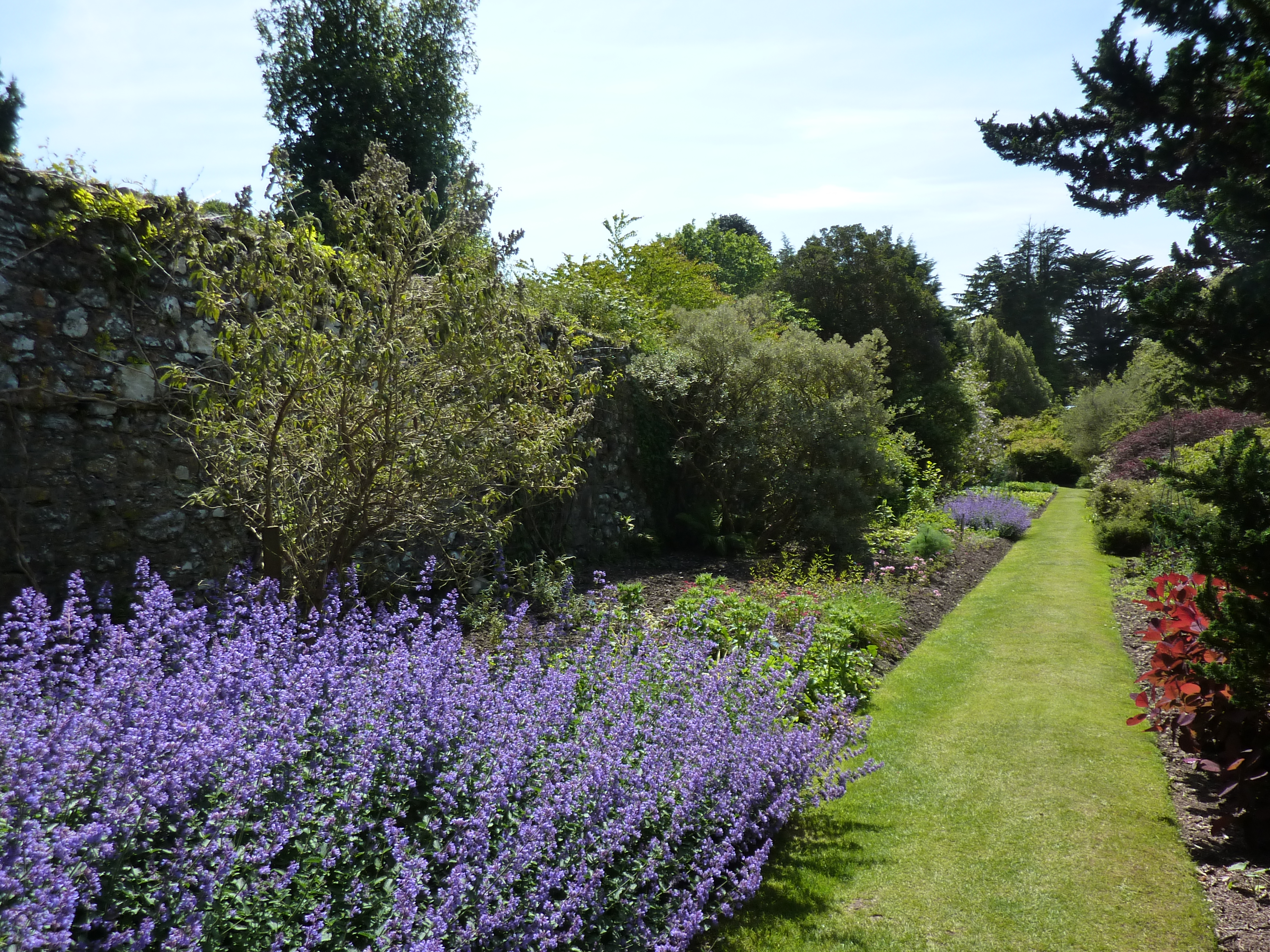
Flower bed in the Walled Garden

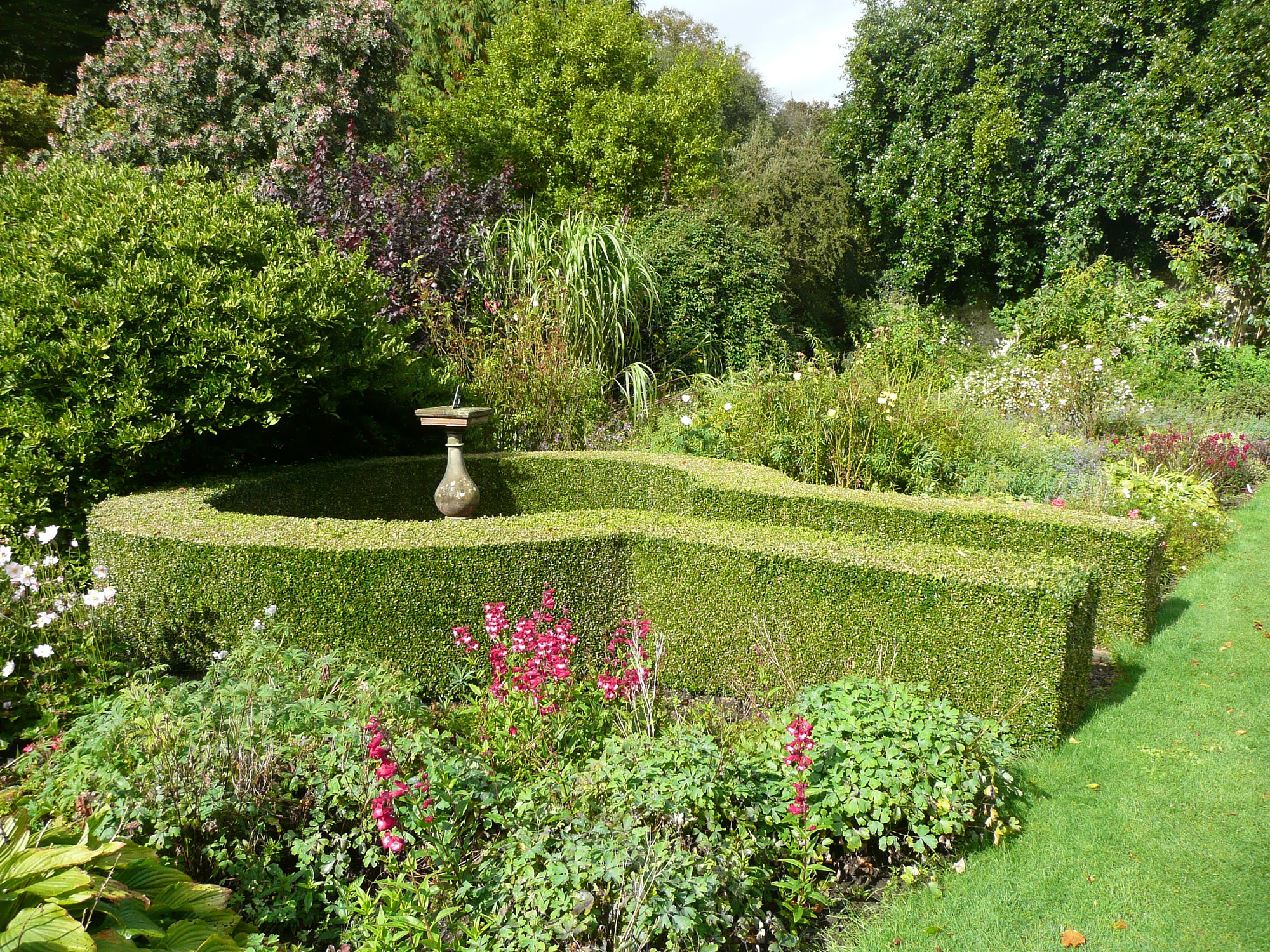
Box hedge and sundial in the Walled Garden

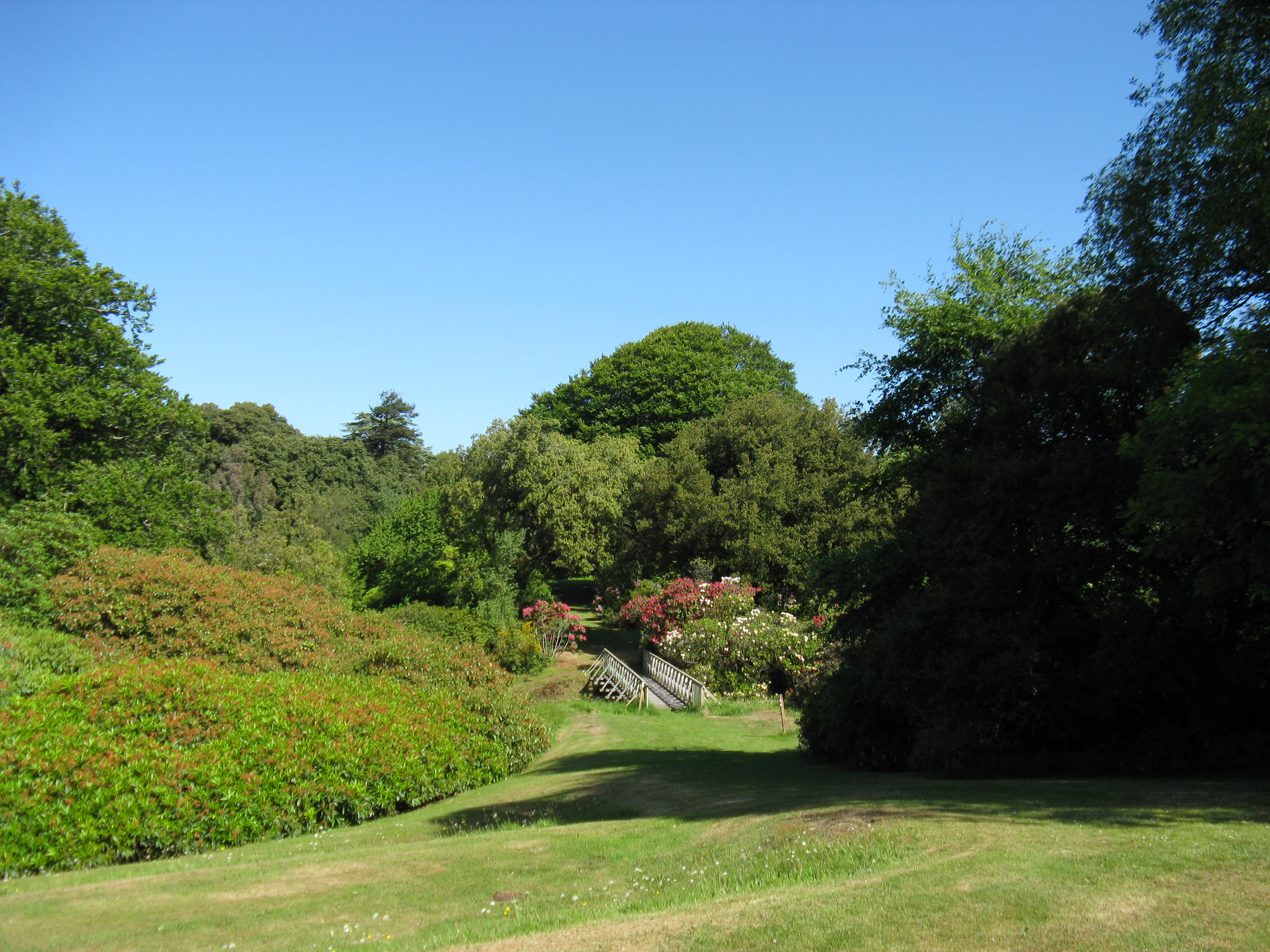
Footbridge

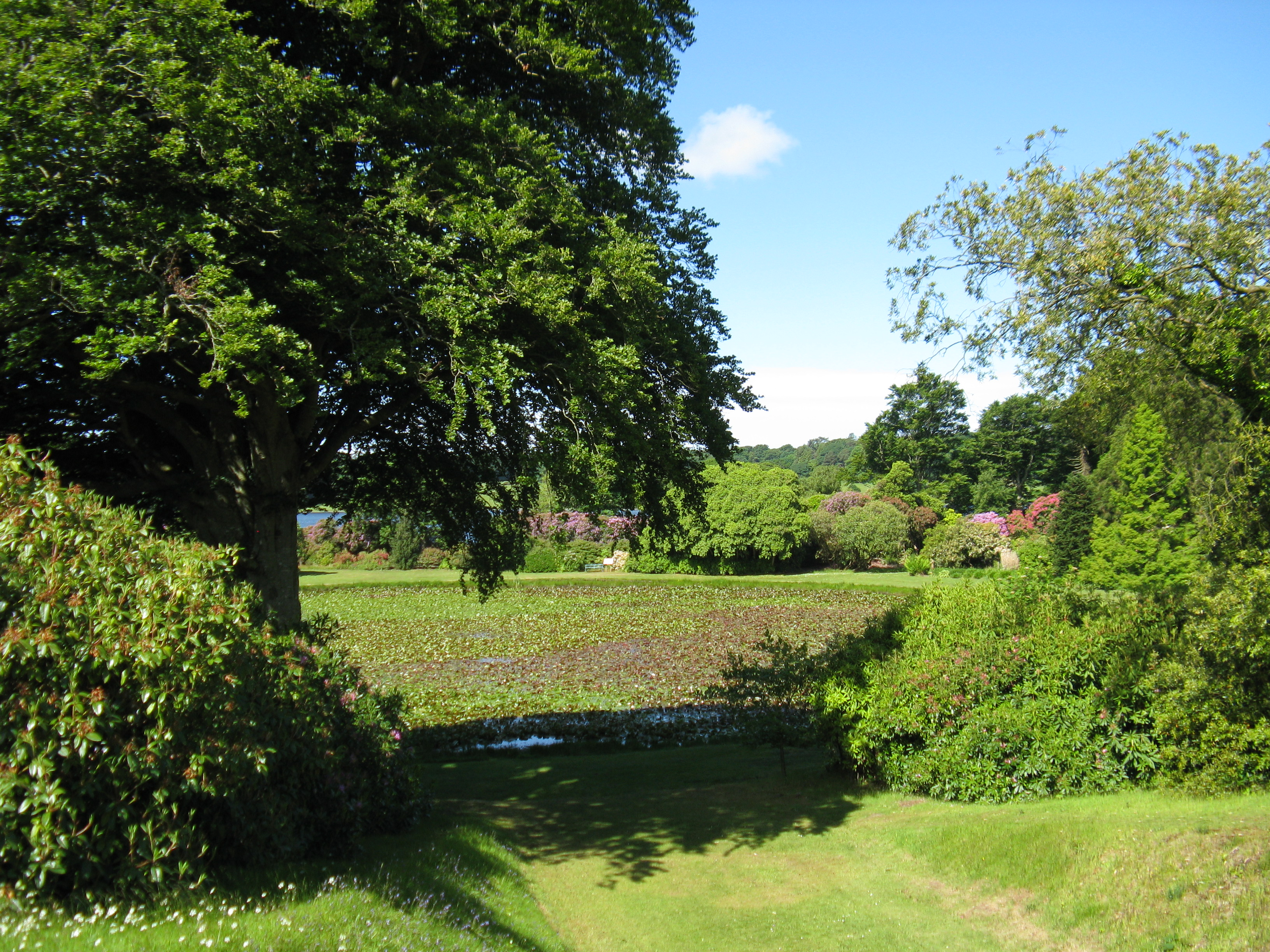
Castle Kennedy Gardens

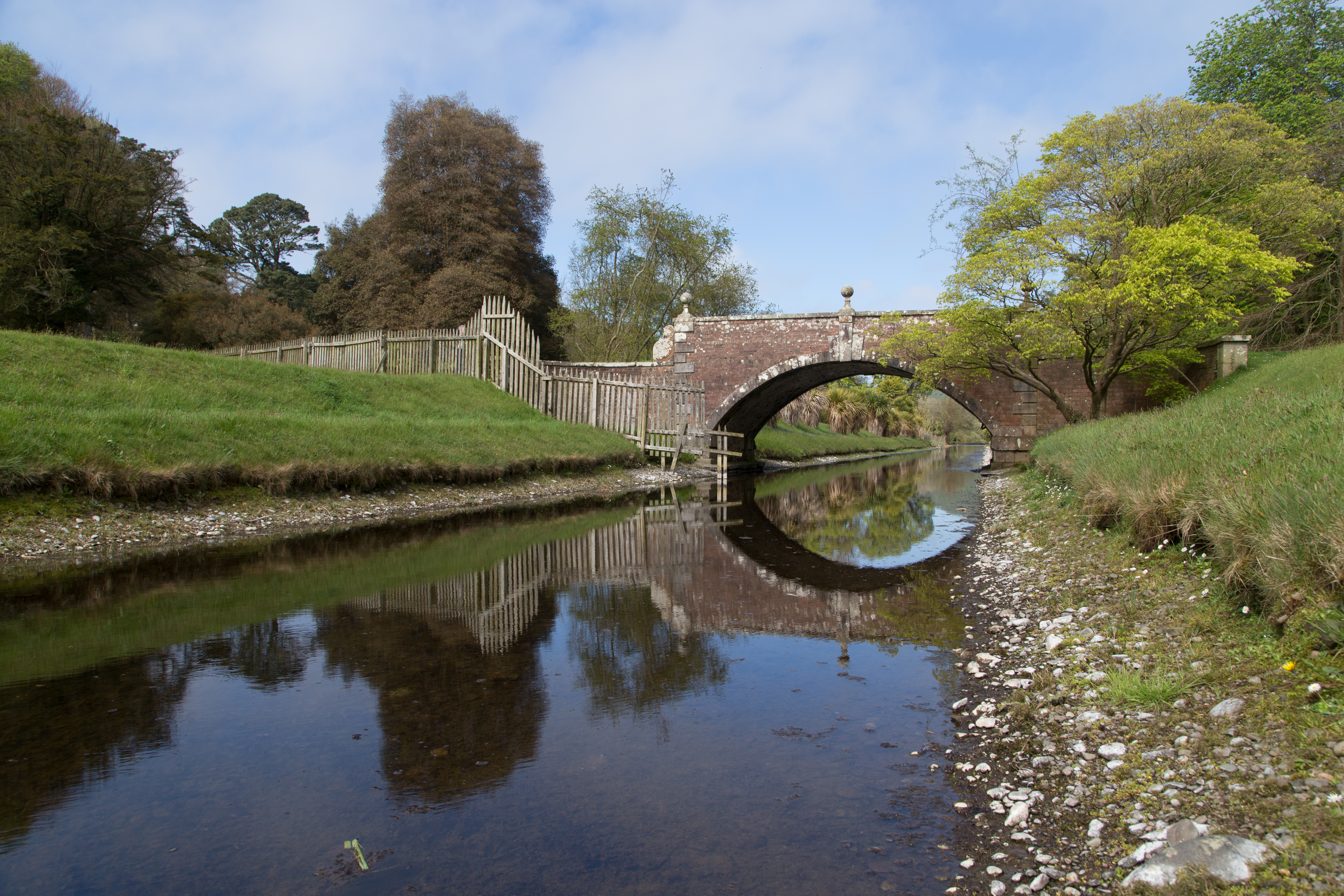
Canal
