= Patrick McDouall-Crichton, 6th Earl of Dumfries =

Scottish peer

The Right Honourable The Earl of Dumfries
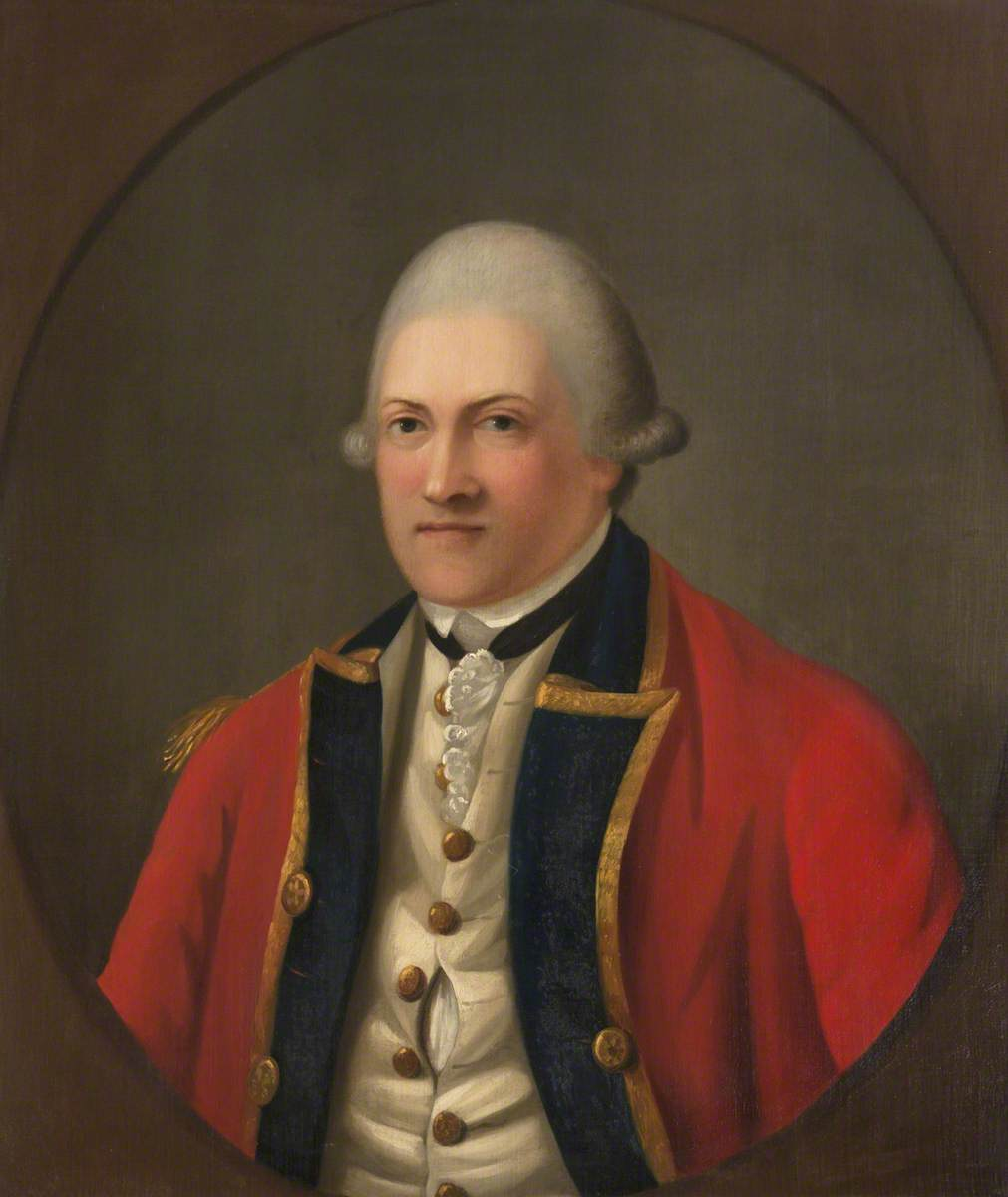
- Patrick McDouall-Crichton (1726–1803), 6th Earl of Dumfries
- Predecessor: William Dalrymple-Crichton, 5th Earl of Dumfries, 4th Earl of Stair
- Successor: John Crichton-Stuart, 2nd Marquess of Bute
- Born: 15 October 1726
- Died: 7 April 1803 (aged 76)
- Spouse: Margaret Crauford
- Issue: Elizabeth Penelope Crichton
- Father: John McDouall
- Mother: Elizabeth Crichton Dalrymple

Patrick McDouall-Crichton, 6th Earl of Dumfries (15 October 1726 – 7 April 1803) was a Scottish peer. He was the son of John McDouall of Freugh and Elizabeth Dalrymple-Crichton.

In 1768 he inherited the Earldom of Dumfries from his maternal uncle William Dalrymple-Crichton, and on his death was succeeded by his grandson, John, Lord Mount Stuart, grandson of the 1st Marquess of Bute and later 2nd Marquess of Bute.

The Earl lived in London as well as his estate, Dumfries House in Ayrshire which lay directly adjacent to the lands of Auchinleck House the Boswell home. The Earl is mentioned a few more times in James Boswell's journals, and they appear to have been quite civil to each other, Boswell even visiting the Earl a few times in London in 1787 and 1788.

== Family ==
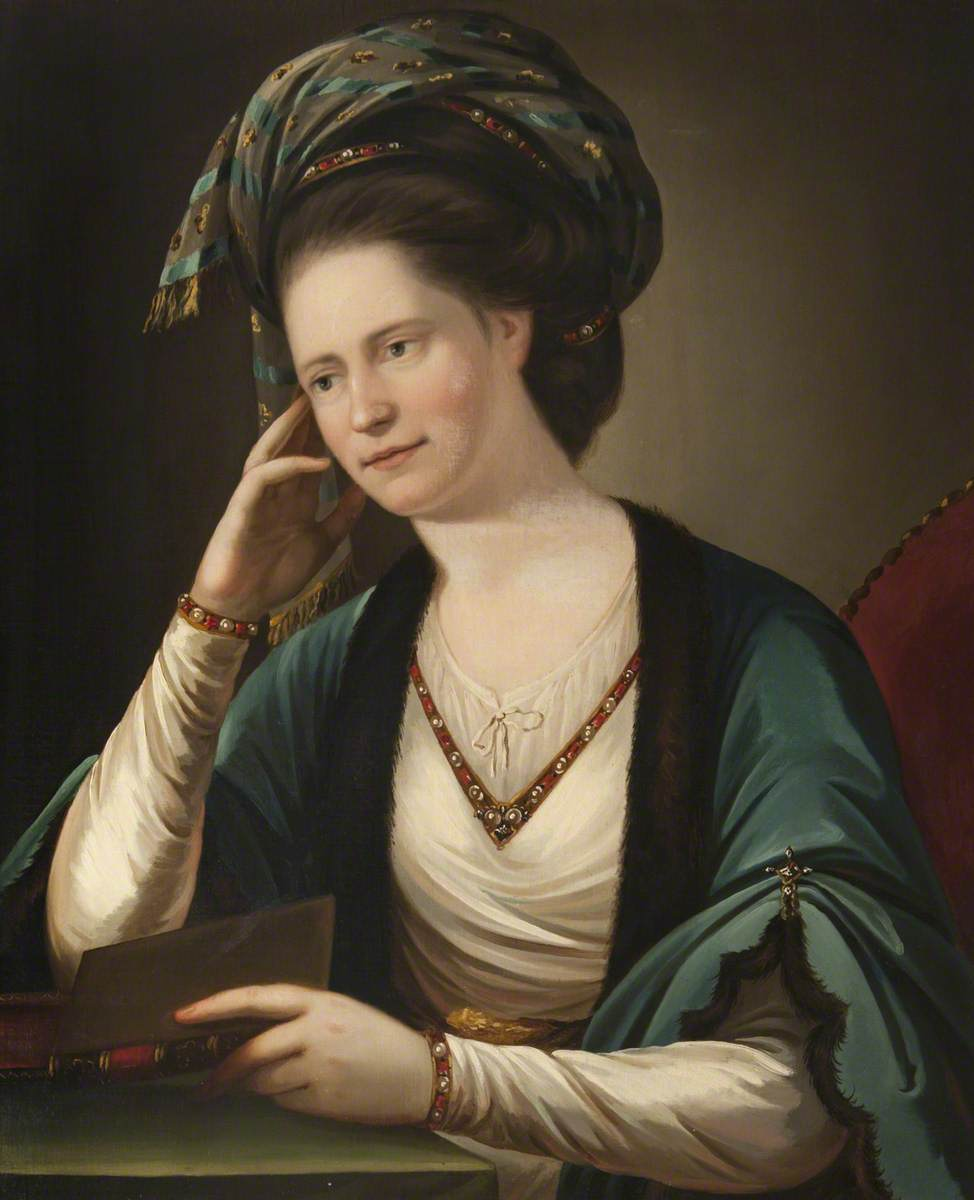
Countess Margaret, Wife of the 6th Earl of Dumfries

He married Margaret ("Peggy") Crauford, daughter of Ronald Crauford of Restalrig on 12 September 1771 and there was much rejoicing in Restalrig village.

They had one child:

- Lady Elizabeth Penelope McDouall-Crichton, later Elizabeth, Lady Mount Stuart (25 November 1772 – 25 July 1797)

Masonic offices
Preceded by James Adolphus Oughton	Grand Master of the Grand Lodge of Scotland; 1771–1773	Succeeded by The Duke of Atholl
Peerage of Scotland
Preceded by William Dalrymple-Crichton	Earl of Dumfries; 1769–1803	Succeeded by John Stuart
