= James Dalrymple, 1st Viscount of Stair =

Scottish lawyer and statesman (1619–1695)

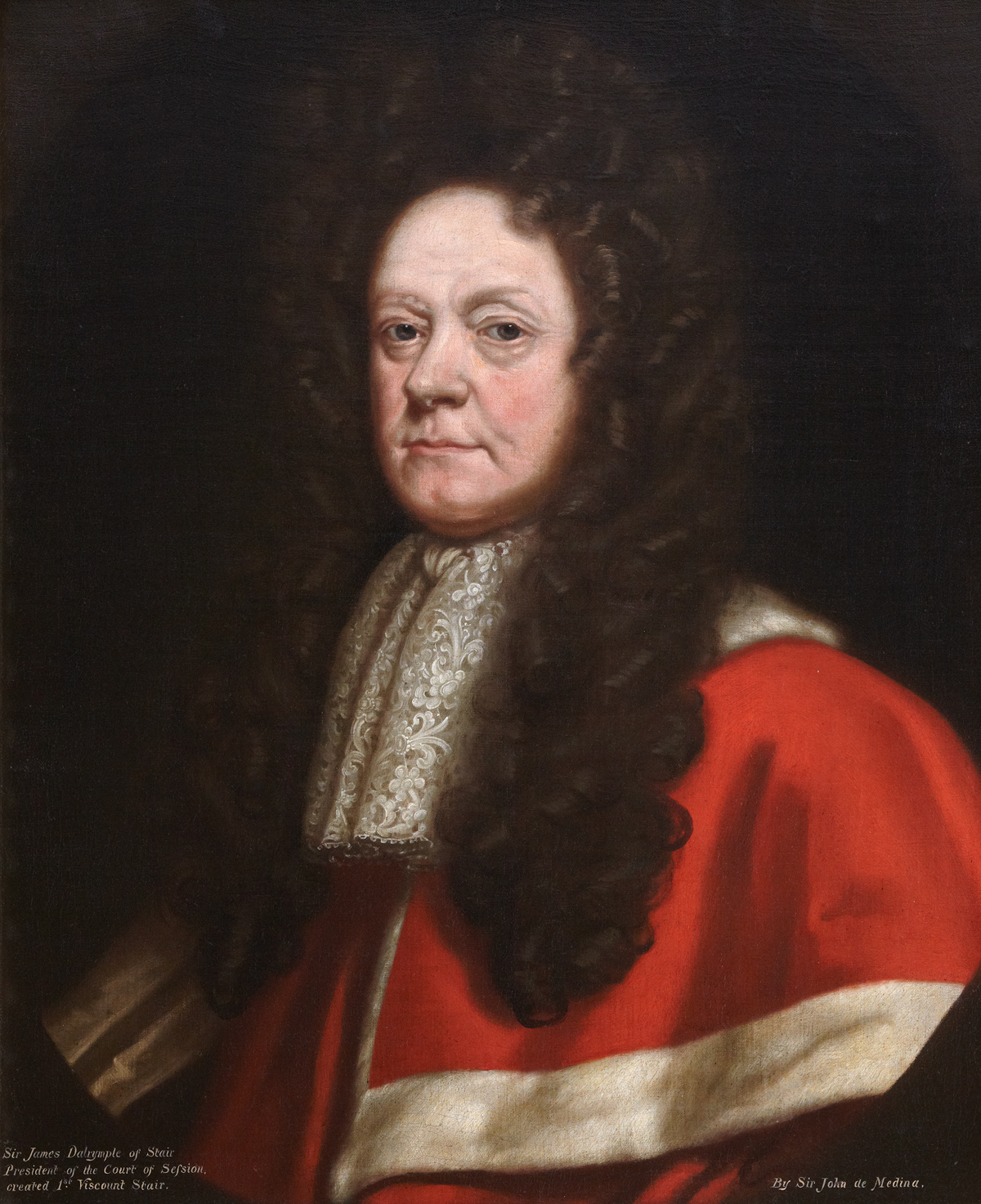
Sir James Dalrymple of Stair, President of the Court of Session, Created 1st Viscount Stair

James Dalrymple, 1st Viscount Stair (May 1619 – 29 November 1695) was a Scottish lawyer and statesman, and a key influence on the Scottish Enlightenment. He was a leading figure of Scottish law, "and also one of the greatest thinkers on law across Europe has ever produced".

According to Alexander Broadie, Professor of Logic and Rhetoric at Glasgow University, in his book The Scottish Enlightenment, the first Scottish enlightenment began Post Reformation in the 15th century, with figures such as John Mair (1467–1550), James Dalrymple (1619–1695), Duns Scotus (1265–1308), George Buchanan (1506–1582) and many others. These scholars were predominately educated at Paris university and then returned to teach at Scotland's ancient universities—St Andrews, Aberdeen, and Glasgow. "Dalrymple graduated from Glasgow university in 1647 and was regent in arts there from 1641 until 1647. The following year he became an advocate and thereafter was appointed a judge. From 1661 Dalrymple, by now Viscount Stair, was active in the Court of Session and sat on many commissions through which he was connected to important moments in Scottish history."

Broadie writes, "Above all, however, the reason Stair is important to Scotland is his treatise, The institutions of the law of Scotland, deduced from its originals, and collated with the civil, canon and feudal laws; and with the customs of neighbouring nations ... . 1st edition Edinburgh, 1681. This book set the practice of law in Scotland on a sound philosophical basis, almost certainly helped to ensure that Scots law would remain in force as a distinct entity after the union of 1707".

The University of Glasgow's Law School is housed in The Stair Building, built in 1870 by Sir Gilbert Scott, named after Stair. He also gave his name to The Stair Memorial Encyclopedia, described as, "the cornerstone of the Scots lawyer's library."

== Biography ==
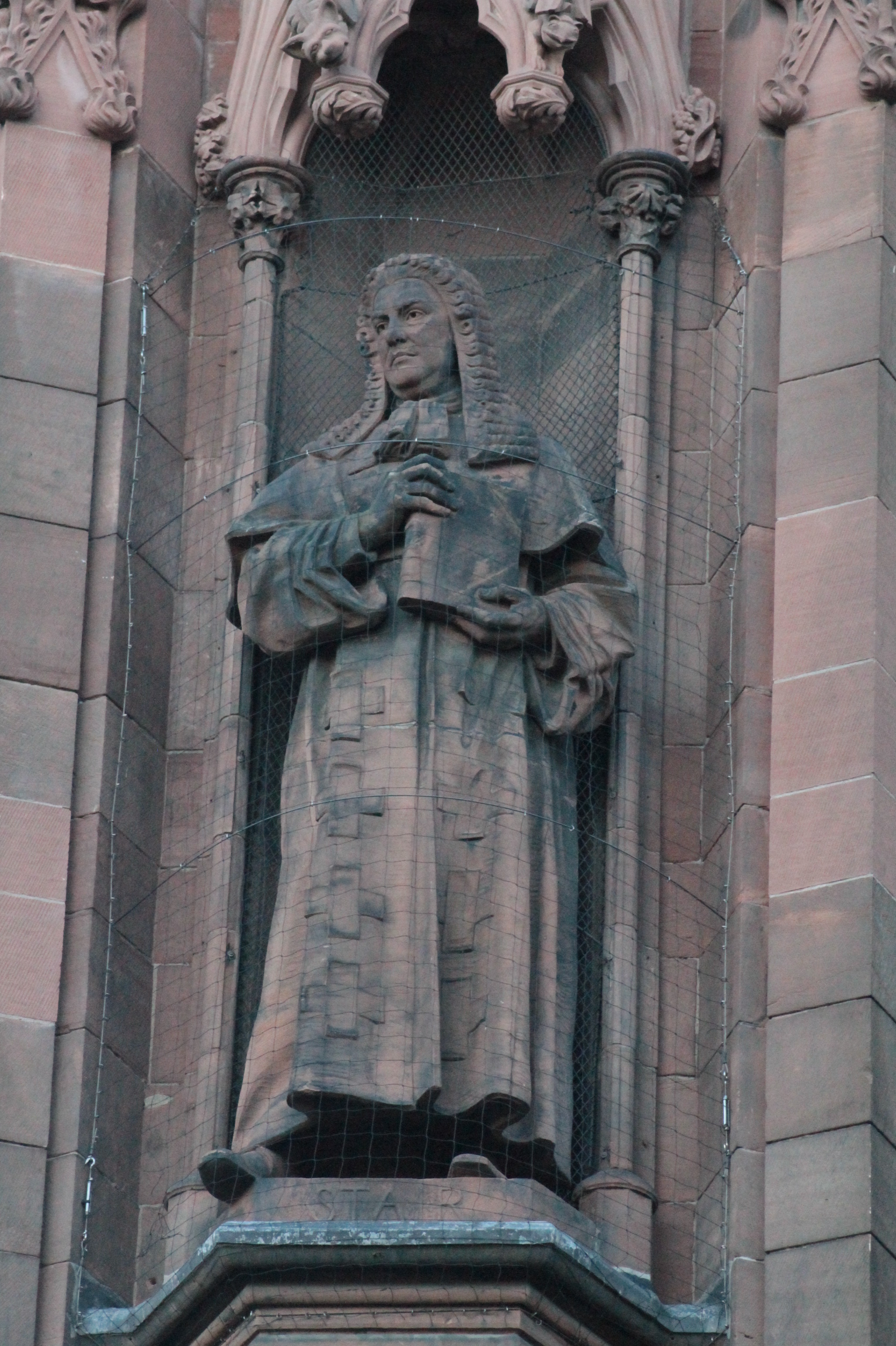
Statue of James Dalrymple, Viscount Stair, Scottish National Portrait Gallery

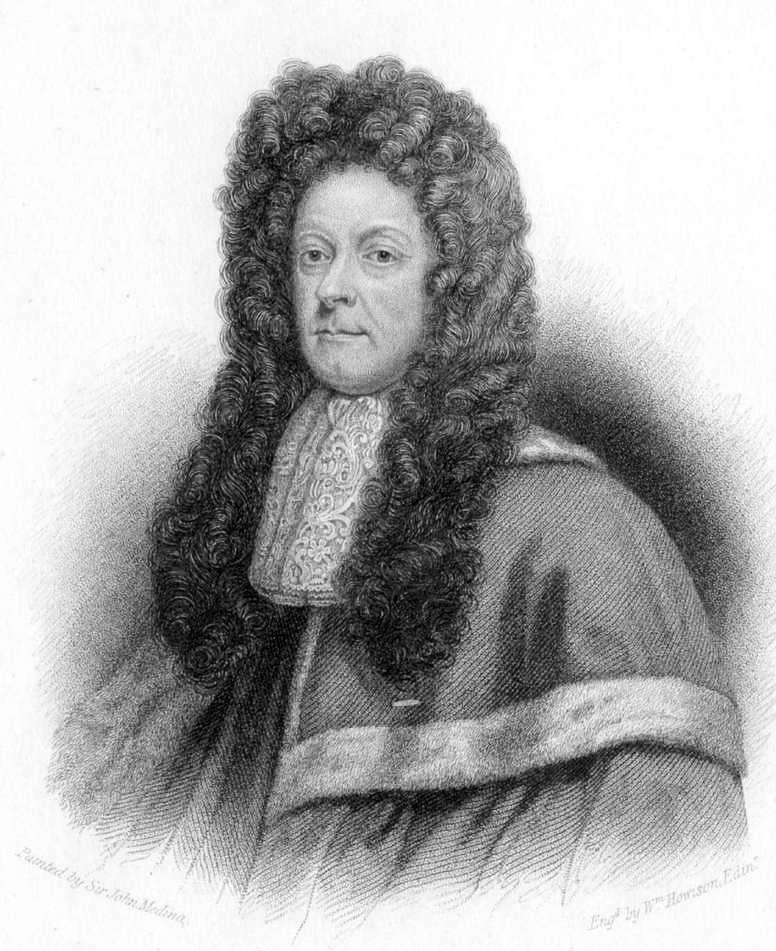
James Dalrymple

James Dalrymple was born at Drummurchie, Barr, Ayrshire. He was descended from several generations of a family inclined to the principles of the Reformation. He had ancestors among the Lollards of Kyleboth both on his father's and his mother's side. His father, James Dalrymple, laird of the small estate of Stair in the District of Kyle, Ayrshire, died when he was an infant. His mother, Janet Kennedy of Knockdaw, is described as "a woman of excellent spirit", who took care to have him well educated. From the grammar school at Mauchline he went, in 1633, to the University of Glasgow, where he graduated in arts on 26 July 1637. Next year he went to Edinburgh, probably with the intention of studying law, but the troubles of the times, then approaching a crisis, led him to change his course, and we next find him serving in the Earl of Glencairn's regiment in the War of the Covenant.

What part he took in it is not certainly known, but he was in command of a troop when recalled in 1641 to compete for a regency (as a tutorship or professorship was then called) in the University of Glasgow. He was elected in March. Mathematics, logic, ethics and politics were the chief subjects of his lectures, and a notebook on logic by one of his students has been preserved. His activity and skill in matters of college business were praised by his colleagues, who numbered amongst them some of the leading Covenanting divines, and his zeal in teaching was gratefully acknowledged by his students. After nearly seven years' service he resigned his regency, and removed to Edinburgh, where he was admitted to the bar on 17 February 1648.

This step had probably been rendered easier by his marriage, four years before, to Margaret Ross, co-heiress of Balneil in Wigtown. Stair's practice at the bar does not appear to have been large. His talents lay rather in the direction of learning and business than of oratory or advocacy. His reputation and the confidence reposed in him were shown by his appointment in 1649 as secretary to the commission sent to the Hague to treat with Charles II by the Scots Parliament. The negotiation having been broken off through the unwillingness of the young king to accept the terms of the Covenanters, Stair was again sent in the following year to Breda, where the failure of Montrose's expedition forced Charles to change his attitude and to return to Scotland as the covenanted king. Stair had preceded him, and met him on his landing in Aberdeenshire, probably carrying with him the news of the execution of Montrose, which he had witnessed.

During the Commonwealth of England, Stair continued to practise at the bar, but like most of his brethren he refused in 1654 to take the oath of allegiance to the Commonwealth. Three years later, on the death of James Learmonth, Lord Balcomie, Stair was appointed one of the Commissioners for the Administration of Justice in Scotland, on the recommendation of Monk. His appointment to the bench on 1 July 1657, by Monk, was confirmed by Oliver Cromwell on the 26th. Stair's association with the English judges at this time must have enlarged his acquaintance with English law, as his travels had extended his knowledge of the civil law and the modern European systems which followed it. He thus acquired a singular advantage when he came to write on law, regarding it from a cosmopolitan, or international, rather than a merely local or national point of view.

His actual discharge of judicial duty at this time was short, for after the death of Cromwell the courts in Scotland were shut—a new commission issued in 1660 not having taken effect, it being uncertain in whose name the commission ought to run. It was during this period that Stair became intimate with Monk, who is said to have been advised by him when he left Scotland to call a full and free parliament. Soon after the Restoration Stair went to London, where he was received with favour by Charles, knighted, and included in the new nomination of judges in the Court of Session on 13 February 1661.

He was also put on various important commissions, busied himself with local and agricultural affairs, and, like most of the Scottish judges of this and the following century, acted with zest and credit the part of a good country gentleman. In 1662 he was one of the judges who refused to take the declaration that the National Covenant and the Solemn League and Covenant were unlawful oaths, and, forestalling the deposition which had been threatened as the penalty of continued non-compliance, he placed his resignation in the king's hands. The king, however, summoned him to London, and allowed him to take the declaration under an implied reservation.

The next five years of Stair's life were comparatively uneventful, but in 1669 a family calamity, the exact facts of which will probably never be ascertained, overtook him. His daughter Janet, who had been betrothed to Lord Rutherfurd, was married to Dunbar of Baldoon, and some tragic incident occurred on the wedding night, from the effects of which she never recovered. As the traditions vary on the central fact, whether it was the bride who stabbed her husband, or the husband who stabbed the bride, no credence can be given to the mass of superstitions and spiteful slander which surrounded it, principally levelled at Lady Stair. Sir Walter Scott took the plot of his Bride of Lammermoor from this incident, but he disclaimed any intention of making Lord Stair the basis for Sir William Ashton.

In 1670 Stair served as one of the Scottish commissioners who went to London to treat of the Union, but the project, not seriously pressed by Charles and his ministers, broke down through a claim on the part of the Scots to what was deemed an excessive representation in the British parliament. In January 1671 Stair was appointed Lord President of the Court of Session. In the following year, and again in 1673, he was returned to parliament for Wigtownshire, and took part in the important legislation of those years in the department of private law. During the bad time of Lauderdale's government Stair used his influence in the Privy Council and with Lauderdale to mitigate the severity of the orders passed against ecclesiastical offenders, but for the most part he abstained from attending a board whose policy he could not approve.

In 1679 he went to London to defend the court against charges of partiality and injustice which had been made against it, and was thanked by his brethren for his success. When, in the following year, the Duke of York came to Scotland Stair distinguished himself by a bold speech, in which he congratulated the duke on his coming amongst a nation which was entirely Protestant. This speech can have been little relished, and the duke was henceforth his implacable enemy. His influence prevented Stair from being made Chancellor in 1681, on the death of the Duke of Rothes.

The parliament of this year, in which Stair again sat, was memorable for two statutes, one in private law and the other in public law. The former, relating to the testing of deeds, was drawn by Stair, and is sometimes called by his name. The other was the infamous Test Act, probably the worst of the many measures devised at this period with the object of fettering the conscience by oaths. Stair also had a minor share in the form which this law finally took, but it was confined to the insertion of a definition of "the Protestant religion", by which he hoped to make the test harmless, but his expectation was disappointed. Yet, self-contradictory and absurd as it was, the Test Act was at once rigidly enforced. Argyll, who declared he took it only insofar as it was consistent with itself and the Protestant religion, was tried and condemned for treason and narrowly saved his life by escaping from Edinburgh Castle the day before that fixed for his execution. Stair, dreading a similar fate, went to London to seek a personal interview with the king, who had more than once befriended him, perhaps remembering his services in the Netherlands, but the Duke of York intercepted his access to the royal ear, and when he returned to Scotland he found a new commission of judges issued, from which his name was omitted.

He retired to his wife's estate in Galloway, and occupied himself with preparing for the press his great work, The Institutions of the Law of Scotland, which he published in the autumn of 1681, with a dedication to the king. He was not, however, allowed to pursue his legal studies in peaceful retirement. His wife was charged with attending conventicles, his factor and tenants severely fined, and he was himself not safe from prosecution at any moment. A fierce dispute arose between Claverhouse and Stair's son, John, Master of Stair, relative to the regality of Glenluce, and, both having appealed to the Privy Council, Claverhouse, as might have been expected, was cleared of all the charges brought against him and the Master was deprived of the regality. Stair had still powerful friends, but his opponents were more powerful, and he received advice to quit the country.

He repaired to Holland in October 1684, and took up his residence, along with his wife and some of his younger children, at Leiden. While there he published the Decisions of the Court of Session between 1666 and 1671, of which he had kept a daily record, and a small treatise on natural philosophy, entitled Physiologia nova experimentalis. In his absence a prosecution for treason was raised^{1} against him and others of the exiles by Sir George Mackenzie, the Lord Advocate. He was charged with accession to the rebellion of 1679, the Rye House Plot, and the expedition of Argyll. With the first two he had no connexion. With Argyll's unfortunate attempt he had no doubt sympathized, but the only proof of his complicity was slight, and was obtained by torture.

The proceedings against him were never brought to an issue, having been continued by successive adjournments until 1687, when they were dropped. The cause of their abandonment was the appointment of his son, the Master of Stair, who had made his peace with James II, as Lord Advocate in place of Mackenzie, who was dismissed from office for refusing to relax the penal laws against the Roman Catholics. The Master only held office as Lord Advocate for a year, when he was "degraded to be Justice Clerk" the king and his advisers finding him not a fit tool for their purpose. Stair remained in Holland until the following year, when he returned under (from the Protestant viewpoint) happier auspices in the suite of William of Orange. William, who had made his acquaintance through Fagel, Grand Pensionary of the States of Holland, was ever afterwards the firm friend of Stair and his family.

The Master was made Lord Advocate, and, on the murder of Lockhart of Carnwath in the following year, Stair was again placed at the head of the Court of Session. An unscrupulous opposition, headed by Montgomery of Skelmorlie who coveted the office of Secretary for Scotland, and Lord Ross, who aimed at the presidency of the court, sprang up in the Scottish parliament, and an anonymous pamphleteer, perhaps Montgomery himself or Ferguson the Plotter, attacked Stair in a pamphlet entitled The Late Proceedings of the Parliament of Scotland Stated and Vindicated. He defended himself by publishing an Apology, which, in the opinion of impartial judges, was a complete vindication. Shortly after its issue he was created Viscount Stair (1690). He had now reached the summit of his prosperity, and the few years which remained of his old age were saddened by private and public cares. In 1692 he lost his wife, the faithful partner of his good and evil fortune for nearly fifty years.

The massacre of the Macdonalds of Glencoe (13 February 1692), which has marked his son, the Master of Stair, with a stain which his great services to the state cannot efface—for he was undoubtedly the principal adviser of William in that treacherous and cruel deed, as a signal way of repressing rebellion in the Highlands—was used as an opportunity by his adversaries of renewing their attack on the old president. His own share in the crime was remote. It was alleged that he had as a privy councillor declined to receive Glencoe's oath of allegiance, though tendered, on the technical ground that it was given after the day fixed, but even this was not clearly proved. But some share of the odium which attached to his son was naturally reflected on him. Other grounds of complaint were not difficult to make up, which found willing supporters in the opposition members of parliament.

A disappointed suitor brought in a bill in 1693 complaining of his partiality. He was also accused of domineering over the other judges and of favouring the clients of his sons. Two bills were introduced without naming him but really aimed at him—one to disqualify peers from being judges and the other to confer on the Crown a power to appoint temporary presidents of the court. The complaint against him was remitted to a committee, which, after full inquiry, completely exculpated him, and the two bills, whose incompetency he demonstrated in an able paper addressed to the commission and parliament, were allowed to drop. He was also one of a parliamentary commission which prepared a report on the regulation of the judicatures, afterwards made the basis of a statute in 1695 supplementary to that of 1672, and forming the foundation of the judicial procedure in the Scottish courts for many years.

On 29 November 1695 Stair, who had been for some time in failing health, died at his house in Edinburgh, aged 76, and was buried in the church of St Giles. His Edinburgh house, the former palace of Mary of Guise on the Castlehill was purchased by John Wightman of Mauldslie, a future Lord Provost of Edinburgh. It was redeveloped in 1843 to build New College.

In 1695 there was published in London a small volume with the title A Vindication of the Divine Perfections, Illustrating the Glory of God in them by Reason and Revelation, methodically digested By a Person of Honour. It was edited by the two Nonconformist divines, William Bates and John Howe, who had been in exile in the Netherlands along with Stair, and is undoubtedly his work. Perhaps it had been a sketch of the " Inquiry Concerning Natural Theology " which he had contemplated writing in 1681. It is of no value as a theological work, for Stair was no more a theologian than he was a man of science, but it is of interest as showing the serious bent of his thoughts and the genuine piety of his character.

== Works ==
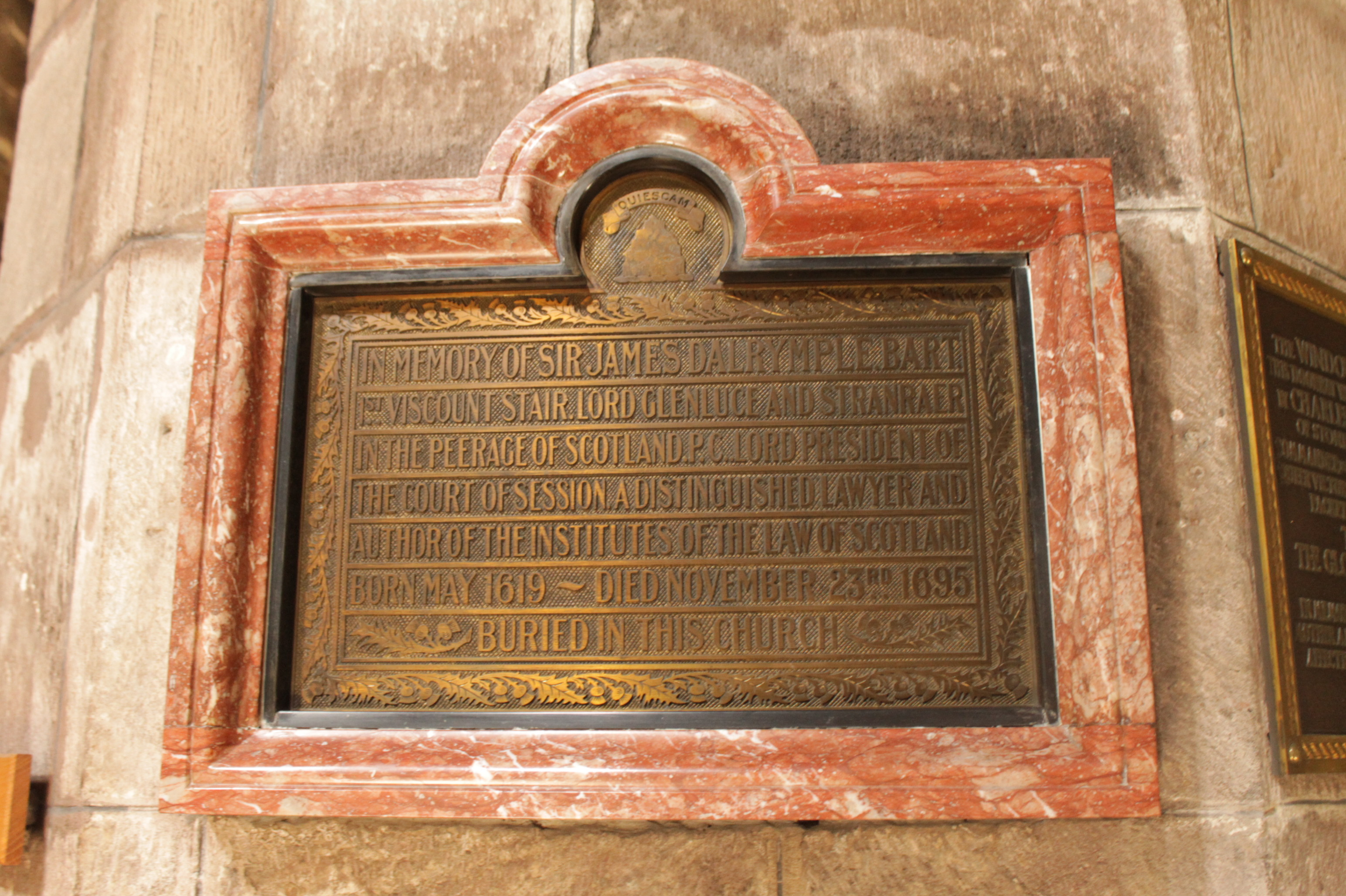
Memorial to Sir James Dalrymple, 1st Viscount Stair, St Giles Cathedral

Stair's major legal work, The Institutions of the Law of Scotland deduced from its Originals, and collated with the Civil, Canon and Feudal Laws and with the Customs of Neighbouring Nations, shows influences from his philosophical training, his foreign travels, and Continental jurists as well as English lawyers. Its name lives on in the Stair Memorial Encyclopaedia, which provides a contemporary statement of the Laws of Scotland.

The Physiologia was favourably noticed by Robert Boyle.

== Offspring ==
Stair was fortunate in his descendants. "The family of Dalrymple", observed Sir Walter Scott, "produced within two centuries as many men of talent, civil and military, of literary, political and professional eminence, as any house in Scotland."

His five sons were all remarkable in their professions:

- John, Master of Stair (1648–1707), who succeeded as 2nd Viscount of Stair and was later created 1st Earl of Stair in 1703, an able lawyer and politician, who is, however, principally remembered for his part in the massacre of Glencoe, is dealt with above.
- Sir James Dalrymple, 1st Baronet, created a baronet in 1698, was one of the principal Clerks of Session, and a very thorough and accurate historical antiquary.
- Sir Hew Dalrymple of North Berwick (1652–1737) succeeded his father as president, and was reckoned one of the best lawyers and speakers of his time. He, too, was created a baronet in 1698.
- Thomas Dalrymple became physician to Queen Anne.
- Sir David Dalrymple, 1st Baronet (1665–1721), who was created a baronet in 1701, was Lord Advocate under Anne and George I. In 1709 he bought a fine Palladian mansion house, Whitehill (designed and built by the Scottish architect James Smith, 1645–1731), from Lord Bellenden and renamed it Newhailes. It stands to this day near Musselburgh, East Lothian, not far from Edinburgh. His grandson was the famous judge and historian, Lord Hailes.

Stair's grandson, John (1673–1747), rose to be a field-marshal and gained equal credit in war and diplomacy. He was ambassador in Paris (1715–1720), and, besides seeing service under Marlborough, was commander-in-chief of the British forces on the Continent in 1742, showing great gallantry at Dettingen. He had no son, and in 1707 had selected his nephew John (1720–1789) as heir to the title, but through a decision of the House of Lords in 1748 he only became 5th Earl, after his cousin James and James's son had succeeded as 3rd and 4th Earls. John's son, the 6th Earl, died without issue, and a cousin again succeeded as 7th Earl, his two sons becoming 8th and 9th Earls. The 8th Earl (1771–1853) was a general in the army, and Keeper of the Great Seal of Scotland. The 9th Earl's son and grandson succeeded as 10th and 11th Earls.

== Published works ==
- Theses logicae, metaphysicae, physicae, mathematicae, et ethicae. Glasgow, 1646 (partial translation available of section: Ethical Theses)
- An apology for Sir James Dalrymple of Stair, President of the Session, by himself ... Edinburgh, 1690 (which responds to the pamphlet by Robert Ferguson: The late proceedings and votes of the Parliament of Scotland)
- The decisions of the Lords of Council & Session, in the most important cases debate before them, with the Acts of Sederunt. As also, an alphabetical compend of the decisions, with an index of the Acts of Sederunt, and the pursuers and defenders names. From June 1661. to July 1681. ... observed by Sir James Dalrymple of Stair. 2 vols. Edinburgh, 1683
- The institutions of the law of Scotland, deduced from its originals, and collated with the civil, canon and feudal laws; and with the customs of neighbouring nations ... . Edinburgh, 1681 (which includes his:Modus litigandi, or form of process observed before the Lords of Council and Session in Scotland. Edinburgh, 1681)
- The institutions of the law of Scotland, deduced from its originals, and collated with the civil, canon and feudal laws, and with the customs of neighbouring nations. 2nd ed. Edinburgh, 1693
- The institutions of the law of Scotland, deduced from its originals, and collated with the civil, and feudal-laws, and with the customs of neighbouring nations. 3rd ed. Edinburgh, 1759
- The institutions of the law of Scotland deduced from its originals and collated with the civil, canon and feudal laws and with the customs of neighbouring nations. New ed. 2 vols. Edinburgh, 1832.
- The institutions of the law of Scotland deduced from its originals, and collated with the civil, canon and feudal laws, and with the customs of neighbouring nations … ; edited by David M. Walker. Edinburgh : University Presses of Edinburgh and Glasgow, 1981. ISBN 0-85224-397-9 (Text based on the 1693 edition)
- The laws of Scotland : Stair memorial encyclopaedia. Edinburgh : Butterworths, 1999-
- Physiologia nova experimentalis in qua generales notiones Aristotelis, Epicuri, & Cartesii supplentur errores deteguntur & emendantur …. Lugduni-Batavorum [Leiden], [1686]

== Sources ==
Legal offices
Preceded by Sir John Gilmour of Craigmillar	Lord President of the Court of Session; 1671–1681	Succeeded by The Earl of Aberdeen
Preceded by Sir George Lockhart of Carnwath	Lord President of the Court of Session; 1689–1695	Succeeded by Lord North Berwick
Peerage of Scotland
New title	Viscount of Stair; 1690–1695	Succeeded by John Dalrymple
Baronetage of Nova Scotia
New creation	Baronet (of Stair); 1664–1695	Succeeded by John Dalrymple
