= William Crichton-Dalrymple, 5th Earl of Dumfries =

Scottish peer

The Right Honourable The Earl of Dumfries KT
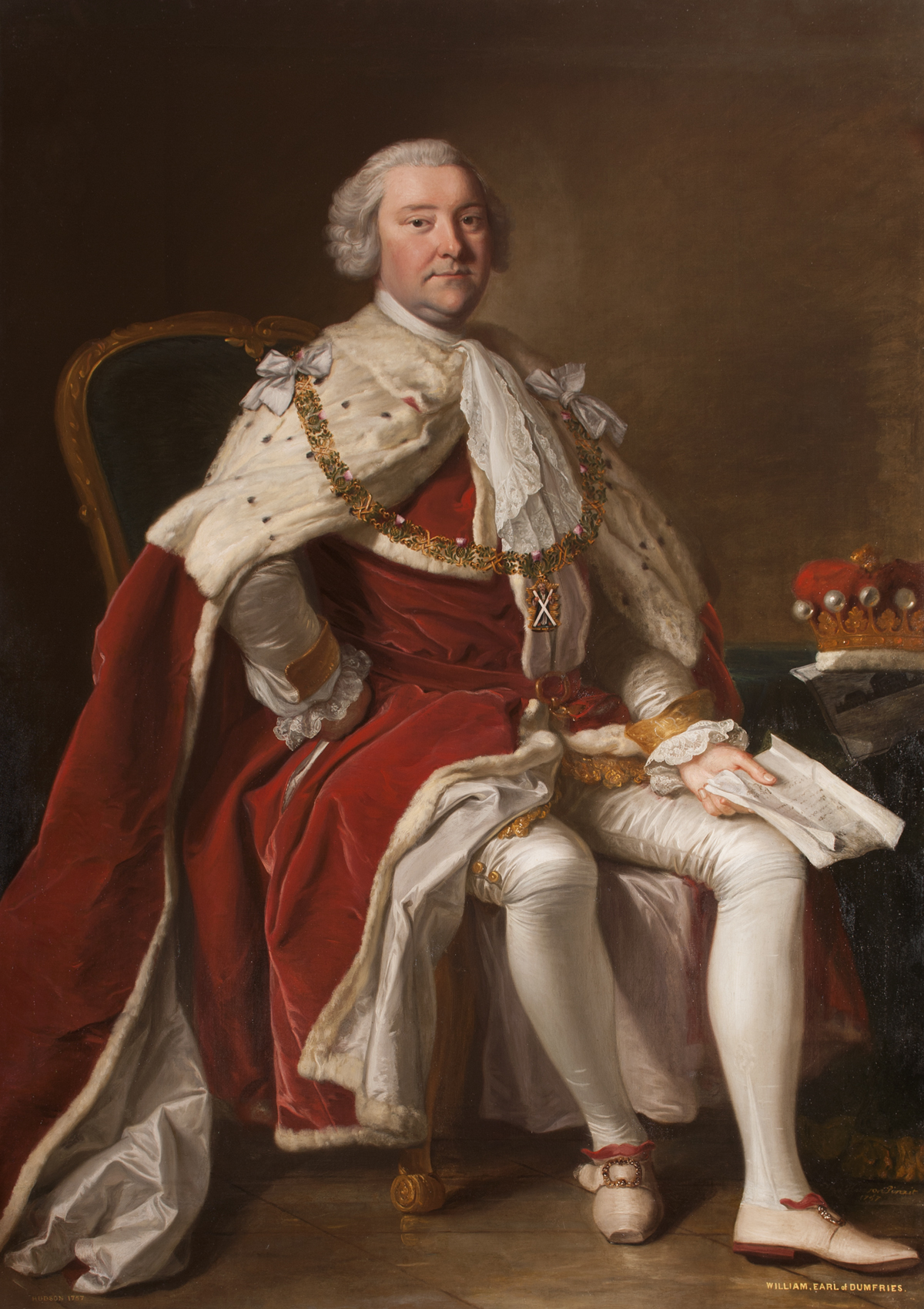
- Predecessor: Penelope Crichton, 4th Countess of Dumfries
- Successor: Patrick McDouall-Crichton, 6th Earl of Dumfries
- Died: 27 July 1768; Dumfries House
- Issue: William Crichton (1734–1744)
- Father: William Dalrymple of Glenmure
- Mother: Penelope Crichton, 4th Countess of Dumfries

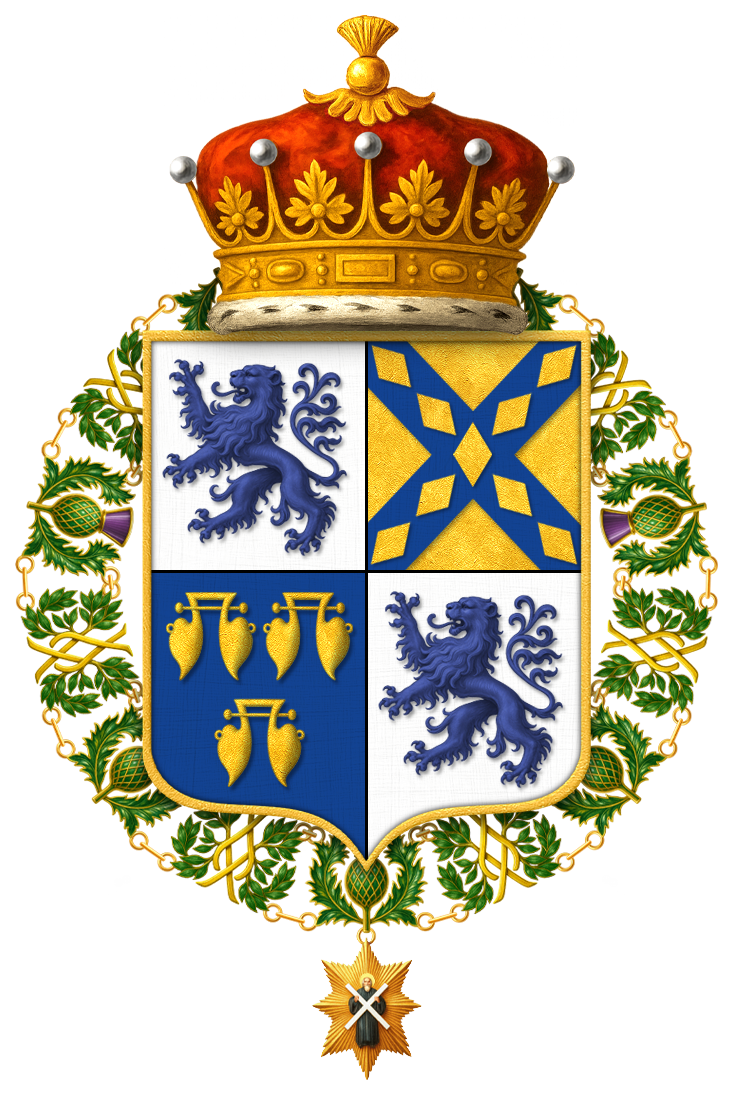
Shield of arms of William Crichton-Dalrymple, 5th Earl of Dumfries, 4th Earl of Stair, KT

William Crichton-Dalrymple, 5th Earl of Dumfries, 4th Earl of Stair, KT (1699 – 27 July 1768) was a Scottish peer. He inherited the title of Earl of Dumfries in 1742, upon the death of his mother Penelope Crichton, 4th Countess of Dumfries. He also held the heritable position of the Sheriff of Clackmannan from 1742 until heritable sheriffdoms were abolished in 1747.

He served in the Army from 1721 to 1747, and was aide-de-Camp to his uncle, John Dalrymple, 2nd Earl of Stair, at the Battle of Dettingen in 1743.

He commissioned Robert Adam, and John Adam to build Dumfries House, which was completed between 1754 and 1759. He inherited the title of Earl of Stair in 1760 on the death of his brother, James Dalrymple, 3rd Earl of Stair.

== Family ==
His father was William Dalrymple of Glenmure and mother was Penelope Crichton, Countess of Dumfries.

He married Lady Anne Gordon, daughter of William Gordon, 2nd Earl of Aberdeen and Lady Mary Leslie, on 2 April 1731; they had one son:

- William Crichton, Lord Crichton (12 December 1734 – 9 September 1744)

He married Anne Duff, on 19 June 1762.

At his death the titles separated, the Earldom of Dumfries passing to his nephew Patrick McDouall-Crichton, 6th Earl of Dumfries while the Earldom of Stair passed to his cousin John Dalrymple.

Peerage of Scotland
Preceded by Penelope Crichton	Earl of Dumfries; 1742–1768	Succeeded by Patrick McDouall
Preceded by James Dalrymple	Earl of Stair; 1760–1768	Succeeded by John Dalrymple
