= Sir James Dalrymple, 1st Baronet =

Scottish writer

Sir James Dalrymple, 1st Baronet (1650 – May 1719) was a Scottish writer who served as the Principal Clerk of Session. He was the son of the jurist James Dalrymple, 1st Viscount Stair (1619–1695). He is known as contributing to the debate over the Union between England and Scotland with his Collections Concerning the Scottish History (1705).

== Works ==
Dalrymple wrote:

- Apology for himself, 1690, Edinburgh, 1825.
- Collections concerning the Scottish History preceding the death of King David the First in 1153. Wherein the sovereignty of the Crown and independency of the Church are cleared, and an account given of the antiquity of the Scottish British Church and the noveltie of Popery in this Kingdom, Edinburgh, 1705. William Atwood published Remarks on the Collections, which were also adversely criticised by John Gillane (Gillan), biographer of John Sage, in 1714.
- A Vindication of the Ecclesiastical Part of Sir John Dalrymple's Historical Collections: in answer to a pamphlet entitled "The Life of Mr. John Sage", Edinburgh, 1714.

Baronetage of Nova Scotia
New creation	Baronet (of Cranstoun); 1698–1719	Succeeded by John Dalrymple
