= James Dalrymple, 3rd Earl of Stair =

James Dalrymple, 3rd Earl of Stair (died 13 November 1760), was the son of Colonel William Dalrymple of Glenmure and Penelope Crichton, Countess of Dumfries. He succeeded his uncle John Dalrymple, 2nd Earl of Stair, but was required to bring a legal action to establish his right to the title, as his uncle had attempted to settle the title on another nephew.

He died without issue. His siblings were William Dalrymple-Crichton, 5th Earl of Dumfries (b. 1716 - d. 27 July 1768), who succeeded as 4th Earl of Stair and Lady Elizabeth Dalrymple.

== Sources ==
- Burke's Peerage, Baronetage & Knightage, 107th edition, volume 1, page 602 (Charles Mosley, editor)

Peerage of Scotland
Preceded by John Dalrymple	Earl of Stair; 1747–1760	Succeeded by William Dalrymple-Crichton
