= Pierre Claude François Delorme =

French painter

Pierre Claude François Delorme (1783–1859) was a French painter and printmaker. He studied art under Anne-Louis Girodet de Roussy-Trioson. He exhibited at The Salon in Paris from 1810 to 1851. He lithographed many compositions after Girodet-Trioson.

His most important works include The Death of Abel, Hero and Leander, Rising of the Daughter of Jairus, Descent of Christ into Limbo, and Cephalus Carried Off by Aurora. Christ in Limbo (1819) is among the collection of the Notre-Dame-de-la-Croix de Ménilmontant.

He held art workshops in his studio for young girls. One of his students was Henriette Deluzy-Desportes, the granddaughter of politician and diplomat Félix Desportes.

== Gallery ==
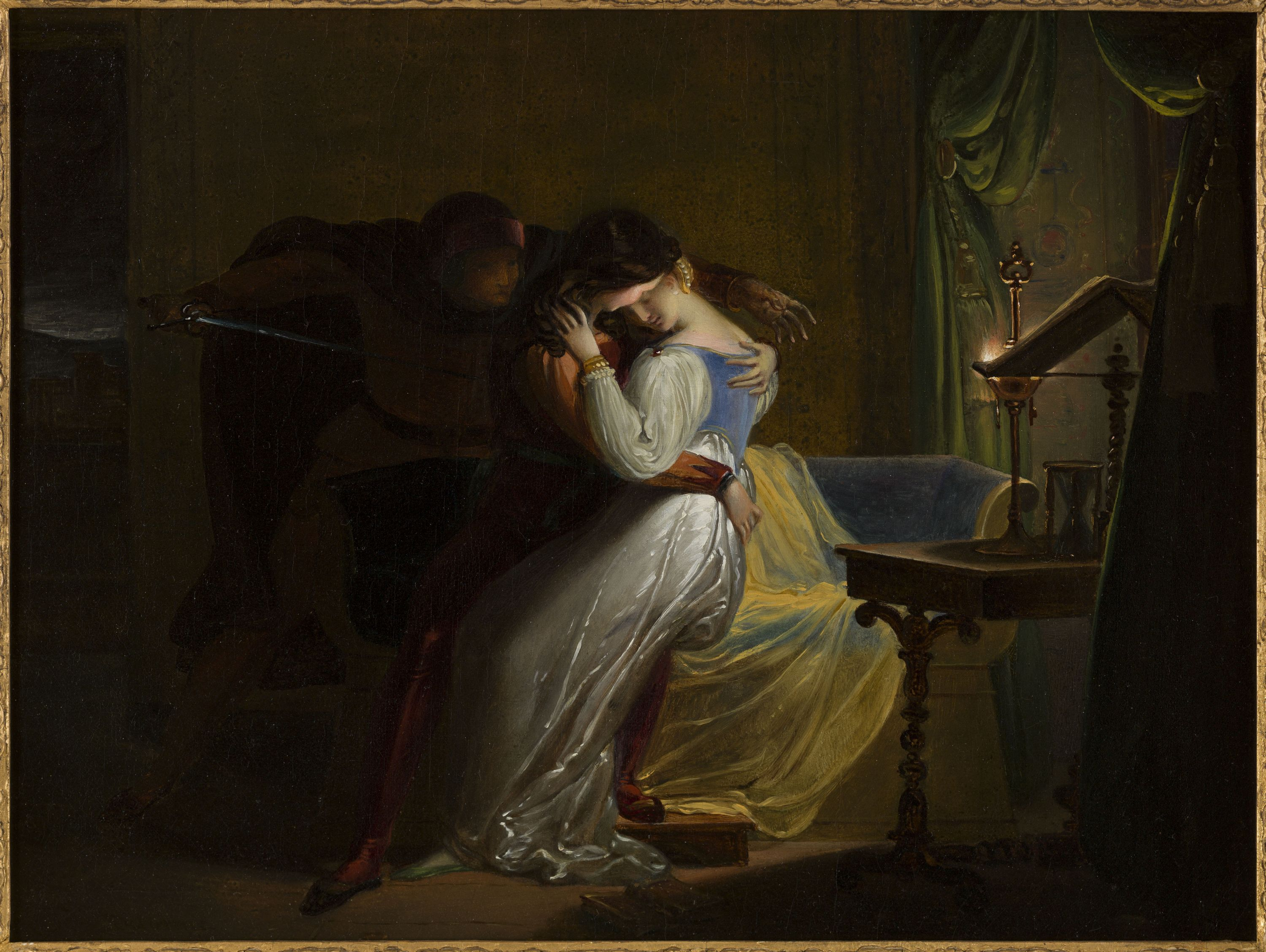
Paolo and Francesca, Musée de la Vie Romantique

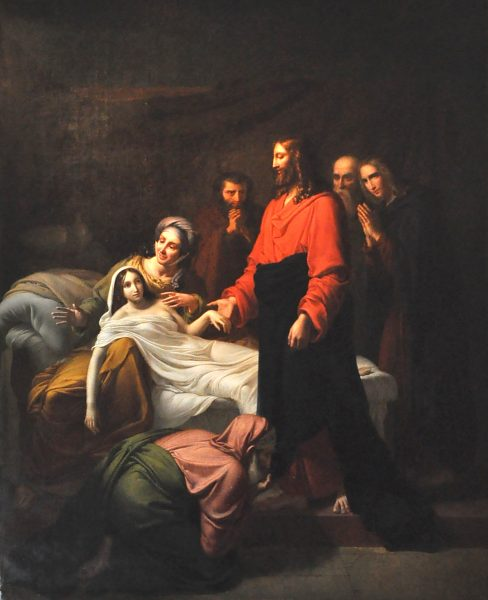
Jesus Raising the Daughter of Jairus, 1817

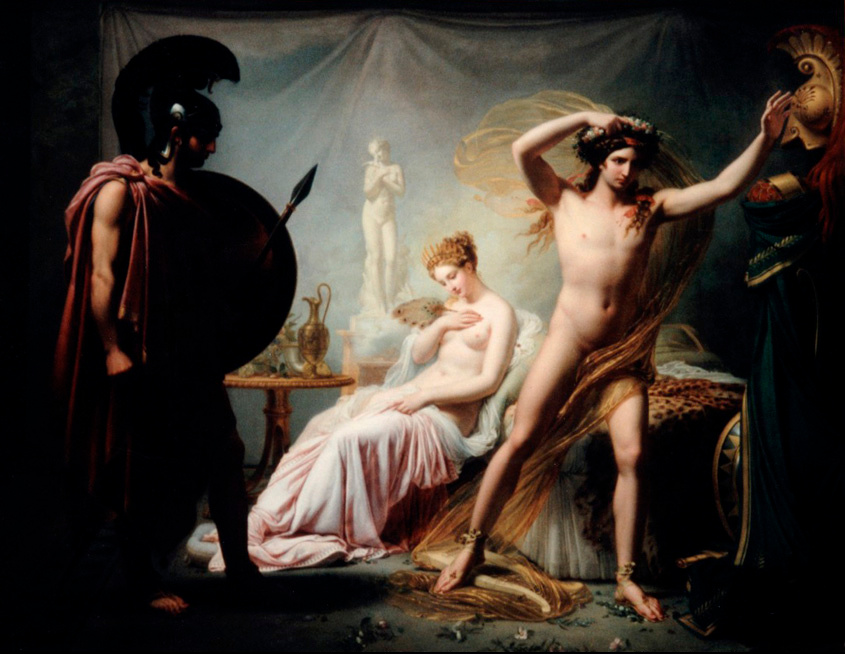
Hector reproaching Pâris, 1824, Amiens, Musée de Picardie

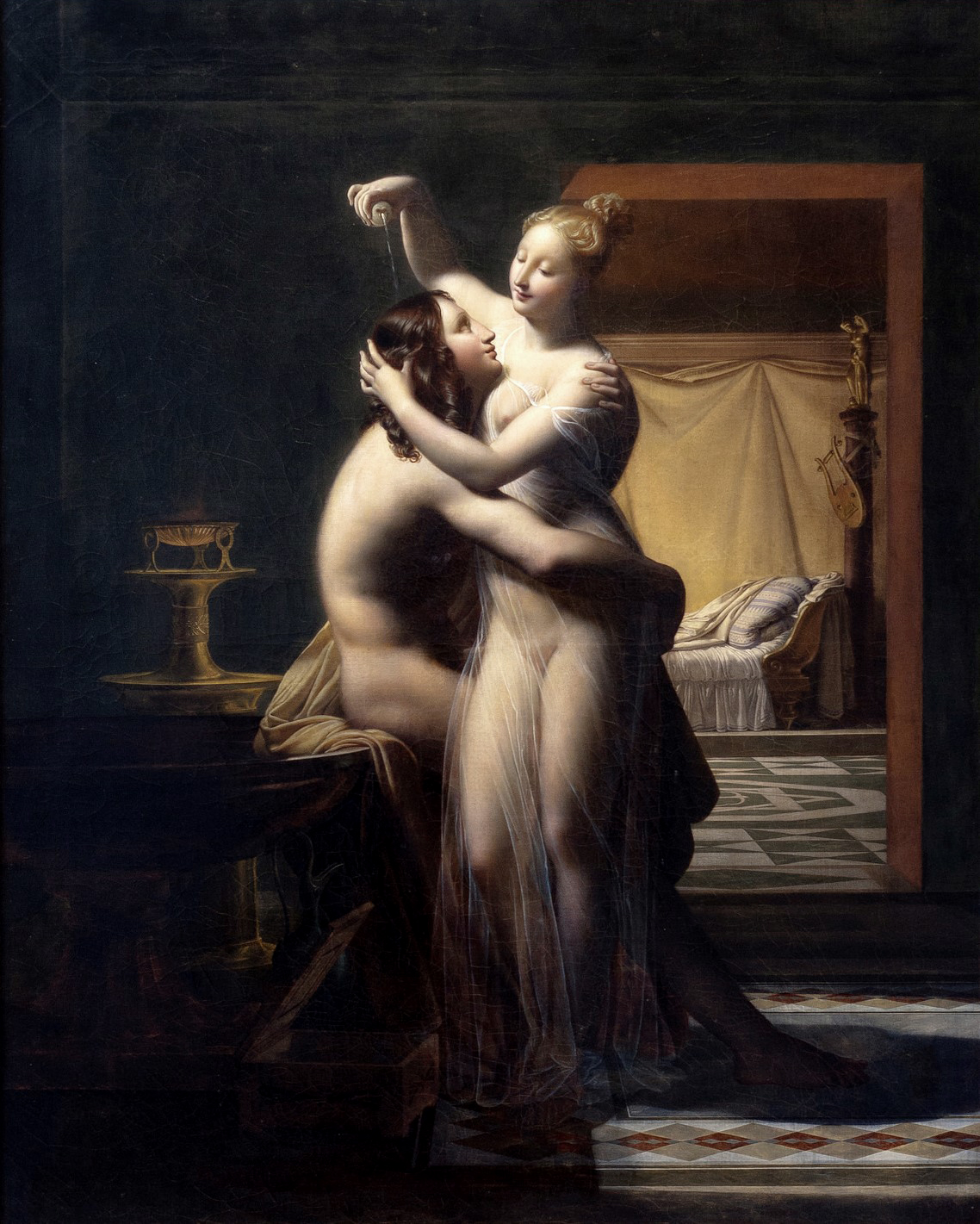
Héro and Léandre, 1814, Musée des beaux-arts de Brest.

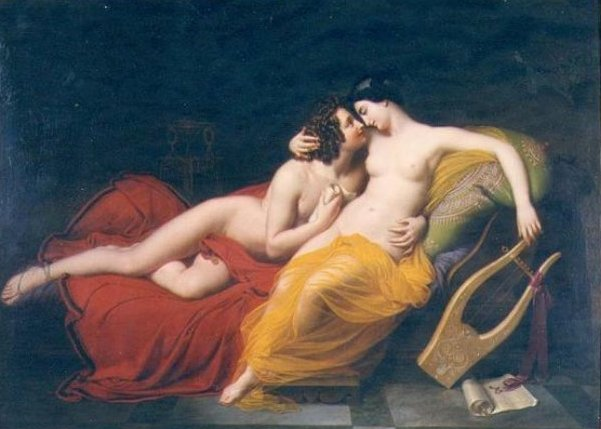
Sapho and Phaon, 1833, Musée d'Elbeuf

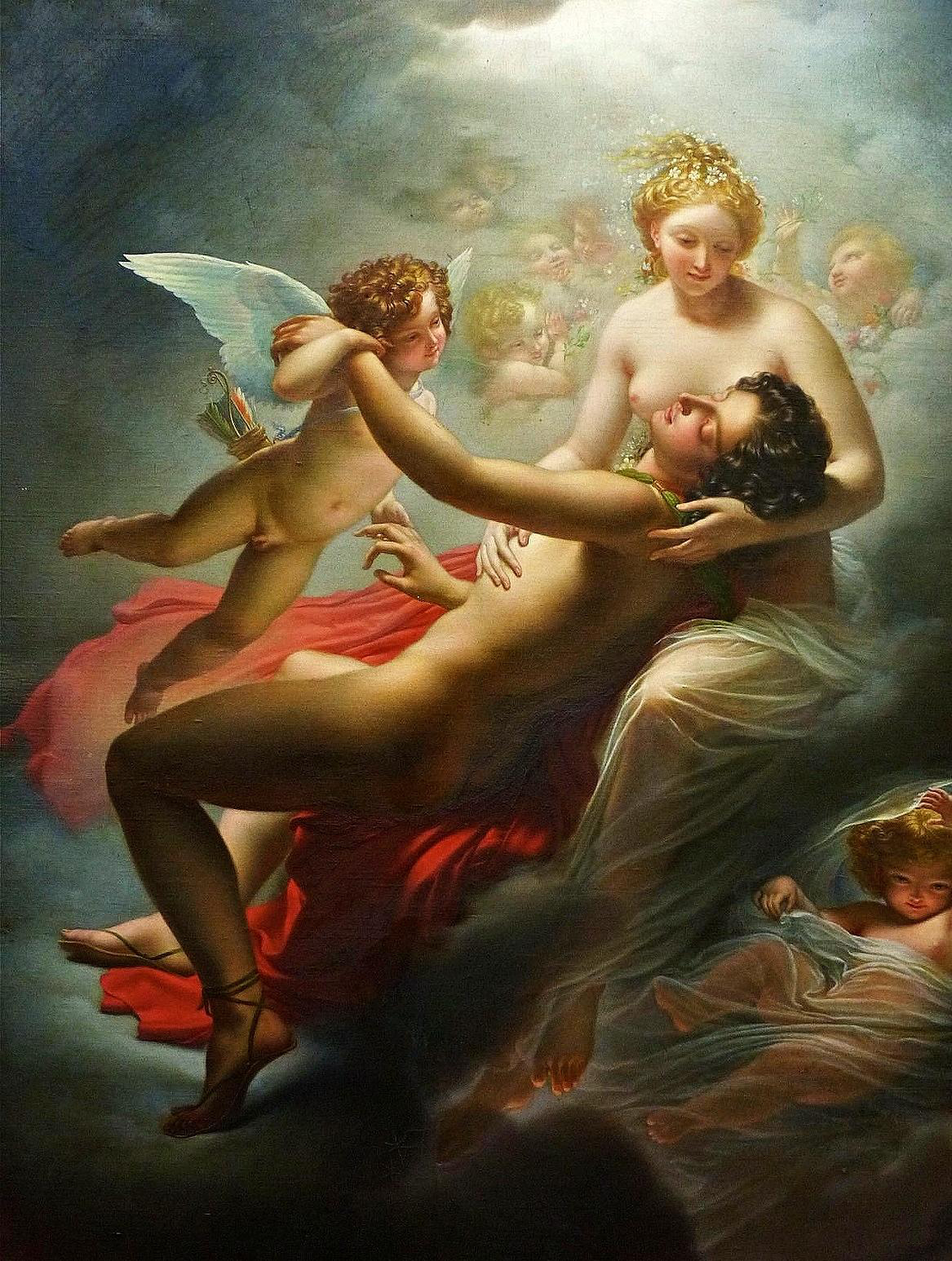
Céphale Carried off by Aurora, 1851, Musée de Sens
