= Lucinda Musgrave =

Socialite (1833–1920)

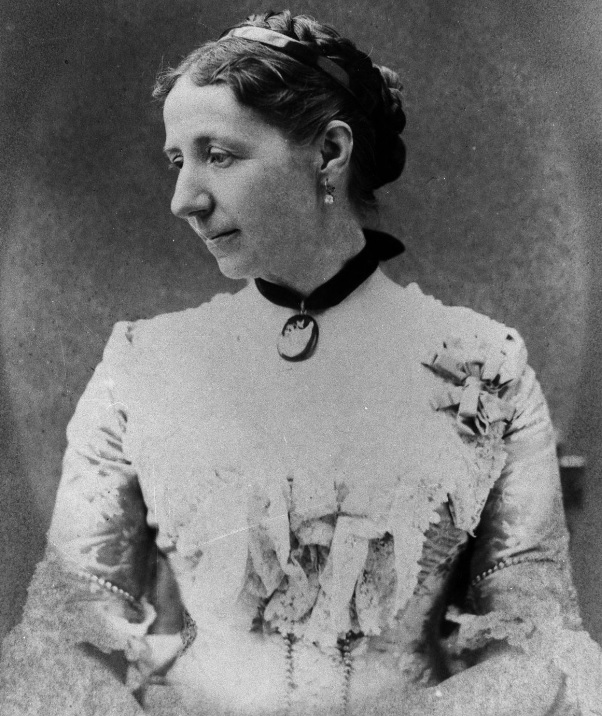
Lady Lucinda Musgrave in 1883, Courtesy of State Library of Queensland

Born Jeanie Lucinda Field (1833–1920), Lady Lucinda Musgrave was a prominent American-born promoter of women's charitable projects in at least three British colonies, then in Britain of conservative politics, and the anti-suffrage movement.

== Early life in the US ==
Jeanie Lucinda Field was born on 9 October 1833 in Massachusetts, probably in a family home in Stockbridge She was still a two-year-old when her mother, Jane Lucinda (née Hopkins), died of consumption in January 1836. and she and two siblings would be raised by a nanny until her father, David Dudley Field II (1805–1894), married his second wife, Harriet Davidson, in 1841. Her father was a lawyer who would later achieve national distinction as a reformer and briefly represent New York in the US House of Representatives as a Democrat. Through him and other family members, from an early age Jeanie would meet leading figures in American law, politics and other fields. For example, in August 1850, when she was 16, she accompanied the Moby-Dick author Herman Melville and fellow writers Nathaniel Hawthorne and Oliver Wendell Holmes Sr. on a hike and picnic up Monument Mountain in Massachusetts, then joined them for dinner at her father's summer home in Stockbridge in the evening. The 1855 New York State Census shows her living in New York City with her father, her step-mother, and her elder brother, Dudley, along with six house servants.

== Marriage and life in British Columbia ==
Among Jeanie's uncles, Stephen Johnson Field (1816–1899), would become the Chief Justice of California and later an Associate Justice of the US Supreme Court, and Henry Martyn Field (1822–1907), became a well-known author. However, it seems she was closest to another uncle, Cyrus West Field (1819–1892). His New York home was next door to her father's, and even connected by a hallway, and it's likely she met her future husband through him. Cyrus had won fame in 1858 as one of the driving forces behind the laying of the first telegraph cable across the Atlantic Ocean. In 1866, he befriended the Antigua-born British imperial civil servant, Anthony Musgrave (1828–1888) at the time of the laying of a new trans-Atlantic cable from Britain to Newfoundland, where Musgrave was the Governor. The following year, Musgrave stayed in New York as a guest of Cyrus. When Jeanie married Musgrave on 20 June 1870 he had become the Governor of another British colony in North America, British Columbia. The marriage was a five-minute ceremony in San Francisco performed by the Episcopal Bishop of California, Ingraham Kip. She was “given away” by Cyrus, even though her father was present. Often known as Lucinda Musgrave, she began almost two decades of life in British colonies. In the speech at the reception to mark the Governor's return to British Columbia with his new wife, hope was expressed that her being American would strengthen bilateral bonds with the US as the colony was joining the newly formed Canadian Confederation. Within days of British Columbia joining on 20 July 1871, the couple left for England. A short time later, Lucinda Musgrave gave birth in London to the couple's first child, Joyce Harriet Musgrave.

== Life in Natal ==
From England, Anthony Musgrave's next appointment was in southern Africa, as interim Lieutenant-Governor of the British colony of Natal. He and Lucinda arrived in Natal in September 1872 after what one report described as “five chequered and gloomy years” of administration by his predecessor, winning praise for his tact, good judgement and a lack of formality. Lucinda's ability to join her husband in official or ceremonial duties may have been restricted for much of the time they were in Natal by the fact that she was pregnant with their second child. Dudley Field Musgrave (1873–1895), named after her father, was born on 5 Jan 1873 in Pietermaritzburg. Soon after the birth, the couple received news of his appointment as the next Governor of South Australia. A few months later, at an official farewell ceremony in Durban, “universal regret” was expressed among the colonists that the Musgraves were leaving after only nine months.

== Life in South Australia ==
Not long after the couple arrived to a relatively low-key welcome in the South Australian capital, Adelaide, in June 1873, In a speech delivered on her behalf by Musgrave, she expressed her determination to join not only the “social pleasures and duties” of being the Governor's wife, but also “the sorrows and griefs” of the community in which she was living. The speech came after she had laid the foundation stone for “cottage homes for the aged poor” in North Adelaide. Notably, she made no mention of Aboriginal South Australians, instead stressing the worthiness of an institution set up to help elderly colonists from Britain who had “endured hardships and privations” as “early settlers”. Lucinda had already become the patroness of Adelaide's Orphan Home, which trained orphaned girls to be domestic workers. Later, she would also lay the foundation stone for the first home for convalescent patients from the Adelaide Hospital. A committee of women had worked quietly to raise funds for the project, and Musgrave also made a “handsome donation”.

Many events in the early stages of her time in South Australia should have been joyous for Lucinda. Her husband's appointment had proved popular, with the South Australian parliament showing its satisfaction by commissioning a new government steamer named The Governor Musgrave. On 10 March 1874, she gave birth to the couple's third child, Arthur David Musgrave (1874–1931). She then learned that her beloved father, David, had arrived in Adelaide by ship on a round-the-world trip that same day to visit for a few weeks. However, a few months later, just after the newly built steamer arrived in Adelaide from Sydney, tragedy struck. On October 9, 1874, Lucinda's 41st birthday, three-year-old Joyce Harriet Musgrave accidentally fell into a bath of hot water being prepared by her nurse. Joyce died two days later from the severe scalding she'd received.

Lucinda was pregnant at the time of the loss of her daughter, giving birth to another son, Herbert, on 11 May 1875. A few months later, it was learned that her husband had been knighted by Queen Victoria. For the rest of his life, he was known as Sir Anthony Musgrave, and she became Lady Lucinda Musgrave. The couple continued official and social duties in South Australia without controversy until news came through in late 1876 of another promotion for him, this time to be Governor of Jamaica. At a farewell function at Government House in January 1877, Lucinda entertained “a large number of ladies and the gentlemen accompanying them”. In her address, she said she was taking away two children born in Adelaide who must always have a personal interest in their birthplace, and to her the city would always be “inexpressibly dear” to her, a probable reference to it being the burial place of her daughter, Joyce. When the Musgraves sailed out of Adelaide on their way to the West Indies, they left behind a land sub-division in the south-east corner of the colony called “the Hundred of Joyce”, named after their daughter, and within it, plans for a new township called Lucindale.

== Life in Jamaica ==
The Jamaica appointment presented more opportunities for Lucinda to catch up with her then 72-year-old father, David. She arrived in Jamaica in October 1877, having given her father “unspeakable happiness” by visiting him at his home in Stockton, Massachusetts, on the way. Her father would visit Jamaica in 1880 and go with Lucinda into the rugged hills of St Andrew, overlooking Kingston city and harbour, where she and her family sought refuge from the summer heat in a vine-covered cottage called Flamstead. During the visit, she pointed out to her father a treacherous mountain hillside where she'd been thrown from a runaway horse. “It is a frightful place, and it was a miracle that she was not killed,” he recorded.

During her time in Jamaica, Lucinda would accompany her husband in performing the same sort of social and ceremonial functions she had performed in Adelaide. However, her most notable achievement would be as the founder of what would become known as the Lady Musgrave Women's Self-help Society. This group was established in 1879 “for the instruction of poor women of the better class in various kinds of ornamental and fancy work, with a view to the sale of such work in the US and elsewhere”. To women who provided certificates of commendation from their local clergymen, the Society offered six months of free classes in needlework and straw-plaiting, if they didn't have other craft skills. For a fee, women could market their crafts through the Society, then keep the profits. Members of the Society expressed sadness in 1883 when they heard that Lucinda would be leaving Jamaica, following her husband's appointment as the next Governor of the colony of Queensland. In a formal address on the eve of her departure in April 1883, the committee of the Society in Kingston told Lucinda that “sad hearts have been cheered by your kindness, bitter needs relieved by your charity, dark lives brightened by your thoughtful wisdom” Hundreds of members of the Society in the outer district of Portland would sign a statement expressing similar sentiments.

== Life in Queensland ==
After arriving in Brisbane in November 1883, Lucinda would again take on a range of social and ceremonial functions, often alongside her husband, but sometimes on her own account. Organisations of which she agreed to be patron included the Lady Bowen Hospital in Brisbane, named after one of her predecessors, the Brisbane Charity Organisation Society, and the Brisbane Industrial Home, which offered training and “shelter, relief and Christian sympathy to fallen and friendless women who have resolved to lead a new life”. She also travelled extensively to other parts of Queensland with Musgrave, and became involved in charity projects outside Brisbane. For example, within months of her agreeing to become patron of a safe maternity facility for women in Maryborough, enough funds had been raised for the new “Lady Musgrave Lying-In Hospital” to begin receiving patients.

Much of Lucinda's charity work in Queensland would involve helping young single women who arrived in the colony as immigrants from Britain or other colonies. Her involvement began in 1884 after she became the inaugural patron of the Young Women's Institute. Emanating from the Young Women's Christian Association, the Institute provided temporary safe accommodation in Brisbane for women who could demonstrate “respectability of character” and who were seeking work as teachers or governesses. After concerns were voiced at public meetings that similar help was needed for young women seeking other types of work, and who didn't necessarily have anyone to vouch for their characters, a women's committee headed by Lucinda established the Lady Musgrave Lodge in Brisbane in June 1885. After a few months of operation, girls who had stayed at the Lodge had found employment as general servants, housemaids, nurses, dressmakers and shop assistants. By 1888, when a new government “depot” opened to receive immigrant women in Brisbane, demand for places in the Lady Musgrave Lodge did not dwindle, with the majority of young women using it being locally-born single girls engaged as domestic servants. In 1892 the organisation purchased its own building. Durham-born Sarah Goldsmith (1846–1903) would meet immigrant women as they disembarked to offer accommodation. Goldsmith was president from 1903 to 1931 and during that time the organisations fundraising paid off the £4,000 mortgage that had built the lodge.

A week after the last meeting of the Lodge that she would attend, just a few minutes into her 55th birthday on 9 October 1888, Musgrave died unexpectedly at Government House in Brisbane. “My life today has gone out,” she recorded in her diary. It was reported that soon after Musgrave's funeral, Lucinda would return to Britain, where her sons were at boarding school. Before she left Queensland, she would receive numerous messages of condolence, including from organisations which she had supported in her vice-regal role. Many local newspaper reports lamenting Musgrave's death and praising his time as Governor also paid tribute to her. “It is impossible to exaggerate the utility of her practical interest in the social work of this city: an interest which has been active and generous,” wrote one Brisbane paper. “In all works of charity, more especially in any object for the benefit of women and children, Lady Musgrave’s name was ever to the fore; and not her name alone, but her time, her services, and her open hands,” wrote another.

== Life in Britain ==
On her arrival in London in December 1888, Lucinda was met by her father, who had sent a telegraph promising to meet her there as soon as he heard of Musgrave's death. For a time, she lived in a house close to the famous Harrow school so her three sons could attend it. Her father, David, would become a regular visitor from America. When he made his last overseas trip against doctors’ advice to see her and her sons in 1894, they had finished their studies at Harrow, and she had moved to a 400-year-old house called “Hurst-an-Clays” at East Grinstead in Sussex. Dudley had joined the Royal Navy, Arthur was at military school at Woolwich, and the youngest, Herbert, had applied to join the same school. Not long after returning to New York after visiting her, Lucinda's father died in April 1894. He left the bulk of his considerable estate to Lucinda, “the one he loved most on earth”.

In April 1895, Lucinda was struck by tragedy again, with the loss of a second child, Dudley, who died of typhoid fever in Bombay (now Mumbai) as a Navy midshipman, aged 21. Perhaps in response, she joined the committee of the newly formed Colonial Nursing Association. Its aim was to provide more trained nurses throughout the British Empire to colonists who could afford to pay for private nursing services. Lucinda was an active member of the Association at least until the eve of World War I in June 1914. That war would cost her a third child. Her youngest son, Herbert, born in Adelaide in 1875, would be killed in action in France as an army major in June 1918, leaving behind a wife (née Georgiana Hopkins) and two children – one called Jeanie Lucinda Musgrave, after her grandmother.

Other organisations backed by Lucinda after she moved to Sussex were of a distinctly conservative political nature. These included the Primrose League, which supported the British Conservative Party and its candidates for election to the House of Commons. In the early 1900s, she became president of the East Grinstead branch of the League, and her home and its large gardens were used to host fund-raising events. At a time when many women in Britain were campaigning for voting rights, she also became president of the local branch of the Women's National Anti-Suffrage League, and also allowed her home to be used for its meetings. At one meeting, Lucinda reportedly stated that she thought that voting rights for women “would do a lot of harm”, adding that overall, women were not equal to men in endurance, intellect or “nervous energy”.

From her home in Sussex, Lucinda also spent considerable time organising memorials for her late husband in the various colonies in which he had been an administrator or governor. These included a church lectern in Nevis, a small boat called the Governor Musgrave to be used by a missionary group in British Columbia, and a competitive “shield” in his honour among members of the Church Lads’ Brigade in Newfoundland. Lucinda died at the age of 86 on 12 Aug 1920 at East Grinstead. She left an estate valued at just under £60,000. She was survived by one of her four children, Arthur David Musgrave, then a British army colonel.

== Legacy ==
The Lady Musgrave Women's Self-help Society in Jamaica continued to operate until at least the mid-1930s, well after her death, and more than 50 years after she left the colony. Although the Society had initially catered primarily for poor members of Jamaica's minority white and “coloured” communities, it was later seen as having helped to raise international awareness of Jamaican craft skills, including those based on African artwork. At the Colonial and Indian Exhibition in London in 1886, for example, the Society's display included items made of African lace-bark work, and a traditional Afro-Caribbean clay cooking pot, a yabba. The Society was also seen as an agent for change as it exposed many Jamaican women to organised mass movements for the first time, ahead of later campaigns for political, educational and legal rights for all communities.

In Australia, the Lady Musgrave Trust, originating from the Lodge, remained in operation in 2020, describing itself as “Queensland’s oldest charity and a champion for homeless women”. The Trust estimated it had so far helped about 10,000 vulnerable women and their children with shelter and other support services since its establishment in 1885.

In Britain, a report about Lady Musgrave and her support for the Anti-suffrage League would be used in the 21st Century in online educational materials for students learning about British history.

== Place and boat names ==
In addition to the township of Lucindale in South Australia, there is also a town called Lucinda near Ingham in Queensland, and there is a Lady Musgrave Island near the southern end of the Great Barrier Reef. At least as late as 2020, there was a Lady Musgrave Avenue in Kingston, Jamaica, and various Lady Musgrave thoroughfares in parts of Queensland.

Lucinda Musgrave also had boats named in her honour. In September 1884, a privately owned steamer called the Lady Musgrave, described as “one of the finest boats ever built in Queensland” was launched. It was used for Brisbane River trips and coastal trade. Around the same time, two new paddle steamers commissioned by the Queensland government – the Lucinda and the Musgrave – were built in England, though only the Lucinda survived the voyage to the colony, the Musgrave being wrecked after running aground near Colombo.
