= Henriette Deluzy-Desportes =

French artist (1813–1875)

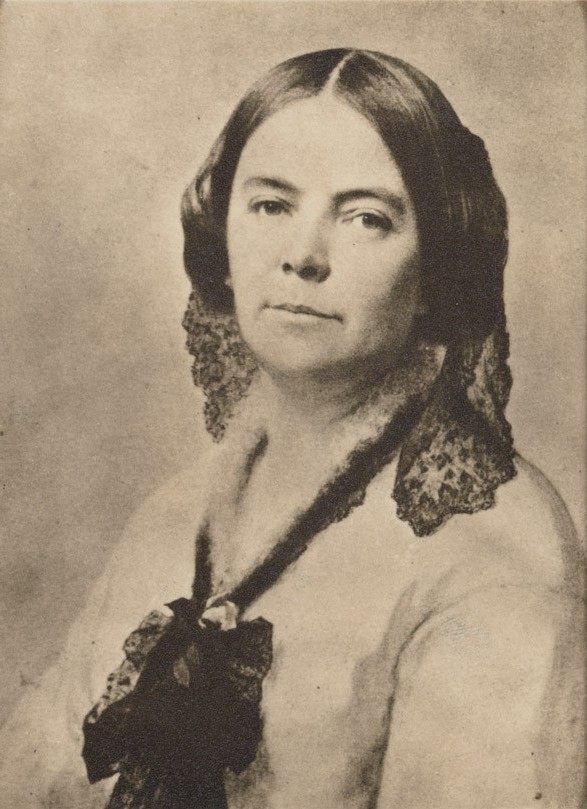
Henriette Deluzy Desportes Field

Henriette Deluzy-Desportes (Note: Before she was married, Henriette Deluzy-Desportes was known by several names. She was Henriette Deluzy when she worked for Sir Thomas Hislop, 1st Baronet in London. She was Mlle. Desportes when she came to the United States. In France, she was generally referred to as Henriette Deluzy-Desportes. She did not try to conceal her identity amongst her friends.) (1813–1875) was a French governess who was the subject of a scandal with Charles Laure Hugues Théobald, duc de Choiseul-Praslin. The scandal played a role in bringing down the King of France, Louis-Phillippe, and initiating the French Revolution of 1848. The story of her life in Paris was the basis for a book written by her great-niece and made into the movie All This, and Heaven Too starring Bette Davis in 1940.

She traveled to New York City in 1848 and was hired as a schoolteacher. In 1851, she married a minister Henry Martyn Field from Stockbridge, Massachusetts and was then known as Henriette Desportes Field.

She was a member of the School of Design for Women at Cooper Union's Advisory Council from 1859, when it was founded, until her death. She was principal of the art department in the early 1860s. She exhibited her works of art at the National Academy of Design. The Fields hosted eminent writers and artists at their home in Gramercy Park, Manhattan. Some of their regular guests were Harriet Beecher Stowe and Peter Cooper.

== Europe ==
=== Early life ===
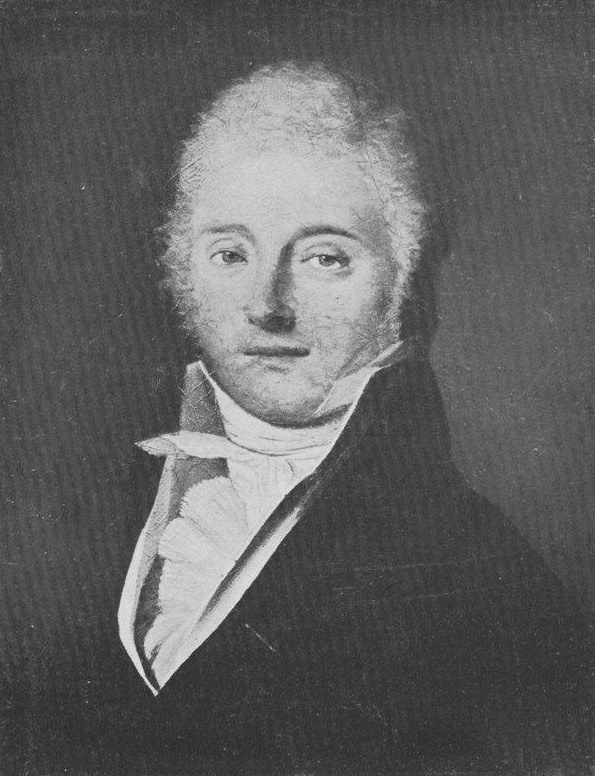
Johann Stephan Decker (1784-1844), Félix Desportes (1763–1849), September 1818. He was Henriette's maternal grandfather.

Henriette Deluzy-Desportes was born in Paris in 1813 to unmarried parents. Her mother, Lucile Desportes, was the daughter of Félix Desportes (1763–1849), the secretary to Lucien Bonaparte. Henriette's father was a French soldier, M. Delroze. The Desportes family did not approve of Delroze. (Note: Wright spells her name Lucille, but her name is generally spelled Lucile.) Lucile tried to convince her father that she should marry the man, but before that could happen, the soldier died during a campaign.

When she was born, her name was recorded as Henriette, without mention of her parents or a surname. Initially, Lucile and her father did not recognize their daughter and granddaughter. She grew up in the Roman Catholic faith and was educated at a French convent and a boarding school.

Lucile, who had been accustomed to a life of luxury, worked to pay for her daughter's education after her father was no longer able to consistently provide her an income.

Henriette was a talented artist. At thirteen, she was apprenticed to an engraver, Narjot. (Note: Perhaps Jean-Denis Nargeot.) She studied under Pierre Claude François Delorme, a painter. After her mother died of cholera in 1832, Lucile's uncle, Benjamin Desportes, brought Henriette into his home. Her grandfather Desportes gave Henriette 1,500 francs to complete her education.

Henriette was intelligent, beautiful, and well-educated. Even so, she was an orphaned child of unmarried parents, so she did not have the opportunities afforded to other young ladies from aristocratic families.

She studied English at Brixton Hill, London, under the name Henriette Deluzy. She then worked as a governess in Charlton, London for Sir Thomas Hislop, 1st Baronet, and his family. Known as Henriette Deluzy, her charge was Hislop's only child Emma, who later became the Countess of Minto (wife of William Elliot-Murray-Kynynmound, 3rd Earl of Minto).

=== Governess to the Praslin family ===
Françoise (Fanny) Altarice Rosalba Sebastiani, duchesse de Praslin, and Charles Laure Hugues Théobald, duc de Choiseul-Praslin, hired Henriette in 1841 to be the governess to their daughters, or their four youngest children. The Praslins had nine boys and girls. Although the family ran through a number of nannies, Henriette was employed by the family for six years.

Fanny thought that her role as mother and wife was usurped by Henriette. The Praslins had a difficult marriage. Fanny, who was wealthy, had a temperamental nature and she was either expressing her complaints or asking for forgiveness. She was jealous of the attention that the duke showed their children. Amongst those around the family, there were some who thought that she was mentally unbalanced. There were others, though, who thought the duke had been overbearing and insulting. He was also rumored to have had an affair with Henriette. The duke was described as uncaring, unfaithful, and distant to his wife. Fanny threatened her husband to fire Henriette, believing that they were having an affair, or she would divorce him. Henriette was released from her position in July 1847, without a letter of recommendation or credentials.

Henriette's and Felix Desporte's friends tried to find ways to provide her a secure future. The Remys tried to negotiate a marriage between Lieutenant-Colonel Bisson and Henriette. This would make it appear as if she left the Praslin's household to marry, rather than because of a scandal. Odilon Barrot tried to negotiate an inheritance of 40,000 francs and a trousseau from her Grandfather Desportes. She was also to receive a life pension from the Cahouet deed. The only advance that materialized was a gift of some savings by two of the Praslin's daughters, Louise and Berthe, to pay for a small room at the home of Mme Closter-Lemaire in The Marais in Paris. Mme Closter-Lemaire was the stepmother of Louis Ulbach.

After she left the Praslins, the duke paid her rent a few times. Henriette wrote him long letters; he responded by encouraging her to create a life with other people.

=== Murder ===
On August 17, 1847, Fanny was stabbed and bludgeoned in her bedchamber in Paris, just a few hours after the duke and their children visited Henriette at her new residence. Fanny had thirty wounds from a poniard. She was found by their servants who heard a struggle. The duke said that their house was invaded by an intruder. He said that he fought to remove the person, but he did not have much information about the prowler. He had a pistol and looked like he had been in a fight. A servant saw him washing his hands of blood. He declared that he was innocent.

Praslin was kept under guard to await a trial, but he committed suicide seven days after the murder by consuming two doses of arsenic. Henriette was also arrested due to the rumors of an affair. Unable to find evidence against her, though, she was freed. The case was dropped after three months, during which she defended herself as she was interrogated.

Fanny had kept journals, expressing how upset she was about "Mademoiselle D." Henriette became the topic of conversation at the time and was despised by many of the French people.

The French had been beset by poverty and a financial crisis. They revolted against the tyranny of the royal and aristocratic classes, who had a special court for their crimes. It was believed that the duke was one of the upper class who had special treatment, including being able to obtain poison. This was one more example of the disparity between the lives of the rich and the poor. Some thought that he faked his death and was living free. As the result of the revolt, King Louis Philippe I of France abdicated his throne in 1848.

Indeed, some historians have argued that the Praslin affair was one of several scandals which precipitated Louis-Philippe's demise and the 1848 revolution. Newspapers of the day carried impassioned invectives against the king and court as well as excerpts from the diaries and letters of the unfortunate Duchesse. Her writings inflamed public opinion even more as they revealed the extent of domestic unhappiness which had plagued the house at 55 rue Faubourg Saint-Honoré for years. Throughout Paris the Duc was decried as a vicious and brutal killer, his dead wife as a martyr, and the governess--held for questioning at the Conciergerie and not released until November 17, 1847--as an instigator of their unhappiness and a possible conspirator in the murder of the Duchesse.

— L'affaire Praslin and All This, and Heaven Too: gender, genre, and history in the 1940s woman's film

== United States ==
=== Teacher ===
Parisian ministers Adolphe and Frédéric Monod arranged for her travel to the United States. They provided lodging in Frédéric and his wife's home, and they arranged for employment for her in the United States. Known as Mlle. Desportes, she came to New York on September 13, 1849, where she worked as an art and French teacher for Miss Henrietta B. Haines. The school, Miss Haine's School for Girls, was located at 10 Gramercy Park. Henriette told her students her side of the story as a way to manage the gossip that was spread about her. She won the "sympathy and allegiance" of her students.

The newspapers portrayed her as a party to Fanny's murder in 1847, but her American friends considered her a brave, innocent woman. The Praslin children corresponded with her after she moved to the United States.

=== Marriage ===
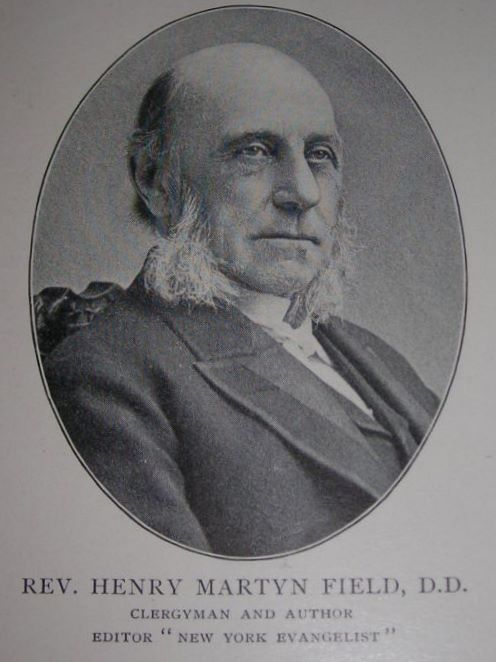
Rev. Henry Martyn Field

She was introduced to the minister Henry Martyn Field by the Monod brothers in France or soon after she arrived in New York. Field had visited France in 1847 and 1848. Nine years younger than her, Field was also a writer and editor. He was the minister of a West Springfield, Massachusetts church. They were married in New York City on May 20, 1851, by his father, Reverend David Dudley Field, a Congregational minister. They had homes in Stockbridge and East Springfield, Massachusetts as well as in New York City. They spent their summers in Stockbridge and they occasionally traveled to Europe.

=== Gramercy Park salon ===
Field was a minister in West Springfield until 1854, when he became part owner and an editor of the Evangelist in New York. The Fields entertained a large group of friends who were eminent in art and literature, like Eastman Johnson who painted her portrait in 1875. Samuel Morse, Harriet Beecher Stowe, Fanny Kemble, and William Cullen Bryant regularly attended their salon in Gramercy Park. Henriette was considered an intelligent, charming hostess.

=== Artist and educator ===
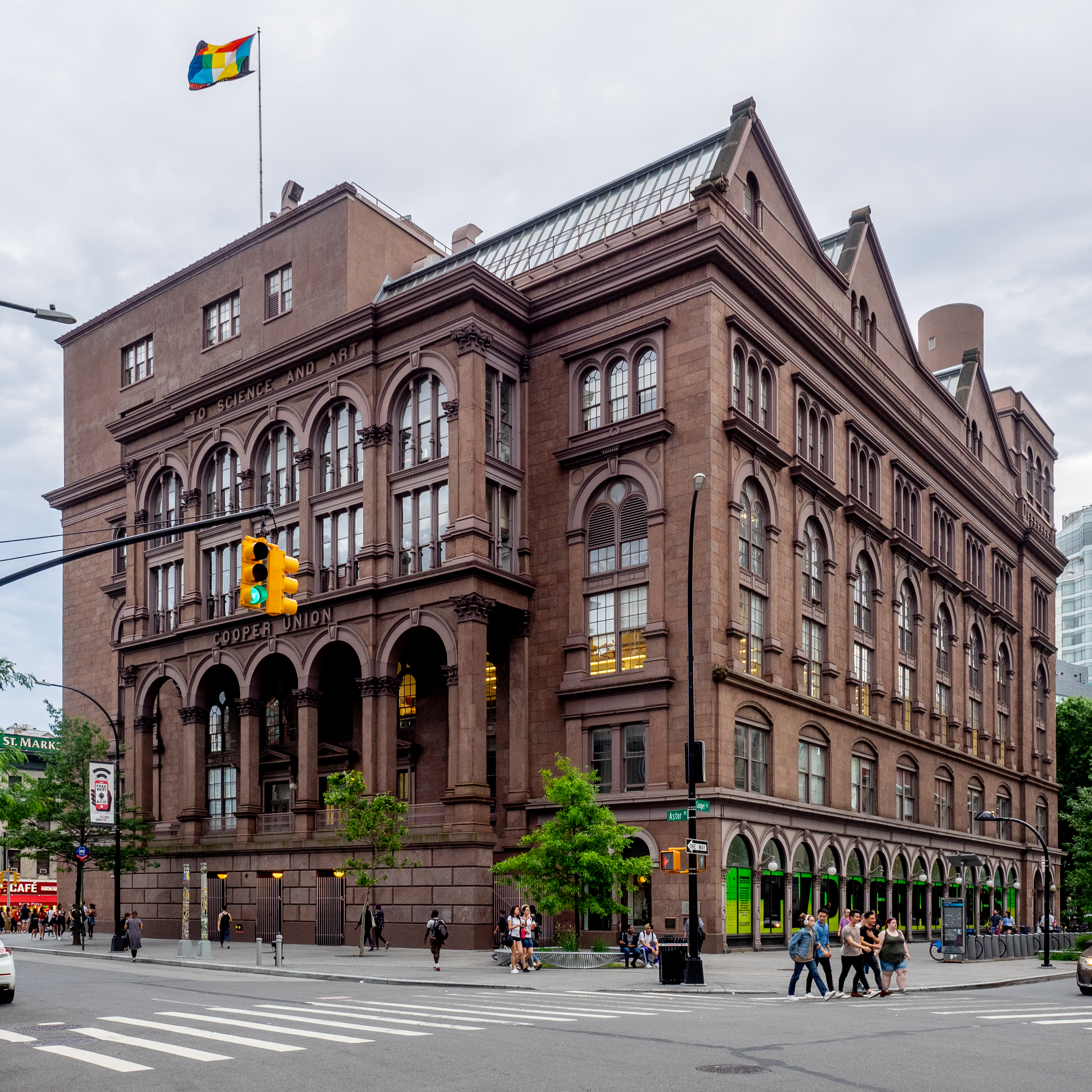
Cooper Union

She was a member of the School of Design for Women at Cooper Union's Advisory Council from 1859, when it was founded, until her death. She was principal of the art department in the early 1860s. She exhibited her works of art at the National Academy of Design, including some of her crayon portraits. Cooper Union has some of her pencil sketches. She also painted portraits and landscapes. For a period of time, she taught adults the French language and literature in the evenings. Henriette was a member of the Association for the Advancement of Truth in Art, which was first convened by Thomas Charles Farrer in January 1863.

She made a pastel portrait of Maria Malleville Wheelock Smith (granddaughter of William Allen and Maria Malleville Wheelock) and an unidentified girl around 1865 which has been among the collection of the Stockbridge Library Association. The association has also owned two charcoal drawings that Henriette made of Clara Field (1851–1921) around 1858 and around 1862.

=== Death ===
Henriette died of cancer in New York City on March 6, 1875. The funeral, led by William Adams, was held at the Madison Square Presbyterian Church in New York City. Peter Cooper and William Cullen Bryant were two of her pallbearers. She was buried in Stockbridge.

Looking back on her life, she quoted Matthew Henry (1662–1714): "All this, and Heaven, too", which became the name of the book written about her by Rachel Field, her grand-niece. Henriette was known in the Field family for her "courage, goodness, and gallant spirit".

The book Home sketches in France, and other papers of the late Mrs. Henry M. Field was published the year of her death. Henry Martyn Field married for a second time after Henriette's death.

== Popular culture ==
- Field's great niece, Rachel Field wrote the best seller All This, and Heaven Too about Deluzy-Desportes's life in France. It was made into a film starring Bette Davis in 1940.
- The character Miriam in The Marble Faun, Nathaniel Hawthorne's story of the Praslin's murder and suicide, is based upon Henriette.
- Stanley Loomis wrote A Crime of Passion in 1967 about Henriette and the Praslin murder and scandal in 1967. Like Rachel Field, he is a resident of Stockbridge, Massachusetts.

== Sources ==
- Field, Henriette Desportes; Field, Mrs Henry M. (1875). Home Sketches in France, and Other Papers. G.P. Putnam's Sons.
  - "A Remarkable Life Ended", The Evening Post, 1875, pages 20–27
  - "Mrs. Henry M. Field", by George Ripley, The New York Tribune, 1875, pages 28–31
  - "Mrs. Henry M. Field", by Charles Loring Brace, The New York Times, 1875, pages 32–35
- Wright, Nathalia (1942). "Hawthorne and the Praslin Murder". The New England Quarterly. 15 (1): 5–14. doi:10.2307/360227. ISSN 0028-4866. JSTOR 360227.
