= David Dudley Field II =

American lawyer and politician (1805–1894)

David D. Field
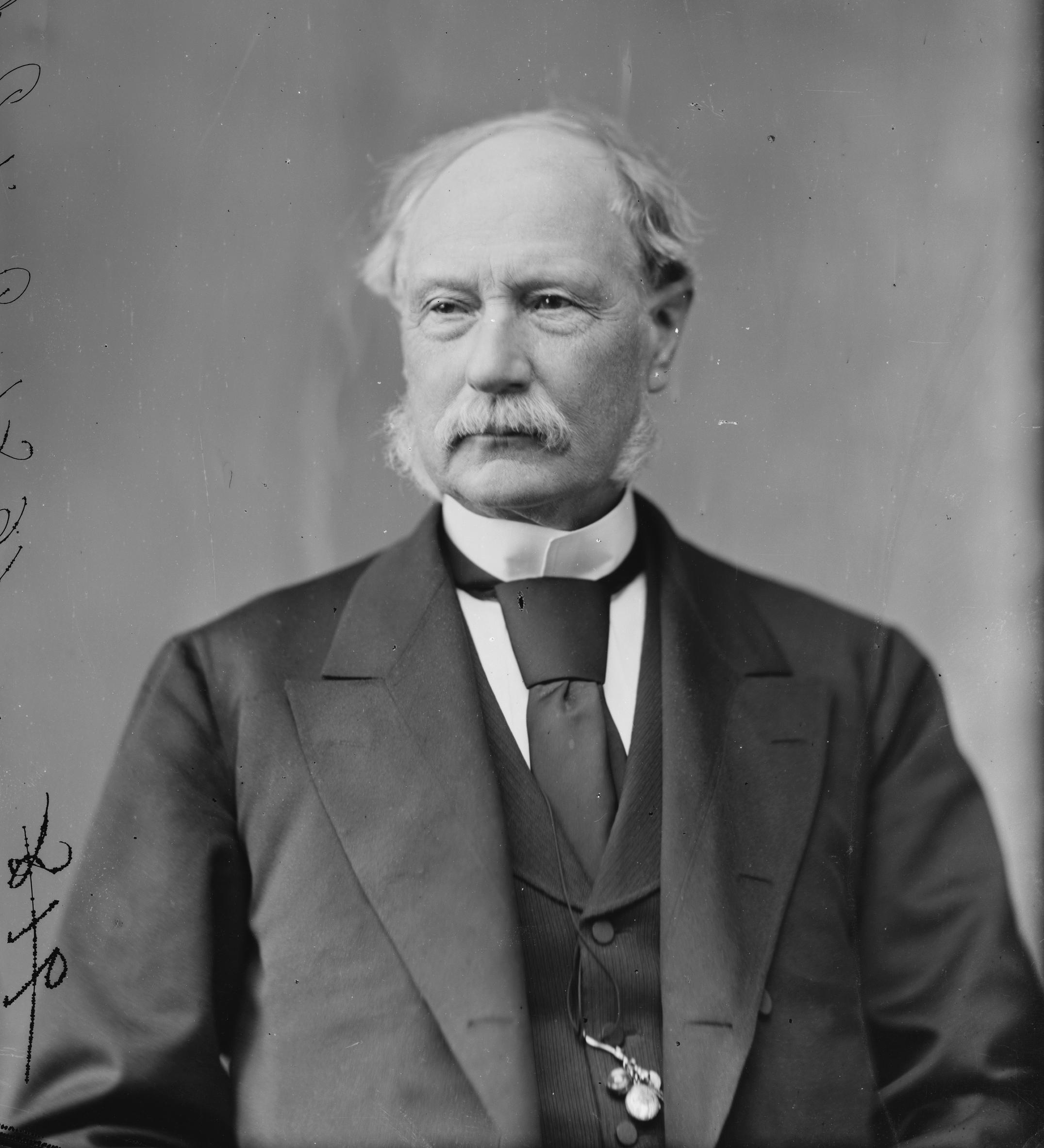
- Field, 1865–1880

Member of the U.S. House of Representatives from New York's 7th district
- In office January 11, 1877 – March 3, 1877
- Preceded by: Smith Ely Jr.
- Succeeded by: Anthony Eickhoff

Personal details
- Born: David Dudley Field II; February 13, 1805 Haddam, Connecticut, U.S.
- Died: April 13, 1894 (aged 89) New York City, U.S.
- Resting place: Stockbridge Cemetery in Stockbridge, Massachusetts
- Party: Democratic
- Spouses: Jane Lucinda Hopkins (m. 1829; died 1836) Harriet Davidson (died 1864) Mary E. Carr (died 1874)
- Children: 3, including Lucinda Musgrave
- Education: Williams College (AB)

David Dudley Field II (February 13, 1805 – April 13, 1894) was an American lawyer and law reformer who made major contributions to the development of American civil procedure. His greatest accomplishment was engineering the move away from common law pleading towards code pleading, which culminated in the enactment of the Field Code in 1850 by the state of New York.

In 1877, he also served briefly as a U.S. representative from New York's 7th congressional district.

== Early life and education ==
Field was born in Haddam, Connecticut on February 13, 1805. He was the oldest of the eight sons and two daughters of the Rev. David Dudley Field I, a Congregational minister and local historian, and Submit Dickenson Field. His brothers included Stephen Johnson Field, a U.S. Supreme Court Justice, Cyrus Field, a prominent businessman and creator of the Atlantic Cable, and Rev. Henry Martyn Field, a prominent clergyman and travel writer. He was also the uncle of U.S. Supreme Court Justice David Josiah Brewer.

He graduated from Williams College in 1825, studied law with Harmanus Bleecker in Albany, and settled in New York City. After his admission to the bar in 1828, he rapidly won a high position in his profession. He joined the law office of Henry and Robert Sedgwick, of the prominent Sedgwick family, and became a partner in the firm after Robert died.

In 1829, Field married Jane Lucinda Hopkins, with whom he had three children: Dudley, Jeanie Lucinda, and Isabella. After his wife's death in 1836, Field remarried twice, first to Harriet Davidson (d. 1864) and second to Mary E. Carr (d. 1874). The eldest child, Dudley Field, followed in his father's footsteps and studied law. He was made a partner in his father's practice in 1854. Jeanie Lucinda married an Antigua-born British imperial civil servant, Anthony Musgrave, and became a promoter of charitable projects in British colonies.

== Dedication to codification ==
After having practiced law for several years, Field became convinced that the common law in America, and particularly in New York state, needed radical changes to unify and simplify its procedure. 1836 was particularly devastating for Field: his first wife, youngest child, and one of his brothers all died in the same year. To cope with his grief, he paused his law practice, traveled to Europe for over a year and focused on investigating the courts, procedure, and codes of England, France and other countries. He then returned to the United States and labored to bring about a codification of its common law procedure. Upon returning, he also established his own law firm, in which he was joined by his brothers Stephen and Jonathan.

Much of Field's ideas on codification and the civil procedure rules were based on the 1825 Louisiana Code of Procedure. The Louisiana code was drafted by jurists including Edward Livingston, Louis Lislet (1762–1832), and Pierre Derbigny. In turn, the Louisiana code was inspired by French (including the French Code of Civil Procedure of 1806), Spanish, and Roman law, the common law tradition, and Livingston's Louisiana Practice Act of 1805. European civil law thus influenced American civil procedure, partially through the intermediary of Louisiana.

Livingston helped to prepare criminal and civil codes for Louisiana, and Field's personal papers at Duke University Libraries reveal that he had read Livingston's 1825 report on the Louisiana Civil Code. Field was also influenced by criticism of the common law by his law partner Henry Sedgwick, as well as lawyer William Sampson.

Field devoted more than 40 years of his life to codification, and he "was by far the most persuasive and articulate advocate of codification in nineteenth-century America." He began by outlining his proposed reforms in pamphlets, professional journal articles, and legislative testimony, but met with a discouraging lack of interest. In 1846, Field's ideas gained wider notice with publication of a pamphlet, "The Reorganization of the Judiciary", which influenced that year's New York State Constitutional Convention to report in favor of a codification of the laws. In 1847 he finally had a chance to put his ideas into official form when he was appointed head of a state commission to revise court procedure and practice. The first part of the commission's work, a portion of the code of civil procedure, was reported and enacted by the legislature in 1848. By January 1, 1850, the New York state legislature had enacted the complete Code of Civil Procedure, subsequently known as the Field Code since it was almost entirely Field's work.

The new system abolished the distinction in forms of procedure between an action at law (a civil case demanding monetary damages) and a suit in equity (a civil case demanding non-monetary damages). Under the new procedure, rather than having to file separate actions, a plaintiff needed to file only one civil action (or as it is often called today, a lawsuit). Eventually Field's civil procedure code was, with some changes, adopted in 27 states. It also influenced later procedural reforms in England and several of her colonies (specifically, the Judicature Acts).

However, according to Amalia Kessler, the more important aspect of Field's "code of civil procedure" was not so much the "code" part, but the "civil procedure" part. Before Field, the idea of "procedure" as a unified body of law simply did not exist in common law jurisdictions. Joseph Story's treatises a generation earlier are a typical example, in that Story, like his contemporaries, treated "pleading" and "practice" as two clearly distinct bodies of law and never used the word "procedure". The Field Code joined together "pleading" and "practice" for the first time under the heading of "procedure" and marked the "invention of procedure as a distinct, coherent category, defined in antithesis to the substantive law".

In Field's new civil procedure system, allowing self-interested or otherwise flawed testimony "was preferable to excluding evidence that might have some truth value", and thus the Field Code took an expansive approach to the admissibility of evidence, in contrast to the common law's tightly restricted rules. The Field Code allowed any person "having organs of sense" to testify as a witness in a court of law in New York, except "the insane and very young children". Field's progressive and relatively race-neutral views did not prevail elsewhere; fifteen states excluded testimony from persons of various races when they adopted the Field Code.

In 1857, Field became chair of another state commission, this time for the systematic codification of all of New York state law except for those portions already reported upon by the Commissioner of Practice and Pleadings. In this work he personally prepared almost the whole of the political and civil codes. The commission's penal code is often misattributed to Field but it was actually drafted by William Curtis Noyes, another member of the code commission who was a former prosecutor.

The codification, which was completed in February 1865, was adopted only in small part by the state of New York, but it served as a model upon which many statutory codes throughout the United States were constructed. For example, although Field's civil code was repeatedly rejected by his home state of New York (due in large part to the opposition of James C. Carter to Field's ideas), it was later adopted in large part by the states of California, Idaho, Montana, North Dakota, and South Dakota, as well as the territory of Guam many years later. (Notably, Idaho largely enacted the contract sections of Field's civil code but declined to enact the tort sections.) 18 states ultimately enacted part or all of what was widely (though incorrectly) called Field's penal code, including his home state of New York in 1881. Thanks to Field's brother, Stephen (who served in the California State Assembly and as California's fifth Chief Justice before being appointed to the U.S. Supreme Court), California bought into Field's codification project more than any other state. California first enacted a Practice Act in 1851 influenced by the Field Code, then in 1872 enacted Field's civil procedure, criminal procedure, civil, penal, and political codes as the first four California Codes (California merged Field's penal and criminal procedure codes into a single code).

Meanwhile, in 1866, Field proposed to the British National Association for the Promotion of Social Science a revision and codification of the laws of all nations. For an international commission of lawyers he prepared Draft Outlines of an International Code (1872), the submission of which resulted in the organization of the international Association for the Reform and Codification of the Laws of Nations, of which he became president.

== Politics ==
Field was originally an anti-slavery Democrat, and he supported Martin Van Buren in the Free Soil campaign of 1848. He gave his support to the Republican Party in 1856 and to the Lincoln Administration throughout the American Civil War.

=== Defense of William M. Tweed ===
Field was part of the team of defense counsel that William M. Tweed assembled to defend himself during the first criminal prosecution of Tweed in 1873. Other members of the defense team included John Graham and Elihu Root. This first trial ended when the jury could not agree on a verdict. In a second trial in November 1873, Tweed received a sentence of twelve years in prison and a $12,750 fine from judge Noah Davis.

=== Later career ===
After 1876, Field returned to the Democratic Party, and from January to March 1877 served in the United States House of Representatives to complete the unexpired term of Smith Ely, who had been elected Mayor of New York City. During his brief Congressional career he delivered six speeches (all of which attracted attention), introduced a bill in regard to the presidential succession, and appeared before the Electoral Commission in Samuel J. Tilden's interest during the highly controversial presidential election of 1876. He died in New York City in 1894.

== Death ==
He died in New York City on April 13, 1894 at the age of 89. His remains were interred in Stockbridge Cemetery in Stockbridge, Massachusetts.

== Works ==
- Some of his numerous pamphlets and addresses were collected in his Speeches, Arguments and Miscellaneous Papers (3 vols., 1884–1890).
- See also the Life of David Dudley Field (New York, 1898), by Rev. Henry Martyn Field.
- Gabor Hamza, Le développement du droit privé européen (Budapest, 2005) 178 ss. pp.
- Gabor Hamza, Entstehung und Entwicklung der modernen Privatrechtsordnungen und die römischrechtliche Tradition (Budapest 2009) 619 sq. pp.

== See also ==
- Young America Movement
- Hundred of Dudley
- Anthony Musgrave

== Sources ==
- United States Congress. "David Dudley Field II (id: F000104)". Biographical Directory of the United States Congress.

U.S. House of Representatives
Preceded by Smith Ely, Jr.	Member of the U.S. House of Representatives from New York's 7th congressional district January 1877 – March 1877	Succeeded by Anthony Eickhoff
