= Charles de Choiseul, Duke of Praslin =

French nobleman and politician (1805–1847)

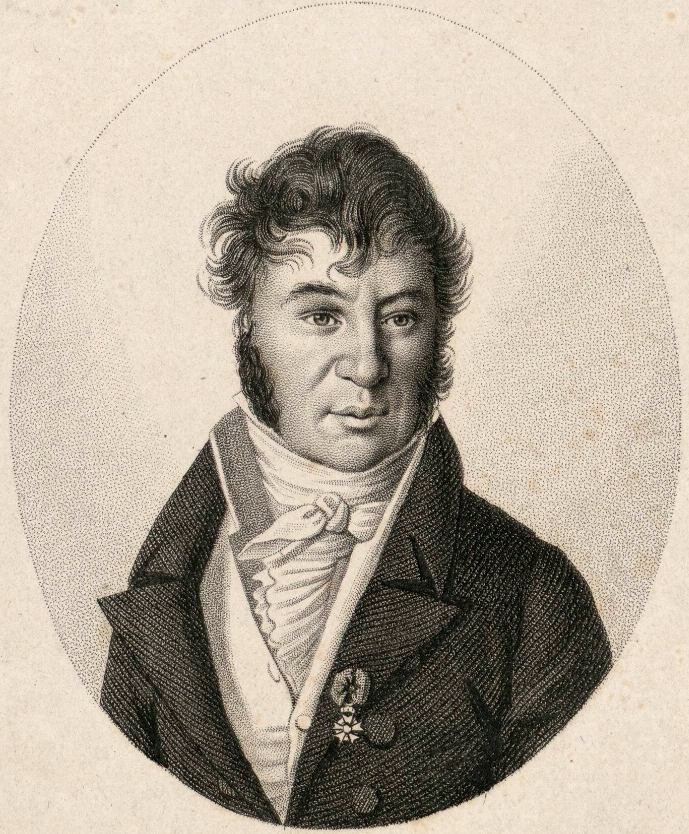

Charles de Choiseul, Duke of Praslin (Charles Laure Hugues Théobald; 29 June 1805 – 24 August 1847) was a French nobleman and politician, who served as a member of the Chamber of Deputies in 1838–1842. Choiseul-Praslin's suicide, occurring while he faced trial for the murder of his wife, the Duchess de Choiseul-Praslin (née Fanny Sébastiani), caused a scandal which in turn contributed to the outbreak of the 1848 Revolution and the fall of the July Monarchy.

== Biography ==
Born in Paris, he was the eldest son of Charles Raynart Laure Félix, duc de Choiseul, who had been a deputy and leader of the National Guard under the First French Empire, and his wife (née de Breteuil); the couple also had another son, Edgar Laure Charles Gilbert, and three daughters.

He became a member of the Chamber for the department of Seine-et-Marne, and was later a chevalier d'honneur to Hélène, wife of Ferdinand Philippe, Duke of Orléans. A duke since 1841, Choiseul-Praslin was created a Peer of France on 6 April 1845.

On 18 October 1824, Choiseul-Praslin married Fanny Altarice Rosalba, the daughter of Marshal Horace Sébastiani de La Porta and his first wife Fanny Franquetot de Coigny. Fanny reportedly had a passionate love for her husband, which was recorded in her correspondence. The couple resided at the Choiseul estate in Vaux-le-Vicomte, and had ten children together.

While traveling from Vaux-le-Vicomte to Dieppe, the Choiseul-Praslin family spent the night of 17 August 1847 at its residence in Paris' Faubourg Saint-Honoré. At five o'clock in the morning, servants were alerted by noises coming from the duchess' room, and discovered that she had been brutally attacked, and had struggled with the assailant while being prevented from screaming. She had been hit with a blunt object, then repeatedly stabbed; she died soon after staff rushed in to provide assistance. The duke was the last person to answer calls by the household staff, and raised suspicion almost immediately because, despite the uproar, the windows of his room had remained shut.

During searches in rooms adjacent to the duke's, police uncovered the blood-stained handle of a dagger (kept inside in a cabinet), a bathrobe partly washed but still stained with blood, as well as a leather sheath and various items of clothing and paper (all thrown inside a chimney and half-consumed by flames). A more extensive search for the dagger's blade produced no result. It was also found out that the duke was keeping a loaded pistol by his side. The theory on which police subsequently relied was that Choiseul-Praslin had intended to shoot Fanny, but had then realized that this would cause alarm. In his defense, the duke stated that he had attempted to defend his wife from an unknown assassin, but he could not indicate how the latter had escaped. A servant later alleged that, upon entering the duke's room to announce to him the death of his wife, he found him washing his hands, and claimed that this was done to remove blood. A small blood stain was found inside a washing basin, and it was documented that Choiseul-Praslin's body displayed bitemarks and scratches.

In previous years, the Choiseul-Praslin household had been the scene of violent confrontations between the duke and his wife. Among other things, Fanny de Choiseul-Praslin had accused her husband of hiring a governess, Henriette Deluzy-Desportes (also Henriette Deluzy), in order to estrange her from her children. Fanny had fired Deluzy-Desportes six weeks before her murder and the governess had left the household. Fanny had accused Deluzy-Desportes of being the duke's mistress and suspected that the governess and the Duke planned to run away together. The duchess repeatedly threatened to separate from her husband because of the alleged affair.

After being held under house arrest, the duke was transferred to the Luxembourg Palace pending trial by the Court of Peers (which was called upon by royal ordinance and reserved judgment for members of the nobility). The court was to be presided over by Étienne-Denis Pasquier. On 18 August 1847, while in custody, he poisoned himself during a moment when guards were neglecting their duty, allegedly swallowing a large dose of what has been described as laudanum or arsenic acid. In agony, he refused to answer questions, and also refused to eat. Nevertheless, he denied all accusations one final time before dying.

The trial was annulled due to the defendant's death, and a judicial action brought against the governess was dismissed in mid-November of the same year. In conjunction with this, a controversy arose over the authorities' alleged corruption and the common perception that Peerage went against the equality of treatment in justice; it was speculated that the Peers had allowed Choiseul-Praslin to commit suicide, or even poisoned him, as a means to avoid an uncomfortable verdict for one of their own.

A few months previously, French society had been shocked by the aristocratic Teste–Cubières political corruption scandal revealed in May 1847, and the affair of the duke and duchess only added to the popular discontent with the July Monarchy which culminated in the French Revolution of 1848.

== Legacy ==
A persistent and popular rumor indicated that Choiseul-Praslin's death had been faked, and he had been allowed to leave the country, with many claiming that he lived the rest of his life in England. According to Nicaraguan researcher Eddy Kühl, Choiseul-Praslin survived and made his way to Matagalpa, where he fathered two sons, known locally as Jorge and Benjamín, and three daughters; Margarita, Eva and Gertrudis. According to this theory, the duke died in 1882 and was buried in Ciudad Darío. Kühl's investigation, first published in 2000, reportedly raised interest from the Choiseul-Praslin descendants living in France, who are said to have made known their wish to meet with the Nicaraguan claimants.

Escalating conflicts in a troubled period, the affair contributed to the outbreak of the 1848 Revolution, which occurred six months after the suicide. Following the establishment of the Second Republic, all documents regarding procedures in the case, together with all other acts of the Chamber of Peers, were sent to the National Archives.

After Deluzy-Desportes was freed, she left France for America and married Henry M. Field. In 1938, Henry's great-niece Rachel Field published a novel based on the killing, All This and Heaven Too. The novel became a 1940 film of the same name starring Charles Boyer as the Duc, Barbara O'Neil as the Duchess, Montagu Love as Horace Sébastiani, and Bette Davis as Henriette Deluzy-Desportes.

The affair was also the basis for a historical novel by the English writer Marjorie Bowen called Forget-Me-Not, although the characters' names are changed. It also inspired a play by Shaun McKenna, titled Ruling Passions, which premiered at the Royal Theatre (Northampton) in 1995. In 2018, Nicaraguan novelist Gioconda Belli published Las fiebres de la memoria (2018), following the theory of Choiseul's life in Nicaragua.
