= Félix Desportes =

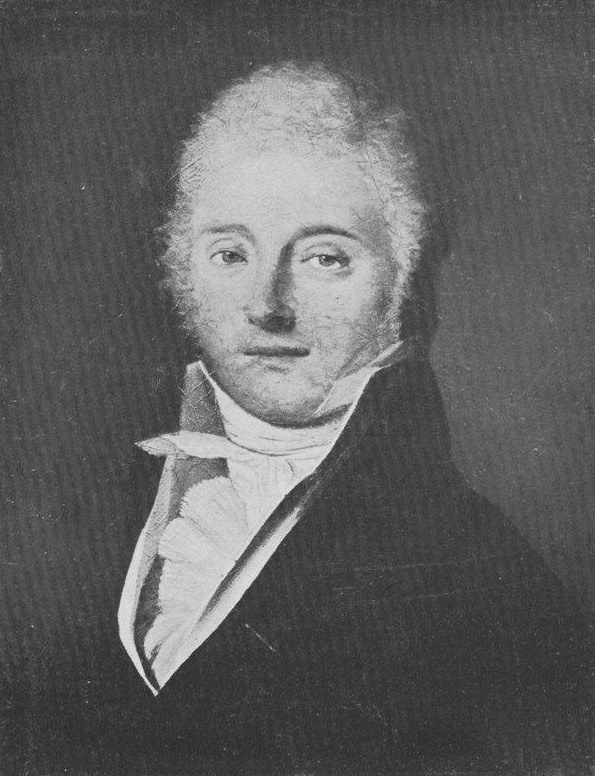
Johann Stephan Decker, Félix Desportes, September 1818

Félix Desportes (August 5, 1763 – August 28, 1849) was the first mayor of Montmartre, secretary to Lucien Bonaparte, and Prefect of Haut-Rhin.

He ensured diplomatic missions for the various regimes resulting from the French Revolution and played a decisive role during the reuniting of Geneva with France. Under the consulate and then the French Empire, he was appointed Prefect of Haut-Rhin and received the title of Baron. Elected member of the House of Representatives during the Hundred Days, where he sat among the liberals, he had to go into exile after the Second Restoration. Back in France, he gave up his political career after 1830.

He was the grandfather of Henriette Deluzy-Desportes, a governess who was embroiled in a murder-suicide scandal.

== Early life ==
Nicholas Félix Desportes, born August 5, 1763, in Rouen, was the son of a wealthy merchant, Jacques-Félix Desportes and related to poet Philippe Desportes (1546–1606), his grand uncle. He attended the military school of Gonesse and he studied law at the college of Lisieux in Paris. He also trained as a Parisian notary.

== Career ==
On May 22, 1790, during the French Revolution, he became the first mayor of Montmatre. Beginning in 1791, he carried out diplomatic missions in the Swiss canton.

He was a protégé of Georges Jacques Danton. During the Reign of Terror, he was arrested on April 23, 1794, and was saved by the coup d'état of the Thermidorian Reaction. He lived in Geneva when he was recalled on September 12, 1795, and dismissed on January 25, 1796. The French annexation policy led to the fall of the Republic of Geneva. He was the commissioner general in the department of Léman from May to August 1798.

In 1800, he became the secretary general of the Ministry of the Interior under Lucien Bonaparte, who was a good friend. From April 3 to October 20, 1800, he was the first secretary of the French embassy in Spain. Both Bonaparte and Desportes benefited from the Treaty of Badajoz (1801).

Lucien was exiled following a quarrel with his brother Napoleon, who sent Desportes to a prefecture. On July 8, 1802, he became the prefect of Haut-Rhin, a position he held for thirteen years. He was made a baron of the Empire on February 25, 1809, and he became a member of the Legion of Honour. He was identified as an embezzler and removed from his position on December 12, 1812, and was formally dismissed on March 12, 1813.

He had become wealthy from his properties in Pulversheim, Haut-Rhin and hotel in Paris. He was the squadron leader and then lieutenant-colonel of the National Guard in Paris. He served as the aide-de-camp to the general-in-chief of the guard. On July 15, 1814, he received Benjamin Constant. He was elected to the French Government of the Hundred Days on May 13, 1815. During the Second Restoration he was arrested on August 1, 1815. He was imprisoned at Petits-Pères, then at Plessis and had been identified as one of the conspiracists for the guillotine. With François-Marie, marquis de Barthélemy, he helped negotiate Peace of Basel.

He was ordered to relinquish his properties in Haut-Rhin and was banished from the area. From 1816 to 1820, he sought refuge in German cities of Landau, Mainz, Wiesbaden, Frankfurt, and Hesse-Darmstadt in the Grand Duchy of Hesse.

In 1820, he was allowed to return to France, where he addressed his prefectural conduct at Haut-Rhin. Along with Jacques Koechlin and Voyer d'Argenson, they were "coryphées of the liberal party".

From 1825 to 1834, he lived according to his revolutionary principles, sought public office, and in 1827, attended a liberal banquet in Colmar. He was ostracized, though, by the Bourbons for his efforts during the Revolution and was kept out of public functions.

== Personal life ==
He married Victoire Berryer (1772–1857) in the church of Saint-Gervais on May 5, 1788. A rich heiress, she was "considered the greatest beauty in Paris." She was a Spanish woman, who was amiable and pretty, but inconsistent. He was fickle. The Desportes did not have a happy marriage. At first, the couple lived in Montmarte. Later, while Desportes lived in Colmar in Haut-Rhin, Mme Desportes lived in Paris. They had four children: Lucile; Flore-Pierrette de Montmartre (born May 3, 1791); Louis-Benjamin-Félix (born October 1792) and Victor (born June 19, 1794). Flore-Pierrette married Baron de Boucheporn, who was the Marshal of the Court of the King of Westphalia. Victor studied at the University of Gœttingue.

Lucile, neglected by her father, lived near her mother. She was concerned that her chance to marry would pass her by and she wanted to stop caring for her mother. Lucile fell in love with an officer in 1812 and became pregnant. Desportes did not approve of the marriage and rejected her pleas to be allowed to marry him, before he was killed. Henriette Deluzy-Desportes was born on June 1, 1813, on the rue de la Pépinière in Paris. Her birth was recorded with just her given name Henrietta with no surname and no parents. Lucile did not recognize Henriette for ten years. Desportes refused to admit she was her granddaughter. He provides a 3,000 franc pension to Lucile. Lucile worked to earn money for Henriette's education. She became an apprentice to an engraver and studied under a painter. Lucile died of cholera in 1832, and initially the girl was taken in by Felix's brother Benjamin Desportes. She received 1,500 francs to finish her education and went to Brixton Hill to learn to speak English. She was a governess for the Praslin family, which resulted in the death of the duchess, suicide by the duke, and three months that she spent being interrogated until they let her go for lack of evidence.

Beginning in 1830, he lost much of his fortune. A notary ran away with a large part of his fortune. A trading house in Rouen that managed a number of investments went bankrupt. He could no longer support Lucile consistently and he leveraged relationships to obtain a prefect retirement pension, which he began receiving in 1834. He died on August 28, 1849, in Montmartre, Paris. He and his brother Benjamin are buried at the Calvaire Cemetery in Montmartre.
