= All This, and Heaven Too =

1940 film by Anatole Litvak

- Theatrical release poster
- Directed by: Anatole Litvak
- Screenplay by: Casey Robinson
- Based on: novel by Rachel Field
- Produced by: Hal B. Wallis (executive producer); David Lewis (associate producer)
- Starring: Bette Davis; Charles Boyer; Jeffrey Lynn; Barbara O'Neil; Virginia Weidler; Henry Daniell; Walter Hampden; George Coulouris
- Cinematography: Ernie Haller, A.S.C.
- Edited by: Warren Low
- Music by: Max Steiner
- Production companies: Warner Bros.-First National Pictures; Anatole Litvak Productions
- Distributed by: Warner Bros. Pictures
- Release date: July 4, 1940
- Running time: 141 minutes
- Country: United States
- Language: English

All This, and Heaven Too is a 1940 American drama film released by Warner Bros.-First National Pictures, produced and directed by Anatole Litvak with Hal B. Wallis as executive producer. The screenplay was adapted by Casey Robinson from the 1938 novel by Rachel Field. The music was by Max Steiner and the cinematography by Ernie Haller. The film stars Bette Davis and Charles Boyer with Jeffrey Lynn, Barbara O'Neil, Virginia Weidler, Helen Westley, Walter Hampden, Henry Daniell, Harry Davenport, George Coulouris and Montagu Love.

Field's novel is based on the true story of her great-aunt Henriette Deluzy-Desportes, a French governess who fell in love with the Duc de Praslin, her employer. When Praslin's wife was murdered, Deluzy-Desportes was implicated. The scandal contributed to the political turmoil before the French Revolution of 1848 that deposed King Louis Philippe I.

== Plot ==
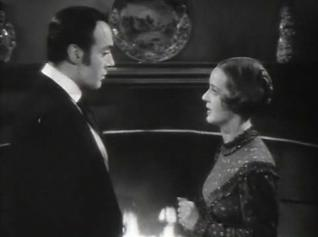
Screenshot of Charles Boyer and Bette Davis from the film's original trailer

Mademoiselle Henriette Deluzy-Desportes, a French woman, starts teaching at an American girls school. She is confronted by the tales and gossip about her that circulate among her pupils and, thus provoked, she decides to tell them her life story.

Deluzy-Desportes is governess to the four children of the Duc and Duchesse de Praslin in Paris during the last years of the Orleans monarchy. As a result of the Duchesse's constantly erratic and temperamental behavior, all that remains is an unhappy marriage, but the Duc remains with his wife for the sake of their children.

Deluzy-Desportes, with her warmth and kindness, wins the love and affection of the children and their father, but also the jealousy and hatred of their mother. She is forced to leave and the Duchess refuses to give her a letter of recommendation to future employers. The Duc confronts his wife and she invents alternative letters taking opposite attitudes, which in fact she has not written and does not intend to write. Her account enrages him and, at the breaking point, he kills her.

The Duc de Praslin is in a privileged position; as a peer his case can only be heard by other nobles. He refuses to confess his guilt or openly to admit his love for his employee, knowing that his fellow nobles wish to use such an admission to blame her for the murder by declaring that he was acting at her bidding. Ultimately the Duc takes poison to prevent himself from ever publicly proclaiming his love for Henriette, since he knows that would convict her; however, he lives long enough to reveal it to another of his servants, Pierre, a kindly old man who had warned the governess to leave the de Praslin household. With the Duc's death, the authorities accept that they have no evidence upon which to base a judgment that Henriette solicited the murder and she is released from the Conciergerie.

Deluzy-Desportes had been recommended for a teaching position in the United States by an American minister, Rev. Henry Field, to whom she had expressed a loss of faith while in prison. He proposes marriage, and it is implied that Henriette will accept.

== Cast ==
- Bette Davis as Henriette Deluzy-Desportes
- Charles Boyer as Duc de Praslin
- Jeffrey Lynn as Henry Martyn Field
- Barbara O'Neil as Duchesse de Praslin
- Virginia Weidler as Louise
- Helen Westley as Madame LeMaire
- Walter Hampden as Pasquier
- Henry Daniell as Broussais
- Harry Davenport as Pierre
- George Coulouris as Charpentier
- Montagu Love as Marechal Sebastiani
- Janet Beecher as Miss Haines
- June Lockhart as Isabelle
- Ann Todd as Berthe
- Richard Nichols as Raynald
- Fritz Leiber as Abbe Gallard
- Ian Keith as DeLangle
- Sibyl Harris as Mlle. Maillard
- Edward Fielding as Dr. Louis
- Mary Anderson as Rebecca Jay
- Ann Gillis as Emily Schuyler
- Peggy Stewart as Helen Lexington
- Victor Kilian as Gendarme
- Mrs. Gardner Crane as Madame Gauthier

== Production ==
Producer David Lewis wrote "What appealed to me strongly about All This, and Heaven Too was that it was the story of a great and totally unconsummated love affair. Usually, I believe that a love Story should be consummated early and then go on from there. In fact, in All This, and Heaven Too the tease was almost unbearable. It portrayed two vital human beings desperately in love with each other and never even touching."

Lewis claimed he persuaded Hal Wallis to buy the rights to the novel and Warners paid $50,000. Casey Robinson, who had just made Dark Victory with Lewis, wrote the script.

According to Lewis, Davis was reluctant to play the lead and wanted to play the Duchess. However she changed her mind. Boyer was paid $100,000 for the role.

Judith Anderson was to play the Duchese but she then accepted an MGM contract so Barbara O'Neill played it instead.

== Reception ==
The film was positively reviewed by critics. When the film premiered at Radio City Music Hall, Bosley Crowther of The New York Times wrote that filmgoers willing to sit through the long running time "will find the film a source of much emotional satisfaction; others of less Spartan stamp will certainly protest that it wears out their patience in the telling of a comparatively uncomplicated tale. For the Warners are here handing out a tear-laden old-fashioned drama—and a very heavy one, too."

Variety called it "film theatre at its best...Casey Robinson in the scripting captured the quaintness of the manners and customs of Paris, in 1848, and succeeded admirably in retaining both spirit and characters of the novel, despite the necessity for much deletion of material." Film Daily's headline announced: "Dramatically powerful, beautifully mounted and superbly cast; film should be one of year's strongest box-office attractions." Harrison's Reports wrote: "A powerful drama, with a strong appeal for women. The production is lavish, and the direction and performances are of the highest order." John Mosher of The New Yorker wrote that Litvak had swung the viewer into the historical setting "with all the romantic, profuse gusto at his command. I think a few of the scenes of governess and children might have been elided, for, with the sinister doings in the background, we can't forever sustain a nursery mood. In general, though, the long picture seems short, which, of course, is something very much in its favor."

The film was placed fifth on Film Daily's year-end nationwide poll of 546 critics naming the best films of 1940. It is considered to be a successful but expensive costume drama.

The movie was not as commercially successful as Dark Victory.

== Accolades ==
Award	Category	Nominee(s)	Result	Ref.
Academy Awards	Outstanding Production	Jack L. Warner, Hal B. Wallis, and David Lewis (for Warner Bros.)	Nominated	
Academy Awards	Best Supporting Actress	Barbara O'Neil	Nominated	
Academy Awards	Best Cinematography – Black and White	Ernest Haller	Nominated	

== Home media ==
On April 1, 2008, Warner Home Video released the film as part of the box set The Bette Davis Collection, Volume 3.

== Notes ==
- Lewis, David (1993). Curtis, James (ed.). The Creative Producer. Metuchen: Scarecrow Press. ISBN 0-8108-2720-4.
