= Henry Martyn Field (minister) =

American author and clergyman (1822–1907)

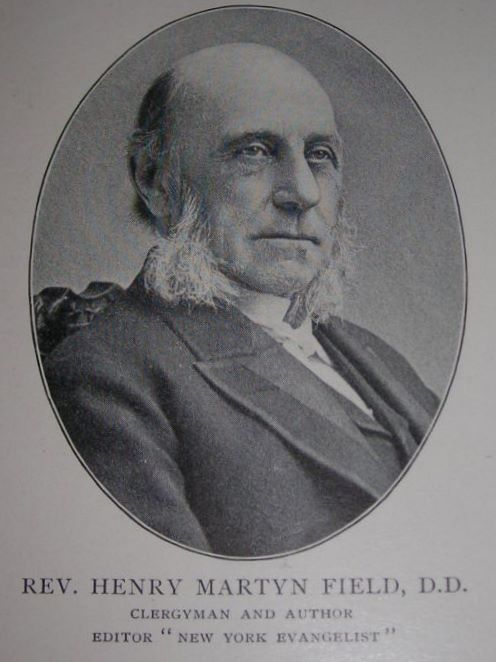
- Born: August 3, 1822; Stockbridge, Massachusetts
- Died: January 26, 1907 (aged 84); Stockbridge, Massachusetts
- Occupations: Minister, author, editor
- Spouse(s): Henriette Deluzy-Desportes (1851–1875, her death); Frances E. Dwight (1876–1907, his death)
- Parent: David Dudley Field I
- Relatives: Cyrus West Field, David Dudley Field II, and Stephen Johnson Field (brothers)

Henry Martyn Field (April 3, 1822 – January 26, 1907) was an American author and clergyman. He was the publisher and editor of The Evangelist for 44 years. He traveled extensively and his travel books were unusually popular.

Field married Henriette Deluzy-Desportes, a former governess who has been named in the murder-suicide of the Praslin family of Paris. She left Europe for New York City and Field and Desportes were married.

== Early life ==
Brother of Cyrus West Field, David Dudley Field II, and Stephen Johnson Field, Henry Martyn Field was born at Stockbridge, Massachusetts on April 3, 1822. The eighth of nine children, he was son of David Dudley Field I, a minister from Madison, Connecticut, and Submit Dickinson Field.

He entered Williams College at the age of 12, and graduated in 1838, at the age of 16. He then studied theology for four years at East Windsor, Connecticut and one year at New Haven, Connecticut.

== Career ==
He was pastor of a Presbyterian church in St Louis, Missouri, from 1842 to 1847, and of a Congregational church in West Springfield, Massachusetts, from 1850 to 1854. The interval between his two pastorates he spent in Europe, during the French Revolution of 1848 and the Revolutions of 1848 in the Italian states, after which he wrote about the revolutions and The Good and the End in the Roman Catholic Church.

From 1854 to 1898, he was editor and for many years he was also sole proprietor of The Evangelist, a New York periodical devoted to the interests of the Presbyterian church.

He traveled extensively over the course of his life, after which he wrote books about the places that he visited. He was the author of a series of books of travel, which achieved unusual popularity. His two volumes descriptive of a trip round the world in 1875–1876, entitled From the Lakes of Killarney to the Golden Horn (1876) and From Egypt to Japan (1877), are almost classic in their way, and have passed through more than twenty editions. Among his other publications are The Irish Confederates and the Rebellion of 1798 (1850), The History of the Atlantic Telegraph (1866), Faith or Agnosticism? the Field-Ingersoll Discussion (1888), On the Desert – Recent Events in Egypt (1888), Old Spain and New Spain (1888), Bright Skies and Dark Shadows (1890), and Life of David Dudley Field (1898). Writing about race in Bright Skies and Dark Shadows, Field claimed that segregation was part of human instinct which could not be overcome through legislation.

== Personal life ==
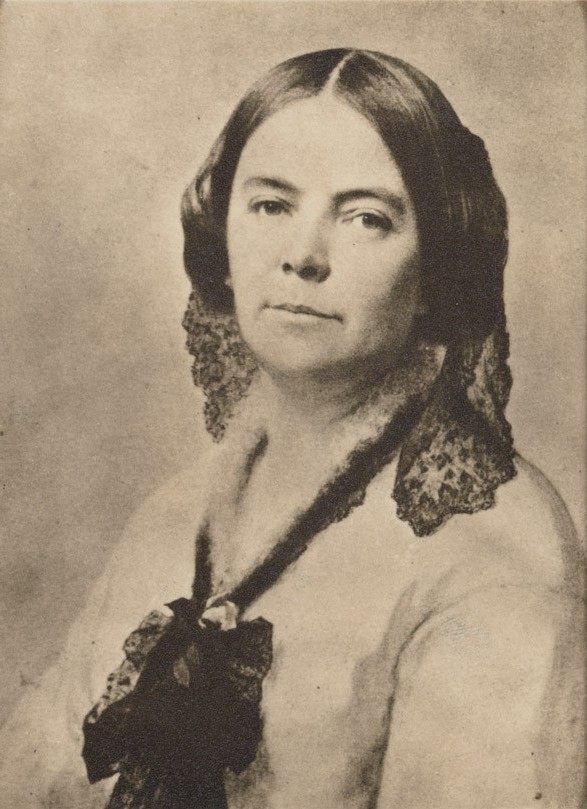
Henriette Desportes Field

Field married Mlle. Henriette Deluzy-Desportes, the one-time governess to the ill-fated Charles de Choiseul-Praslin, Duc de Praslin whose murder of his wife Fanny (daughter of Marshal Horace Sebastiani) and apparent suicide help set off the events leading to the overthrow of King Louis Philippe I's reign in 1848. The marriage of Henry and Henrietta was a successful one.

While living in Gramercy Park, New York City, the Fields entertained a large group of friends who were eminent in art and literature, like Eastman Johnson. Samuel Morse, Harriet Beecher Stowe, Fanny Kemble, and William Cullen Bryant regularly attended their salon in Gramercy Park.

Henrietta died in 1875 in New York City. He went on a tour around the world for 15 months. Upon his return, he married Miss Frances E. Dwight in Stockbridge at his country home, Windmore-on-the-Hill. He spent the last years of his life in retirement at Stockbridge, where he wrote biographies about his brothers. He died at his home there on January 26, 1907.

== Popular culture ==
Henry Martyn Field was portrayed by actor Jeffrey Lynn in the 1940 film of All This and Heaven Too, based on the novel by Field's collateral descendant Rachel Field.
