= Horace François Bastien Sébastiani de La Porta =

French soldier, diplomat, and politician (1771–1851)

Horace Sébastiani
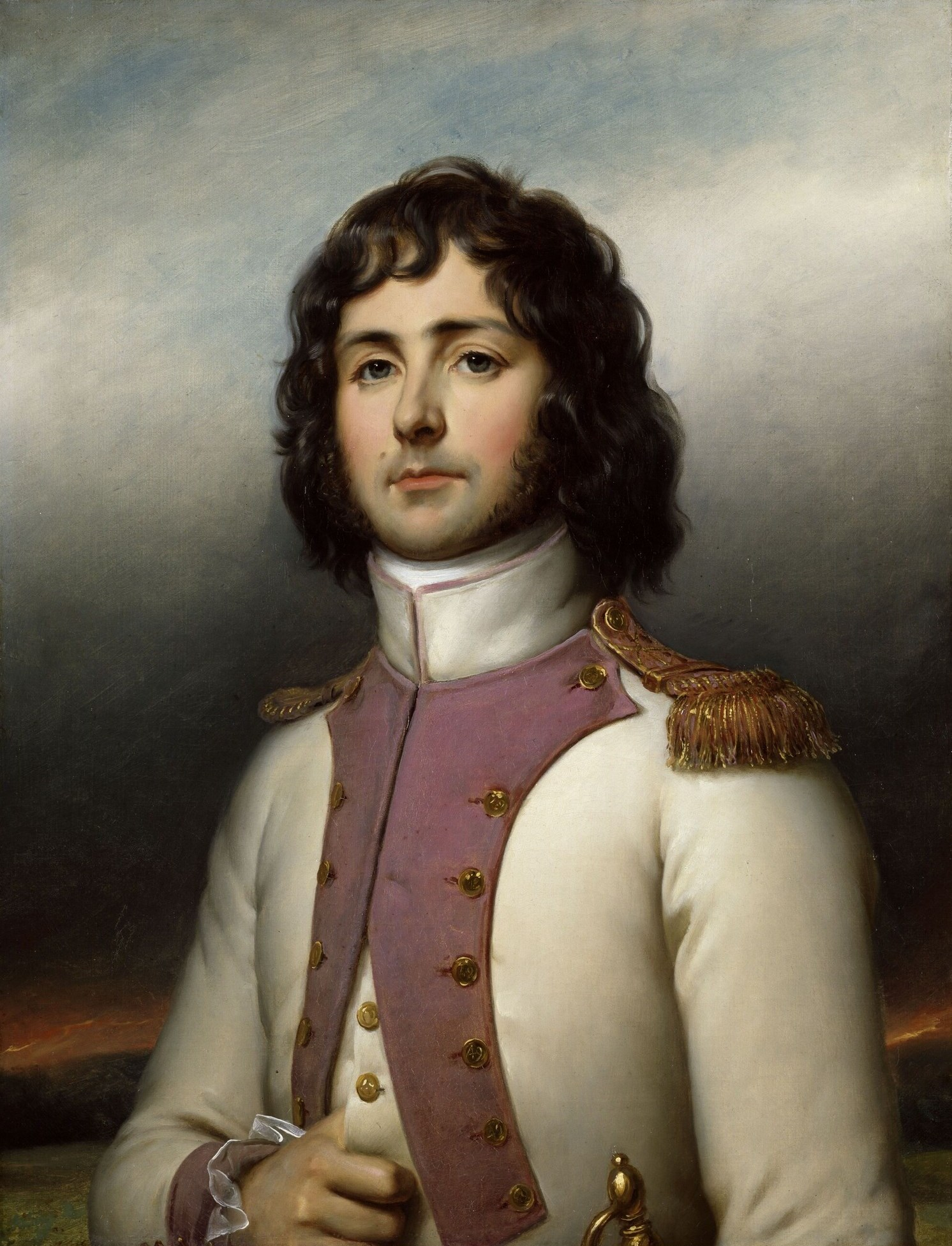
- Sebastiani as a Leutnant of the light infantry in 1793, by Jean-Baptiste Paulin Guérin, (1835)

French Minister of Foreign Affairs
- In office 17 October 1830 – 11 October 1832
- Preceded by: Nicolas Joseph Maison
- Succeeded by: Victor, 3rd duc de Broglie

Personal details
- Born: 11 November 1771 La Porta, Corsica, France
- Died: 20 July 1851 (aged 79) Paris, France
- Spouse(s): Fanny Franquetot de Coigny (d. 1807); Aglaé de Gramont
- Children: Francoise, Duchess de Praslin
- Occupation: Soldier; diplomat
- Awards: See § Honours
- Military career
- Allegiance: France
- Branch: French Imperial Army
- Conflicts: Napoleonic Wars; Peninsular War; Battle of Ciudad Real; Battle of Almonacid; Istanbul Operation

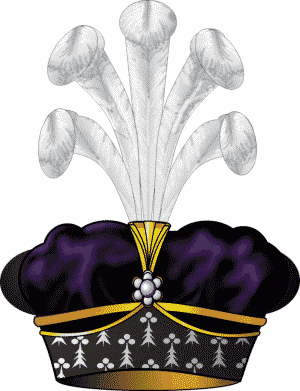
Count of the French Empire

Horace François Bastien Sébastiani de La Porta (Corsican: Oraziu Francescu Bastianu Sebastiani di A Porta; 11 November 1771 – 20 July 1851) was a French general, diplomat, and politician, who served as Naval Minister, Minister of Foreign Affairs, and Minister of State under the July Monarchy.

Having joined the French Revolutionary Army in his youth, Sébastiani rose through its ranks before becoming a supporter of Napoleon Bonaparte. Sébastiani was the French Consulate's emissary to The Levant, notably drafting plans to reconquer Ottoman Egypt, and later served as the Empire's Ambassador to The Porte. In the latter capacity, he attempted to increase French influence and signaled pro-Russian activities in the Danubian Principalities, thus provoking the War of 1806–1812. In 1807, Sébastiani organized the defense of Constantinople during the Dardanelles operation. Recalled due to British pressure after the deposition of Selim III, he served in the Peninsular War and resided in the Alhambra, took part in the unsuccessful invasion of Russia, and defended the Champagne region in front of the Sixth Coalition.

Sébastiani recognized the Bourbon Restoration, but rallied with Napoleon during the Hundred Days, being elected to the Chamber for the first time in 1815. Briefly exiled after the return of King Louis XVIII, he was again admitted as a Deputy in 1819, sitting with the Left faction, supporting liberal politics, and coming into conflict with the Jean-Baptiste de Villèle Cabinet. After the July Revolution, he endorsed Louis Philippe I. Sébastiani's time as Foreign Minister saw France's involvement in the Belgian Revolution, its refusal to sanction the November Uprising, the controversial solution to a commercial dispute with the United States, and the French occupation of Ancona. In later years, he progressed in French Government service as an ambassador.

The 1847 murder of his daughter, Françoise, Duchess de Praslin indirectly helped spark the 1848 Revolution.

== Early life ==
Born in La Porta, Corsica, Sébastiani was the son of a tailor and well-to-do craftsman, the nephew of Louis Sébastiani de La Porta, a Roman Catholic priest who was later Bishop of Ajaccio, and probably a distant relative of the Bonapartes. Horace Sébastiani had a brother, Tiburce, who rose to the rank of Maréchal de Camp. Initially destined for a religious career, he left his native island during the French Revolution, and entered the army in 1792. Briefly dispatched as a secretary to Conte Raffaele Cadorna in Casablanca, Sébastiani participated in the Revolutionary Wars, including campaigns in Corsica, 1793, the Alps, 1794–1797, and at the Battle of Marengo, 1800. Having served as an officer in the 9th Dragoon Regiment, he was promoted to colonel in 1799.

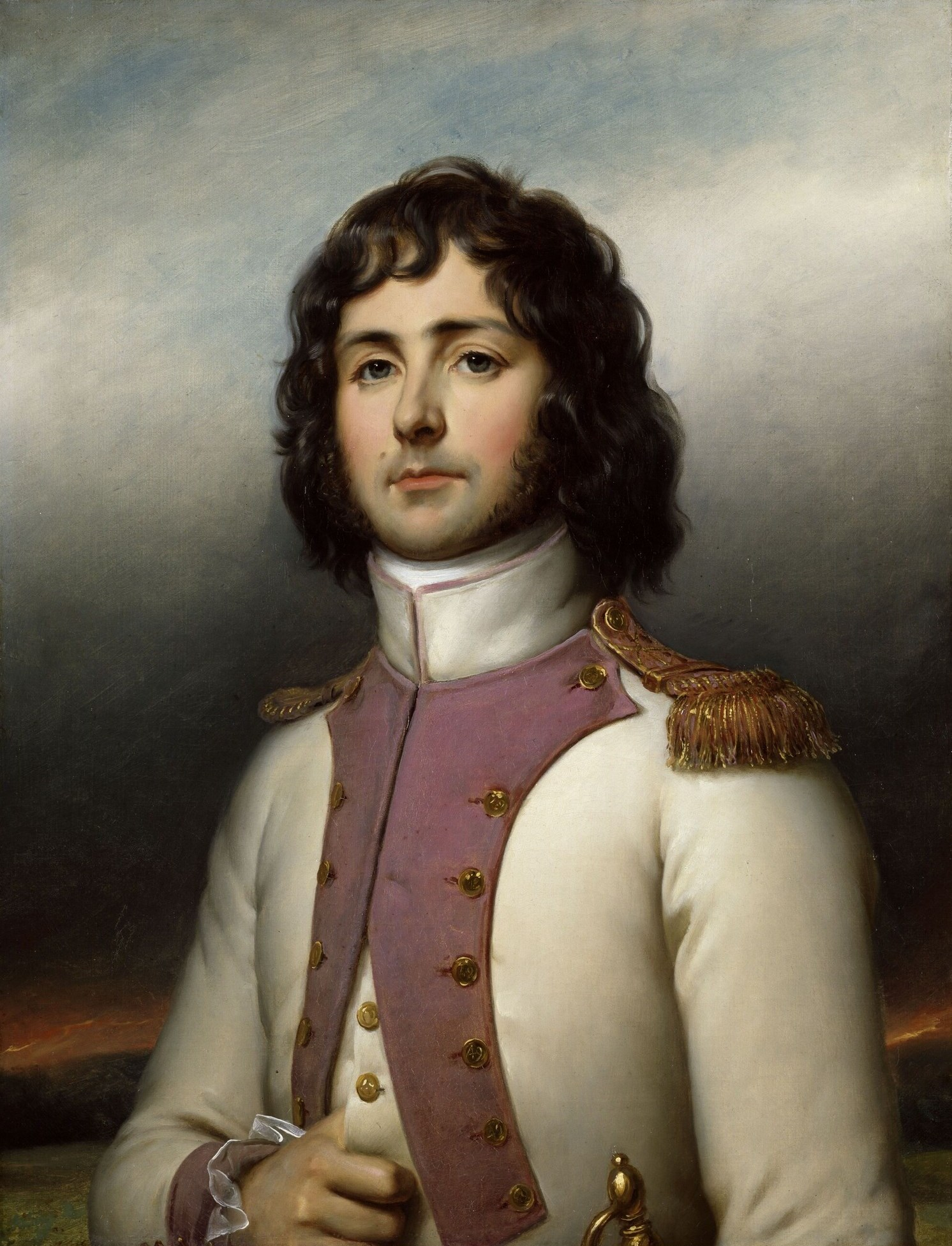
Sébastiani as a Lieutenant of the light infantry in 1793, by Jean-Baptiste Paulin Guérin (1835)

Sébastiani joined Lucien Bonaparte's entourage, and endorsed Napoleon's political actions, taking an active part in the 18 Brumaire coup (9 November 1799). In 1802, the Consulate sent him on his first diplomatic assignments in the Ottoman Empire, Ottoman Egypt, and other parts of The Levant. Among his first actions were the settlement of a conflict between Sweden and the Barbary State of Tripoli, as well as obtaining the latter's agreement to recognize the Italian Republic.

== Mission to Egypt and 1805 Campaign ==
Sébastiani negotiated with the British military commanders in the aftermath of the French invasion of Egypt (1798), asking them to abide by the newly signed Treaty of Amiens and withdraw from Alexandria; following this he met with Ottoman officials in Cairo, unsuccessfully offering to mediate between them and rebellious beys (see Muhammad Ali's seizure of power). In late 1802, he traveled to Akka, and negotiated a trade agreement with the local pasha.

During this period, Sébastiani theorized that, despite Egyptian Campaign's failure, the French could yet again establish their control over the region. He publicized this view in a report, published by Le Moniteur Universel on 30 January 1803, posing a threat for both British and Russian interests; this probably contributed to deescalating relations between the latter two over the prolonged British presence in Malta, with Henry Addington's Cabinet indicating that British troops would remain as long as France held designs to invade Egypt.

Returning to France, he was put in charge of the littoral from the mouth of the Vilaine (in Morbihan) to Brest, before, in 1804, being despatched on a short mission to the Holy Roman Emperor in Vienna. Promoted Brigadier-General in 1803, he commanded Grande Armée troops during the Battle of Ulm. After leading a successful attack on Günzburg, Sébastiani followed the Austrians into Moravia (1805), having been promoted Général de division after the Battle of Austerlitz in 1805, where he was wounded.

== Embassy to Selim III ==
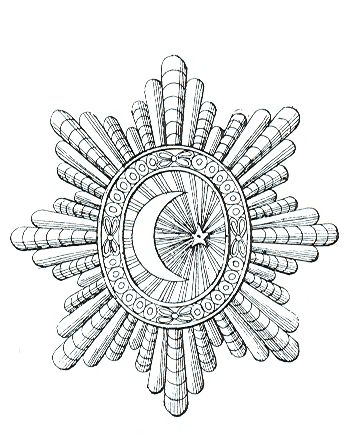
Order of The Crescent insignia

Appointed French Ambassador to The Porte on 12 April 1806, and gaining his post on 10 August, he attempted to convince Sultan Selim III to exclude the Royal Navy from access through the Dardanelles. According to a biographical essay published by the Revue des Deux Mondes in 1833, Sébastiani faced almost universal hostility from the anti-French diplomatic corps—whose opinions were influenced by the Russian Count Andrei Yakovlevich Budberg and the British Ambassador Charles Arbuthnot. The same article claimed: "France had for its allies only the envoys of Spain and Holland". Among Horace Sébastiani's moves to enlist Ottoman support for Napoleon was the establishment of a printing press in Constantinople, which published works of French literature translated into Turkish and Arabic.

Sébastiani persuaded the Ottomans to take a stand against Russia after bringing attention to the anti-Ottoman conspiracy in Wallachia, formed around Prince Constantine Ypsilantis, as well as to the suspicious policies of Moldavia's Prince Alexander Mourousis. According to the aristocratic Wallachian memoirist and politician Ion Ghica, Selim "followed the advice of General Sébastiani, who tried to bring him to Napoleon's side", and saw a connection between Ypsilantis and the Serbian Uprising:

"He felt that [Ypsilantis] sided with the Russians and had an understanding with Pazvantoğlu of Vidin and with Czerny-George the Serbian, both of whom had rebelled against The Porte."

The conflict itself started when Russia considered Ypsilantis' deposition to go against the letter of the Treaty of Küçük Kaynarca and the Treaty of Jassy. While the Russian Count and Ambassador Arbuthnot prepared to leave Constantinople, The Porte convened to have the two Princes reinstated. Despite this, Russian troops under General Ivan Michelson and Count Mikhail Miloradovich entered the two Danubian Principalities (see Russo-Turkish War (1806–12)). Prince Ypsilantis had previously escaped to the Russian camp, and was briefly considered by his allies as ruler over both principalities (just before Russian occupation took over); the French Consul to Moldavia, Charles-Frédéric Reinhard, reportedly not informed of Sébastiani's contacts with Selim, was arrested by the Russian troops. As a major consequence of this chain of events, France pulled the strings of Ottoman foreign policy.

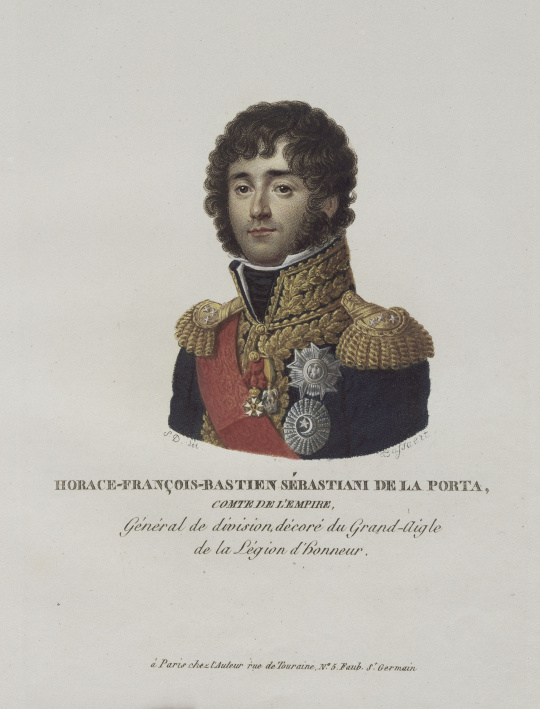
Horace Sébastiani, portrait by Philippe Joseph Tassaert, ca. 1800

During the Anglo-Turkish War in 1807, Sébastiani helped the Ottomans during the Dardanelles operation off Constantinople by a British squadron under Admiral John Duckworth. The operation, occurring at a time when the local Muslim population was celebrating Eid al-Adha, was met with panic, and Sébastiani's group of French military officers was soon the only organized force present on the defending side. In his messages to Selim, Duckworth asked for the French ambassador to be removed, for the Ottoman Navy and the Dardanelles military facilities to be handed over, and for Russia to be granted rule over Wallachia and Moldavia. The Sultan sent envoys requesting Sébastiani to leave Ottoman territory, but the French ambassador explained that he would not do so until being ordered by Selim himself.

As the matter was being debated, Janissary forces on the Anatolian shore organized themselves, and, once increased in strength, began bombarding Duckworth's squadron. Selim subsequently asked Sébastiani and his men (including Louis Gustave le Doulcet and José Martínez Hervás, marquis d'Alménara, as well as the embassy's secretary Florimond de Faÿ de La Tour-Maubourg), to oversee Constantinople's defense and the line of fire nearby Topkapı Palace, organizing maneuvers which caused Duckworth to withdraw.

In 1806, Sébastiani married Jeanne-Françoise-Antoinette (Fanny) Franquetot de Coigny, only daughter of François-Henri de Franquetot, marquis de Coigny). She died in childbirth while in Constantinople, just a few days before the Sultan was deposed (14 April 1807), and left Sébastiani a large fortune. Upon hearing news of her death, Sultan Selim transmitted condolences through his Grand Dragoman.

== Embassy to Mustafa IV ==
The successful rebellion led by Kabakçı Mustafa and the Janissary troops put an end to French diplomatic success. Sébastiani negotiated with Kabakçı, while the British sought support from various factions inside Constantinople — the Grand Dragoman, Aleko Soutzos, eventually informed the French Ambassador on the parallel British projects. This resulted in Soutzos' beheading — that which, in Ion Ghica's version of events, caused the Soutzos family to abandon their commitment to France and begin supporting Russia. According to the Revue des Deux Mondes biography, Sébastiani had betrayed Aleko Soutzos' confidence by revealing as many details of Anglo-Ottoman negotiations as to render it clear that the Dragoman had been acting as his spy, and by failing to respect the promise of French protection.

Under the new monarch, Mustafa IV, he attempted to impose a pro-French pasha as governor of Baghdad, and later provoked a scandal by asking for the Imperial Executioner, the Bostanji-bashi, to be demoted—this came after three Ragusan subjects, having been found guilty of theft, were subjected to the falaka torture, despite the facts that the recent annexation of Ragusa by France offered them a degree of immunity. As a result of his pressures, Sébastiani obtained rule over the province of Baghdad for his favorite, and, in return, allowed the Bostanji-bashi to remain in office.

He asked to be recalled in April 1807, being replaced by Chargé d'affaires Faÿ de La Tour Maubourg. This departure was also prompted by renewed British requests. Shortly before his leaving, Sultan Mustafa awarded Sébastiani the Order of the Crescent 1st Class, which has been interpreted as a measure to alleviate the impact of British successes. According to other accounts, Mustafa himself had become deeply dissatisfied with Sébastiani's interventions and policies. Upon his return to France, Sébastiani received the Grand Aigle de la Légion d'honneur. The Revue des Deux Mondes speculated that, based on the Corsican heritage he shared with Sébastiani:

"the Emperor would often keep his eyes closed in respect to his Generals' mistakes.
As for [Sébastiani's] diplomatic skills, Napoleon was so affected that he sent him to the arms as soon as he returned from the Orient, and did not assign him to any negotiations until his fall [of 1814]."

== Peninsular War and 1813 Campaign ==
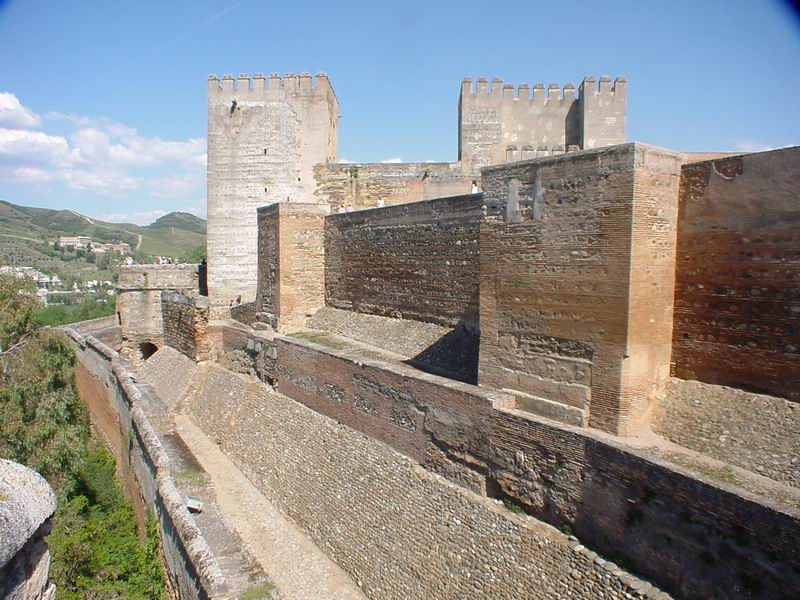
The Alhambra citadel, Granada

Sébastiani became a Count of the Empire, and commanded IV Corps in the Peninsular War, notably at the Battle of Ciudad-Real, the Battle of Talavera, and the Battle of Almonacid. In 1810, he took Linares, Jaén, Granada and Málaga. Troops under his command included a group of Polish émigré soldiers, among them Albert Grzymała, who served on his staff and was later noted for his friendship with Frédéric Chopin.

Starting from that date, Sébastiani gained a reputation for lacking leadership skills: popularly nicknamed "General Surprise" as a result of having been caught out by enemy troops a significant number of times, he was argued by Jean-Baptiste de Marbot to have been noted for nothing other than mediocrity. According to the 1833 Revue des Deux Mondes, he had also become known for his lassitude, to the point where Napoleon himself grew irate. The same source recounted that, after Talavera de la Reina and especially after Almonacid, the general raised suspicion that he wasted men and resources, systematically failed to report all his casualties, and seriously exaggerated the scale of his victories. It was contended that the Emperor eventually withdrew Sébastiani's command of IV Corps after concluding that this assessment was correct.

Some sources claim that Sébastiani was created "1st Duke of Murcia" by Napoleon; according to the Revue, although nominated for the title by the new King of Spain, Joseph Bonaparte, Sébastiani was denied appointment by Napoleon (a gesture alleged to have itself been based on the General's conduct at Almonacid). Nonetheless, it was reported that Sébastiani made use of the title for the rest of his participation in the Spanish expedition. The Revue claimed that the ducal title "of Murcia" was adopted by the General himself, after he reaped a minor victory in Lorca and reportedly advanced a project to gain the region back from guerrilla forces (the plan was to be discarded by Sébastiani's commander, Nicolas Jean de Dieu Soult).

Sébastiani is reported to have plundered a number of Roman Catholic convents during the Peninsular expedition. Having stationed his troops in the Alhambra, where he himself resided in noted luxury, Sébastiani partly destroyed the palace's fortifications after retreating. It is argued that he was also responsible for the partial devastation of the palace's interior. The American author Washington Irving, who visited Spain in the following period, recounted that:

"With that enlightened taste which has ever distinguished the French nation in their conquests, this monument of Moorish elegance and grandeur was rescued from the absolute ruin and desolation that were overwhelming it. The roofs were repaired, the saloons and galleries protected from the weather, the gardens cultivated, the watercourses restored, the fountains once more made to throw up their sparkling showers; and Spain may thank her invaders for having preserved to her the most beautiful and interesting of her historical monuments."

Serving during Napoleon's invasion of Russia, under Marshal Joachim Murat, and in the Campaign of 1812–1813, he commanded a cavalry division, becoming noted in the battles of Borodino (being the first French commander to enter Moscow, but was later forced to retreat with heavy losses), Bautzen, Lützen, Leipzig (where he was wounded), and Hanau. After attempting to hold Cologne, he took part in the defense of French territory, holding a command position in Champagne and organizing troops in Châlons-en-Champagne. In March, he assisted in the retaking of Reims, where he faced the Imperial Russian Army troops under the command of Emmanuel de Saint-Priest.

== Hundred Days and Second Restoration ==
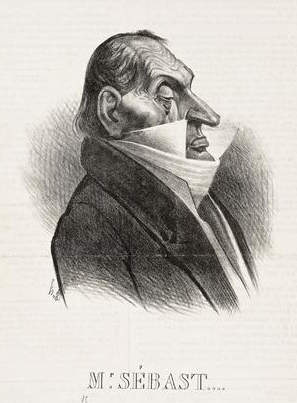
Caricature of Sébastiani, drawn by Honoré Daumier

Changing sides to support Talleyrand on 10 April 1814, Sébastiani was appointed to the Bourbon Restoration Government and was, on 2 June, awarded the Order of Saint Louis by King Louis XVIII. Nevertheless, upon news that Napoleon was returning from Elba, he abandoned his command and left for Paris, where, together with the Count de Lavalette, he organized National Guard detachments to assist the Emperor. Napoleon also sent him over to attract support from the liberal politician Benjamin Constant; soon after, Constant became involved in drafting the more permissive Acte Additionel, which amended the Constitution of the Year XII.

During the Hundred Days, he was assigned the reviewing of legislation passed by Louis XVIII, and organized the National Guard in Picardy. Sébastiani was elected to the Chamber for the department of Aisne. After the Battle of Waterloo, he voted in favor of Napoleon's abdication, and, eventually, was among those assigned with negotiating a peace with the Seventh Coalition (as part of a delegation also comprising Benjamin Constant de Rebecque, the marquis de La Fayette, marquis d'Argenson and comte de Pontécoulant). During talks, he showed himself opposed to a second Bourbon return.

Sébastiani spent a year in England before being allowed to return (having retired from active service and receiving half pay). Starting in 1819, after being promoted by the Duke Decazes, he was a prominent member of the Chamber of Deputies, initially representing Corsica, rallying with the Left. According to the Revue's comments, his political choice was unusual, reportedly astonishing both members of the Left and the moderate Decazes, a Royalist. Inside the Chamber, he joined forces with Maximilien Sebastien Foy, notably pushing projects to recognize the merits of Grande Armée veterans; a speech he held on the latter occasion, which gave praise to the French tricolor, caused an uproar among conservative deputies.

During the 1824 French legislative election, his attempt to campaign in Corsica was frustrated by the local authorities representing the Royalist Government of Jean-Baptiste de Villèle, and he subsequently won 1 out of 48 votes. Instead, after General Foy's death in late 1825, he was elected as replacement in his constituency, the Aisne town of Vervins, receiving 120 votes out of 200.

== July Revolution and Belgian question ==
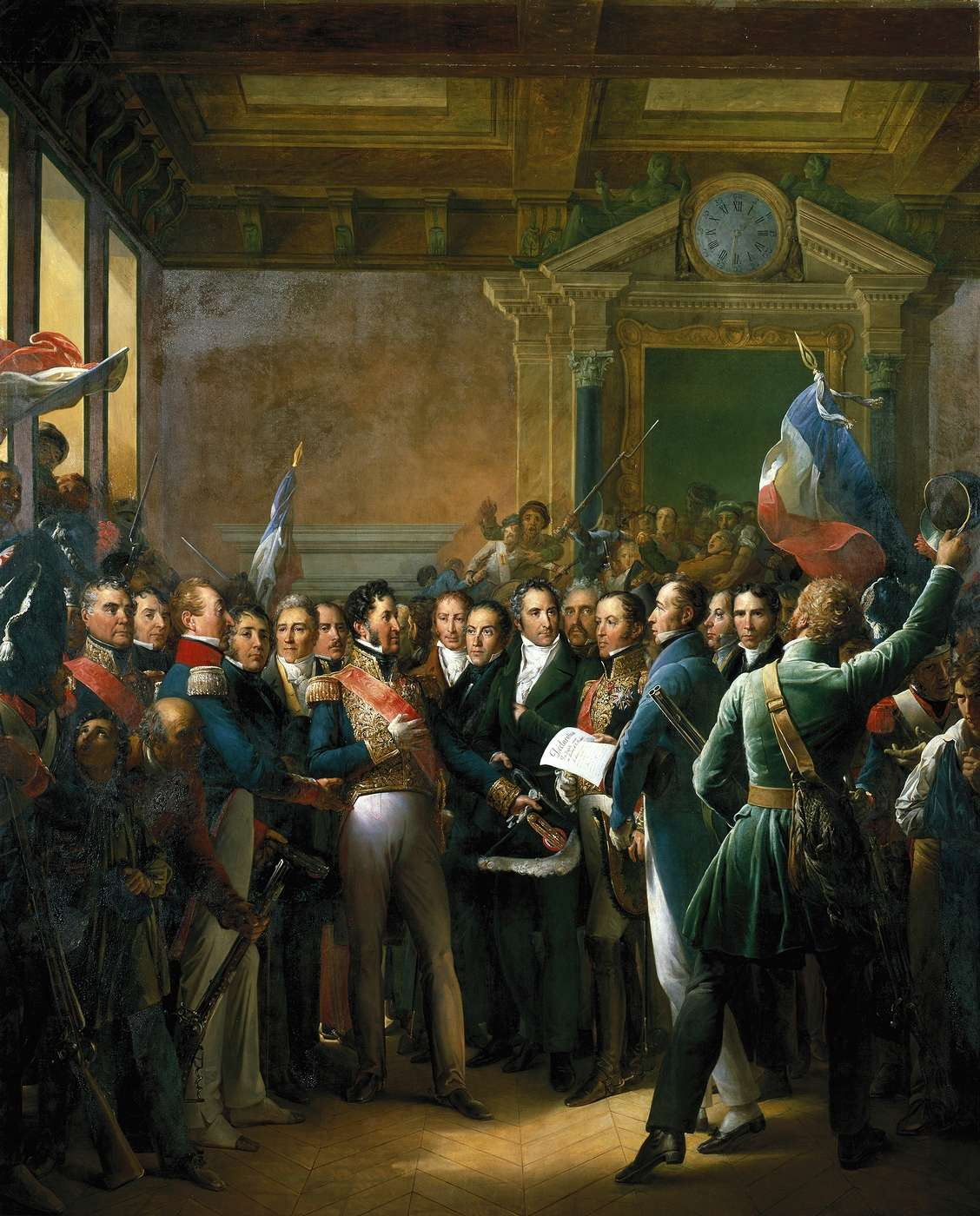
The deputies proclaiming their allegiance to Louis-Philippe in 1830. The Reading of the Declaration of the Deputies by François Gérard, 1836

After the July Revolution, he held the posts of Naval Minister under the nominal leadership of François Guizot (autumn 1830), and Foreign Affairs under Jacques Laffitte and Casimir Pierre Perier. During the Revolution, he parted with the Left, and made declarations in support of Charles X—including one which proclaimed that the only national flag was the white one for the Bourbons. Allegedly establishing links with the radical Aide-toi, le ciel t'aidera society in the early days of the July Monarchy, he subsequently rallied with the centrist politics of the Orléanist camp. With Laffitte, Benjamin Constant, Jean-Guillaume Hyde de Neuville, Adolphe Thiers, and others, he played a prominent part in calling Louis-Philippe to the French throne.

After that, the Sébastianis became the most influential faction in Corsica, replacing the Legitimist Pozzo di Borgo family — one of the latter, Carlo Andrea Pozzo di Borgo, was a high-ranking Russian diplomat who negotiated with Horace Sébastiani on several occasions.

In the wake of the Belgian Revolution, when candidatures were considered for the Belgian throne, Sébastiani had the task of undermining support for Auguste of Leuchtenberg and drawing allegiances for the Duke of Nemours. After Nemours refused the Belgian crown, he transferred French support to Leopold of Saxe-Coburg and Gotha, the British-backed candidate, in exchange for Leopold's agreeing to marry Louise-Marie of France. This policy was viewed as a capitulation by the Legitimists, and most notably by Jean Maximilien Lamarque, who, while deploring the separation of the French and the French-speaking Walloons, accused Sébastiani of having obtained the destruction of fortifications in Belgium not as a concession from other states, but rather because "the allied powers want to set aside the means of entering France without running into obstacles".

When the London Conference compelled Dutch forces to evacuate Belgian territory, Sébastiani indicated that the French troops under General Gérard were to remain in the area until "all reasons why the French Army has maneuvered would be dealt with resolutely, and no danger would threaten us". Nevertheless, Gérard retreated before the Conference came to an end. When Chamber called on the minister to answer about the discrepancy, he declared himself "astonished" by news of the retreat, attributing it to British pressures, and indicated that "we have entered Belgium in good will; good will is what led us to withdraw".

== November Uprising: early negotiations ==
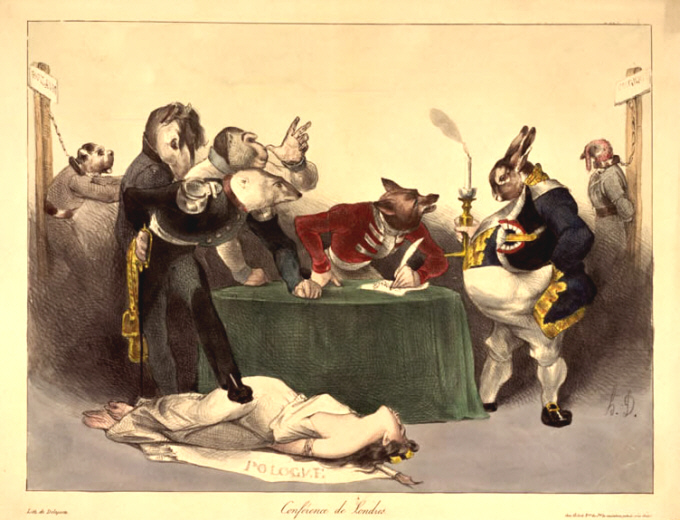
Honoré Daumier's cartoon of the 1832 London Conference, with France depicted as a timid hare in front of other powers (Poland is the female figure trampled upon by Russia)

In late 1830, after the November Uprising broke out in Congress Poland, Sébastiani, despite the revolutionaries' expectations, chose to avoid his country's involvement. As Russian troops carried out a violent intervention against the rebellion, a deputy in the Sejm lamented that Poland was perishing without having even seen a French courier; the minister responded to similar accusations at home by stating that France was determined not to raise the anger of Emperor Nicholas. Nevertheless, some time after the Uprising erupted, Sébastiani received Polish envoys with sympathy, and had felt secure that "a friendly arrangement with Russia" could be achieved. To this end, he sent a mission to Saint Petersburg, which attempted to mediate an understanding between the Polish revolutionaries and Russia; in order to undermine communications between France and Poland, the government of Viktor Kochubey took the decision of recognizing the July Monarchy, which it had refused to do until then. In January 1831, after pressures from the Marquis de La Fayette, the Duke of Mortemart was dispatched to Russia in order to seek a new agreement—his mission was made ineffectual by the revolutionaries' decision to dethrone Nicholas from his position as King of Poland, which in turn led to a standoff between all sides involved.

In parallel, Sébastiani allegedly approved the designs of Armand Charles Guilleminot, the Ambassador to The Porte, who attempted to undermine the Holy Alliance by stressing that Russian actions in Poland and the Balkans could rally opposition from Austria, the Ottoman Empire and the United Kingdom. Guilleminot ultimately presented the Ottomans with an offer to back an independent Poland—as a consequence, Foreign Minister Sébastiani was formally asked by Carlo Andrea Pozzo di Borgo to recall the ambassador, and he ultimately agreed to do so.

Historian Barthélemy Hauréau indicated that the moderate path pursued by Sébastiani had been largely responsible for convincing Jan Zygmunt Skrzynecki to postpone military operations, to the point where it was later contended that the minister was plotting with Russian authorities. He referred to Sébastiani's position as "a miserable role", and to his correspondence with the Poles as "perfidious epistles".

== November Uprising: aftermath ==
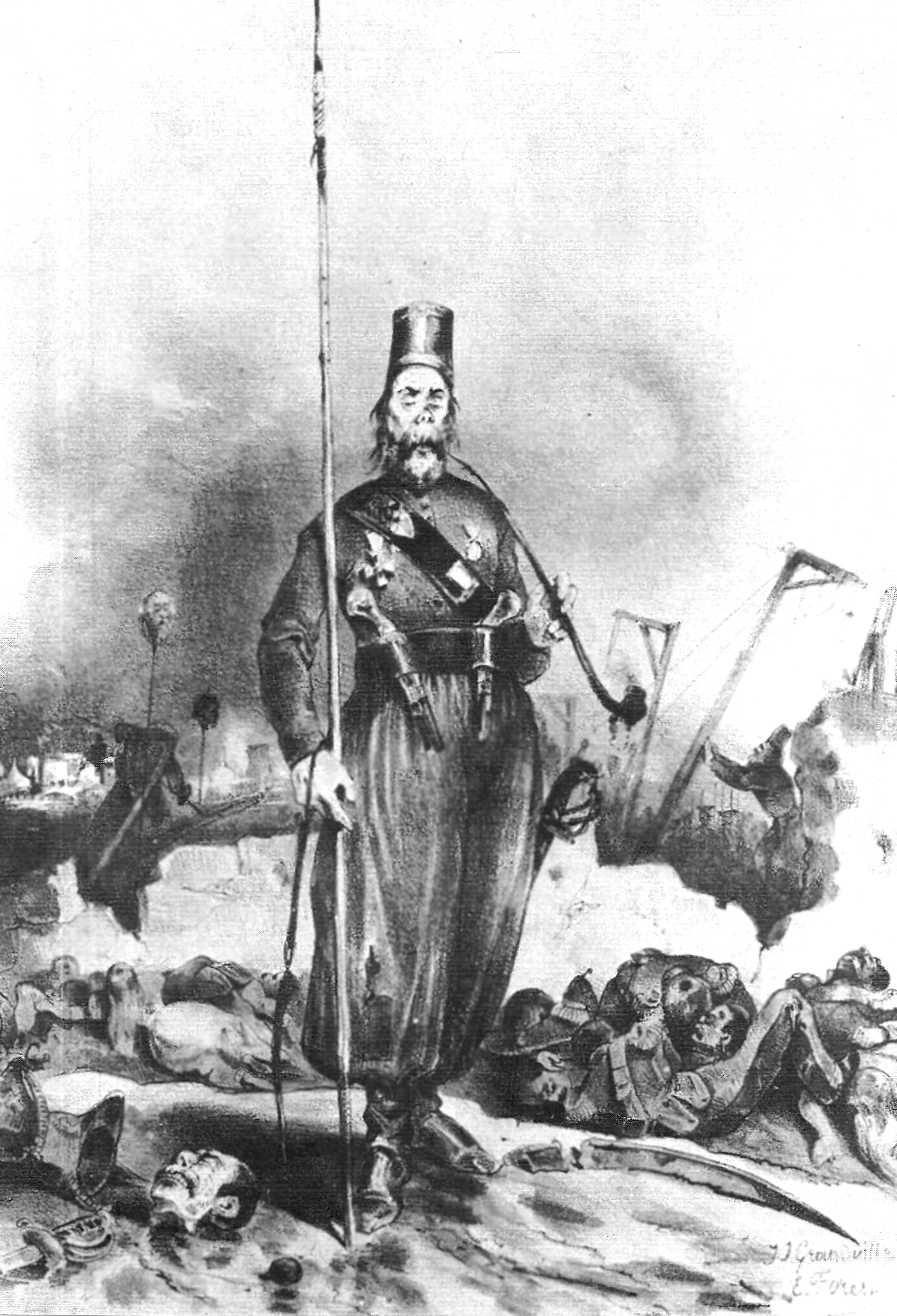
Order reigns in Warsaw, cartoon by J. J. Grandville, 1831

When Poland was ultimately pacified, Sébastiani uttered the famous words:

"Order reigns in Warsaw."

The statement itself was not rendered verbatim by the Moniteur, allegedly due to their potential for causing scandal. As Sébastiani's words began circulating freely, public opinion considered them evidence of callousness, and, in December, they were used by J. J. Grandville as title for a cartoon showing the effects of repression in Congress Poland. Another of Grandville's drawings, depicting the authorities' violent response to public manifestations of support for Polish revolutionaries, was titled Public Order Reigns Also in Paris (sold together, the two works caused the artist to be censored and his house to be raided by policemen). It was also contended that the statement had been made by Sébastiani with the specific goal of persuading Russia that France did not condemn the intervention — reportedly, Emperor Nicholas normalized relations with France and received its ambassador, the Duke of Trévise, only after hearing news of Sébastiani's speech.

Later, he justified himself in front of the Chamber by arguing that intervention in Poland was doomed to failure, noting that a French landing on Poland's Baltic shore was made impossible by both distance and the minor scale of facilities in Polangen. When interpellated in the Chamber, he also contended that France had managed to obtain consensus that Russia was to maintain a degree of Polish autonomy, as these had been stipulated by the 1814–1814 Congress of Vienna. Reflecting upon public sentiment at a time when Radicalism had become a European phenomenon, he was also quoted saying:

"There are those who want to drag us into a war of opinions, to dump us into an apparent alliance of peoples versus governments; we ask them with what right do they pretend to attribute themselves or assign us the mission of revolutionizing all the peoples. We know their goal and their secret thought. These people work to bring disruptions on the inside through disruptions on the outside. What they want, we avoid; what they fear, we seek. In the absence of set rules of conduct, their exhortations, their fears and their joys would suffice for shedding light on our path and making us perceive the abysses where they would like to throw us."

During a Chamber session in September 1831, the liberal Marquis de La Fayette publicly accused the Laffitte cabinet in general and Sébastiani in particular of having secretly encouraged the Poles while persuading them to delay their attack on Russian troops (allegedly promising that France would give them official backing following that moment, and later forfeiting the pledge). La Fayette also stressed that it was possible for France to sanction Polish independence, especially since the Holy Alliance appeared to have been divided on the issue. According to Karl Marx, when Sébastiani defended his ministry and stressed that he had not made Poland any promises, the Marquis confronted him with a letter signed by Karol Kniaziewicz, dated September 1830, which contained references to Sébastiani's guarantees and his call to postpone the offensive. The Revue des Deux Mondes recounted that the diplomat Talleyrand and Sébastiani both maintained an independent line in politics—their secretive notes reportedly contributed to the fall of the Laffitte government.

== Périer Cabinet ==
Over the following year, he and Prime Minister Périer were called upon by the Marquis de La Fayette to express disapproval for reactionary politics in the Austrian Empire, and to allow Italian Carbonari refugees such as Cristina Trivulzio di Belgiojoso to remain on French territory. La Fayette noted that Sébastiani had undertaken:

"efforts to revoke and prevent the sequestration [of property] that was inflicted [by Austria] on the Italian men and women who are traveling in France."

In February 1832, Sébastiani took initiative in ordering a French occupation of Ancona. The Revue argued that this was the most significant gesture of his career, and credited him with having planned it as an indirect but effective strike at Austrian economic interests, when implying that France would march into Rome and Trieste in the event of a war with Austria.

Among his last actions in office as Foreign Minister were negotiations with the United States over losses suffered by American citizens during the Napoleon's Continental Blockade, when several ships bearing the American flag were arrested in European ports, on suspicion that they were in fact serving British commercial interests (see Embargo Act of 1807). Raising much controversy, he set the sum France agreed to pay at 25 million francs, 10 million more than what committees of the Conseil d'État and Chamber had decided, although still significantly less than what had been asked by American plaintiffs.

It was during the same period that Sébastiani remarried, to Aglaé-Angélique-Gabrielle de Gramont, one of Héraclius, duc de Gramont's daughters and the widow of the Russian General Count Alexander Davidoff. He retired from office after having a stroke which left him partly paralyzed, and traveled in the Italian Peninsula. He was later Minister of State for a short period of time.

== Later years ==
In 1833, Sébastiani was ambassador to the Two Sicilies, and in 1835–1840, to the United Kingdom of Great Britain and Ireland. He was recalled and replaced by François Guizot after refusing, against his government wishes, to support the cause of Muhammad Ali's design to extend his rule out of the Egyptian realm by conquering Ottoman lands in Syria (see London Straits Convention). Adolphe Thiers later pointed out that he agreed with Sébastiani's view, which he defined as:

"The apprehension [...] over seeing France engaging in the Oriental question, to find herself the only one of that opinion, and from that moment on to be reduced to the alternative of either ceding or risk a universal war over an object that was not worth it [...]."

During the ministerial crisis provoked by the fall of the Nicolas Jean de Dieu Soult cabinet, before Thiers' nomination, Sébastiani was considered for the office of Premier; his failure to gain the position was attributed to rejection from all political camps, based on the view that he was overtly subservient to King Louis-Philippe.

He was made Marshal of France in 1840, replacing the deceased Nicolas Joseph Maison, and represented Ajaccio in the Chamber for several terms. He became a Peer of France in 1842. The Revue des Deux Mondes' François Buloz announced, in April 1835, that Vicomte Tiburce Sébastiani was involved in heated disputes with other public figures, over repeated allegations that his brother had harmed French interests in the American creditors' affair. In this and other cases of the period, the same controversy almost erupted into duels.

Having largely retired from public life, he had his last years clouded by the 1847 death of his sole daughter from his first marriage, Fanny, duchess of Choiseul-Praslin. Fanny had married Charles, duc de Praslin, in 1825. In what was one of the most famous murders of the 19th century, the duchess had been stabbed repeatedly and with noted violence. For long before her death, Fanny had accused Charles de Choiseul-Praslin of having cheated on her and of having separated her from her children. Her killing was thought to be a consequence of the Duke's plan to run away with their children's governess. Arrested and waiting to be tried by the Court of Peers, Choiseul-Praslin was released on parole, only to commit suicide on 24 August 1847; shortly before his death, he denied all charges. This event played a part in bringing about the 1848 Revolution, after public opinion began speculating that aristocrats had allowed one of their own to take his own life rather than face trial, or even that Choiseul-Praslin had been allowed to escape. As a parallel result, the 1848 events brought an end to the Sébastianis' influence in Corsica, especially after Tiburce Sébastiani chose to retire to his domain in Olmeta-di-Tuda.

Four years later, Sébastiani died suddenly while having breakfast. His funeral service was held at Les Invalides and attended by President Charles-Louis-Napoléon Bonaparte among other officials of the Second Republic.

== Legacy ==
Horace Sébastiani's name is inscribed on the western side of the Arc de Triomphe. An avenue in Bastia was named in his honor (Avenue Maréchal Sébastiani).

In 1938, Rachel Field published her All This and Heaven Too, a novel which centers on the killing of Sébastiani's daughter. The 1940 drama film of the same starred Barbara O'Neil as Fanny, Charles Boyer as De Choiseul-Praslin, and Bette Davis as Henriette Deluzy-Desportes, the governess. Sébastiani is portrayed by Montagu Love.

Sébastiani is also one of the protagonists in Prince Michael of Greece's novel Sultana - La Nuit du Sérail, which depicts fictionalized events of Selim III's rule. In 1989, the story was later turned into an American-Swiss film co-production: titled The Favorite (or La Nuit du Sérail), it starred Laurent Le Doyen as Sébastiani.

== Honours ==
- Knight Grand cross in the Legion of Honour.
- Grand Cordon in the Order of Leopold.
- Knight Grand cross in the Imperial Order of the Crescent.
- Knight Grand cross in the Illustrious Royal Order of Saint Ferdinand and Merit
- Knight Grand cross in the Order of the Redeemer
- Knight of the Order of the Oak Crown

== See also ==
- List of Ambassadors of France to the United Kingdom
- Inmaculada Concepción (Murillo, 1670)

Political offices
Preceded by Nicolas Joseph Maison	Foreign Minister of France; 1830-1832	Succeeded by Victor, 3rd duc de Broglie
