= Françoise, Duchesse de Praslin =

French duchess and heiress (1807–1847)

Françoise Altarice Rosalba Sébastiani
- Duchess de Choiseul-Praslin
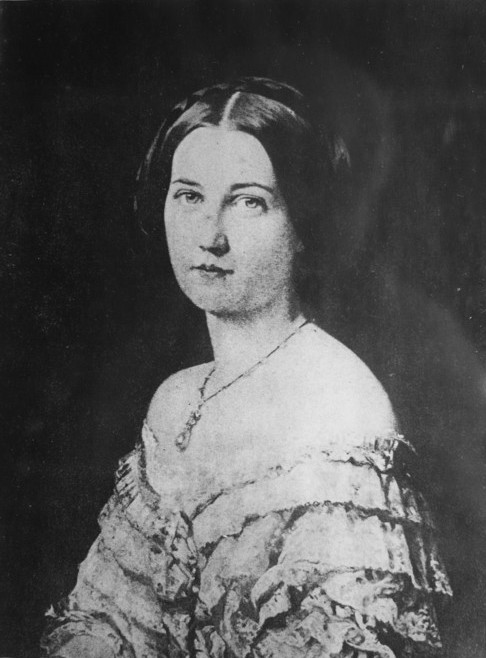
- Born: 14 April 1807; Constantinople, Ottoman Empire
- Died: 17 August 1847 (aged 40); Paris, France
- Cause of death: Homicide
- Noble family: Sébastiani
- Spouse: Charles de Choiseul-Praslin
- Issue: Louise, Horace, Gaston
- Father: Horace François Bastien Sébastiani de La Porta
- Mother: Jeanne-Françoise-Antoinette "Fanny" Franquetot de Coigny

Françoise, Duchess de Choiseul-Praslin (April 14, 1807 – August 17, 1847) was a French duchess and heiress who was found murdered. Her husband, Charles de Choiseul, Duke of Praslin was believed guilty for her death and committed suicide while awaiting trial days later on August 24, 1847. These events in 1847 contributed to the French Revolution of 1848.

== Biography ==
Her birth name was Françoise Altarice Rosalba Sébastiani. Her nickname was "Fanny". She was the daughter of Jeanne-Françoise-Antoinette "Fanny" Sébastiani (née Franquetot de Coigny) (1778–1807) and Horace Sébastiani (1771–1851), a French politician and army general. She was born in Constantinople where her father was stationed. Her mother died while giving birth to her.

Her family was very wealthy and her father was a "peer" (pair de France) in Corsica. Those who were peers held the highest, most exclusive title of honor and distinction within the French nobility. The vast majority of French nobles (even most dukes) were not peers. It was an extraordinary honor reserved only for a small, elite fraction of the aristocracy and high-ranking clergy. Derived from the Latin "par", meaning "equal," the title signified that these elite individuals were considered equal to the monarch in honor and dignity. The king was simply viewed as the ''primus inter pares''—"first among equals". In contrast, in Britain, most noblemen hold a peerage.

She married the duke at age 17 in 1824 and had as many as 9 children with him, (Note: List of children according to sources: Marie Laure Isabelle (1826 - 1878, by marriage de Cordero de Pampara); Charlotte Louise Cécile (1828 - 1902, by marriage de Gramont); Fanny Césarine Berthe (1830 - 1897, by marriage de Robersart); Alice Jeanne Slanie (1831 - 1877, by marriage de Chabannes Vergers); Marie Marthe (1833 - 1914, by marriage de Montalembert d'Essé); Gaston Louis Philippe, 6th Duke of Praslin (1834 - 1906); Léontine Laure Augustine (1835 - 1911, by marriage d'Adda Salvaterra); Eugène Antoine Horace (1837 - 1915, styled comte de Choiseul Praslin) and; François Antoine Hector Raynald (1839 - 1916).) with many miscarriages. After going through several governesses for their children, they hired a woman named Henriette Deluzy. Deluzy spent six years with the family, and it was a public scandal when it was widely reported the duke and Deluzy were lovers, which infuriated the duchess.

The duchess fired Deluzy in June 1847, which sent their household into a tailspin. The Duchess felt she was being estranged from her children and her husband had lost interest in her. She was no longer thin and beautiful like she was when they first married when she was 17. She was now nearing 40 years old and was over-weight from her many childbirths. She threatened to divorce the duke after he refused to fire Deluzy himself, which would mean that her family's money would go with her, leaving him much less wealthy.

This was not such an issue since his own father, Charles Laure Hugues Théobald, duc de Choiseul-Praslin, had left him a sizeable fortune amounting to well over nine million francs. She had announced her plans to wrest the children from him by declaring him unfit to have custody of the children because of his supposed adultery. The duc was first and foremost an utterly devoted father and that he could not bear. It was widely understood that that was what propelled him to take this step. In those days divorce would have severely hampered his daughters chances of brilliant matches and thus in an attempt to dispel one scandal he propitiated the worst of its kind by resorting to murder

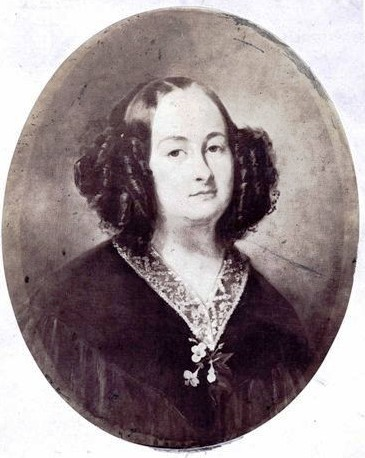
Portrait of the Duchess de Praslin in later years.

It is generally believed that, during a visit to Paris, the duc murdered her while she was sleeping. After Deluzy was fired, she had moved into the lodging house of one Mme Renaud. The governess had been desperate for a letter of recommendation from the duchesse which, declaring herself innocent of the charge of having an affair with the duc and believing herself to have dedicated the past six years of her life to caring for the Praslin children, she was entitled to and without which she would find it impossible to get another post. The duchesse possibly seeing a chance to gain her revenge on the governess she sorely detested is believed to have refused to write the recommendation.

The duchesse had her throat slashed and was hit with blunt objects, leaving cuts and marks all over her body. This caused further scandal because her husband, being a duc, was protected from being sentenced and jailed until other peers met and came to an agreement on the proceedings. While the duke awaited what was likely to be a long prison sentence, he poisoned himself with arsenic. He died within six days of first appearing sick on August 24, 1847. He never confessed to his wife's murder.

The governess, Henriette Deluzy, was arrested because officials believed she could have been involved in the plot with the duc to kill the duchesse. She was cleared of any wrongdoing, left France, and emigrated to the United States where she married and hosted an artistic and intellectual salon. The younger children of the duc and duchesse were split up and raised by family members.

French society was still reverberating from the aristocratic Teste–Cubières political corruption scandal which was revealed in May 1847. The controversy created by the death of the duc and duchesse further contributed to the start of the French Revolution of 1848. The couple were considered members of the royal court of the King Louis Philippe I and their scandals added to the public feeling that the King and his court were not trustworthy or honorable. King Louis was forced to abdicate the throne and he fled to England where he lived the rest of his life.

During this time period, the family owned Vaux-le-Vicomte and had a residence in Paris.

== In popular culture ==
Writer Rachel Field, who claimed Henriette Deluzy was her great-aunt, wrote a novel about the events titled All This, and Heaven Too, which was released in 1938. In 1940, a film was made of the same name All This, and Heaven Too, in which the duchess was portrayed by actress Barbara O'Neil, the duke by Charles Boyer and Bette Davis portraying Henriette Deluzy. O'Neil was nominated for the Academy Award for Best Supporting Actress for her performance as the duchess, and the film was nominated for Best Picture of the Year.
