= David Dudley Field I =

American clergyman and historian (1781–1867)

David Dudley Field
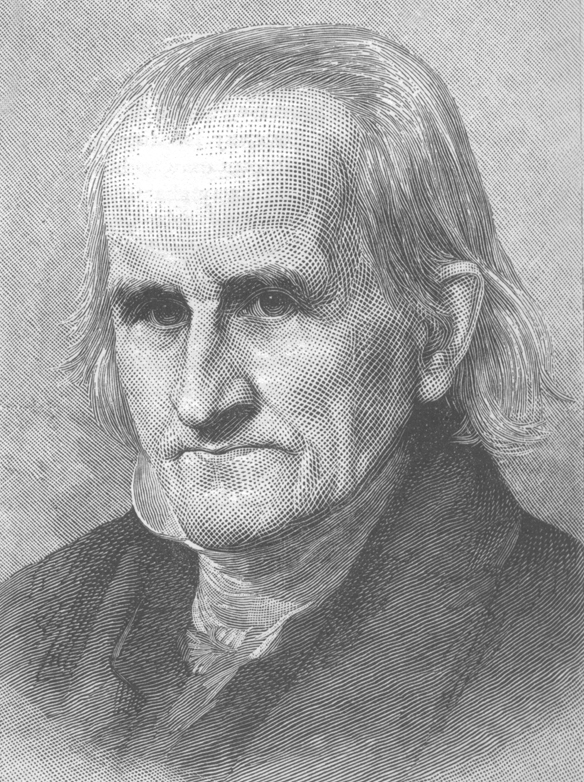
- Born: May 20, 1781; Madison, Connecticut, U.S.
- Died: April 15, 1867 (aged 85); Stockbridge, Massachusetts, U.S.
- Education: Yale University; Williams College (DD)
- Occupations: Clergyman and historian
- Spouse: Submit Dickinson Field (m. 1803; died 1861)
- Children: 9, including David II, Stephen, Cyrus, and Henry

David Dudley Field I (May 20, 1781 – April 15, 1867) was an American Congregational clergyman and historical writer. He was born in East Guilford, now Madison, Connecticut on May 20, 1781, the son of Timothy Field, an officer during the American Revolution. He graduated from Yale in 1802, and received Doctorate in Divinity degree from Williams College. He held pastorates at Haddam, Connecticut, and Stockbridge, Massachusetts. He wrote A History of the Town of Pittsfield, in Berkshire County, Massachusetts (1814), A Statistical Account of the County of Middlesex in Connecticut (1819), The Genealogy of the Brainerd Family, in the United States, with Numerous Sketches of Individuals (1857), Centennial Address with Historical Sketches of Cromwell, Portland, Chatham, Middle-Haddam, Middletown and its Parishes (1853), among other works. He married Submit Dickinson (1782-1861) in 1803, daughter of Noah Dickinson, who was a veteran of the French and Indian War and served in the Continental Army. They both raised nine children, four of whom achieved national prominence. He is buried at the Stockbridge Cemetery in Stockbridge, Massachusetts.

Their children were:

- David Dudley Field Jr. (1805–1894) was a US Congressman and law reformer.
- Emilia Ann Field Brewer (1807–1861), who married missionary Rev. Josiah Brewer
- Timothy Beals Field (1809–1836)
- Mathew Dickinson Field (1811–1870)
- Jonathan Edwards Field (1813–1868)
- Stephen Johnson Field (1816–1899) was an associate justice of the US Supreme Court.
- Cyrus West Field (1819–1892) was a business man and industrialist who led the effort to lay the first Atlantic telegraph cable.
- Henry Martyn Field (1822–1907) carried on in the family tradition becoming a clergyman and author.
- Mary Elizabeth Field (1823–1856)
