= Johann Stephan Decker =

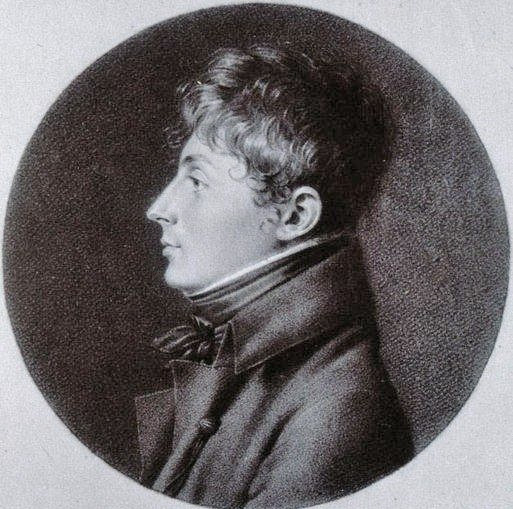
Jean Decker; portrait by Jean-Jacques Karpff

Johann Stephan Decker (Colmar, 1784 – Vienna, 1844) was an Alsatian French painter.

At the age of twenty he went to Paris, where he studied under Jacques-Louis David and Jean-Jacques Karpff, but at the end of seven years he returned to his native city. In 1821 he settled at Vienna, and was much employed at the court in teaching drawing and in the execution of miniatures and water-colour paintings.

He was the father of Georg Decker.
