= Dalrymple (name) =

Dalrymple is a surname, originating with the toponym of Dalrymple, East Ayrshire, Scotland. Used as a surname denoting origin since the 16th century, it was carried by the viscounts of Stair, East Ayrshire in the 17th century (earls of Stair since 1703). It also occurs as a commoners' surname since at least the 18th century. It has rarely been used as a given name since the later 18th century.

== Dalrymple Baronets ==
=== Baronets, of Stair (1664) ===
- James Dalrymple, 1st Viscount of Stair (1619–1695), created Viscount of Stair in 1690
- John Dalrymple, 1st Earl of Stair (1648–1707), initially 2nd Viscount of Stair, made 1st Earl of Stair in 1703

=== Earls of Stair (1703) ===
- John Dalrymple, 1st Earl of Stair (1648–1707), initially 2nd Viscount of Stair, made Earl of Stair in 1703
- John Dalrymple, 2nd Earl of Stair (1679–1747)
- James Dalrymple, 3rd Earl of Stair (died 1760)
- William Dalrymple-Crichton, 4th Earl of Stair (1699–1769)
- John Dalrymple, 5th Earl of Stair (1720–1789)
- John Dalrymple, 6th Earl of Stair (1749–1821)
- John Dalrymple, 7th Earl of Stair (1784–1840)
- John Dalrymple, 8th Earl of Stair (1771–1853)
- North Dalrymple, 9th Earl of Stair (1776–1864)
- John Dalrymple, 10th Earl of Stair (1819–1903)
- John Dalrymple, 11th Earl of Stair (1848–1914)
- John Dalrymple, 12th Earl of Stair (1879–1961)
- John Dalrymple, 13th Earl of Stair (1906–1996)
- John Dalrymple, 14th Earl of Stair (born 1961)

=== Baronets, of Bargeny (1697) ===
- Hew Dalrymple, Lord North Berwick, 1st Baronet (1653–1737)
- Sir Hew Dalrymple, 2nd Baronet (1712–1790)
- Sir Hew Dalrymple, 3rd Baronet (1746–1800)
- Sir Hew Dalrymple-Hamilton, 4th Baronet (1774–1834)
- Sir John Hamilton-Dalrymple, 5th Baronet (1780–1835)
- Sir Hew Hamilton-Dalrymple, 6th Baronet (1814–1887)
- Sir John Dalrymple, 7th Baronet (1824–1888)
- Sir Walter Hamilton-Dalrymple, 8th Baronet (1854–1920)
- Sir Hew Hamilton-Dalrymple, 9th Baronet (1888–1959)
- Sir Hew Hamilton-Dalrymple, 10th Baronet (born 1926)

=== Baronets, of Cranstoun (1698) ===
- Sir James Dalrymple, 1st Baronet (1650–1719)
- Sir John Dalrymple, 2nd Baronet (1682–1743)
- Sir William Dalrymple, 3rd Baronet (1704–1771)
- Sir John Dalrymple Hamilton, 4th Baronet (1726–1810)
- John Dalrymple, 8th Earl of Stair (1771–1853), succeeded as 8th Earl of Stair in 1840

=== Baronets, of Hailes, Midlothian (1701) ===
- Sir David Dalrymple, 1st Baronet (1665–1721)
- Sir James Dalrymple, 2nd Baronet (1692–1751)
- David Dalrymple, Lord Hailes 3rd Baronet (1726–1792)
- Sir James Dalrymple, 4th Baronet (died 1800)
- Sir John Pringle Dalrymple, 5th Baronet (died 1829)

=== Baronets, of High Mark (1815) ===
- Sir Hew Whiteford Dalrymple, 1st Baronet (1750–1830)
- Sir Adolphus Dalrymple, 2nd Baronet (1784–1866)

=== Baronets, of New Hailes (1887) ===
- Sir Charles Dalrymple, 1st Baronet (1839–1916)
- Sir David Dalrymple, 2nd Baronet (1879–1932)
- Sir Mark Dalrymple, 3rd Baronet (1915–1971)

== Surname ==
- Abner Dalrymple (1857–1939), American baseball player
- Alexander Dalrymple (1737–1808), Scottish geographer and the first Hydrographer of the British Admiralty
- Brian E. Dalrymple (born 1947), Canadian fingerprint scientist
- Bruce Dalrymple (born 1964), American basketball player
- Campbell Dalrymple (1725–1767), British military officer and Governor of Guadeloupe
- Clay Dalrymple (born 1936), American baseball player
- Farel Dalrymple (born 1972), American artist and alternative comics creator
- Frederick Dalrymple (1907–1988), birth name of Frederick Dalberg, English born South African opera singer
- Frederick Dalrymple-Hamilton (1890–1974), British naval officer
- George Elphinstone Dalrymple (1826–1876), Australian explorer, public servant and politician
- G. Brent Dalrymple (born 1937), American geologist
- Ian Dalrymple (1903–1989), British screenwriter, film director and producer
- Jack Dalrymple
  - Jack Dalrymple (musician), American member of musical band $wingin' Utter$
  - Jack Dalrymple (born 1948), 32nd Governor of North Dakota and businessman
- Jamie Dalrymple (born 1981), English cricketer
- Jerry Dalrymple, (1906–1962), All-American Football Player, Tulane University
- John Dalrymple
  - John Dalrymple (died 1742) (1699–1742), Member of Parliament for Wigtown Burghs, 1728–1734
  - John Dalrymple (physician) (1803–1852), English ophthalmologist
  - John Dalrymple (political writer) (1734–1779)
  - Sir John Charles Dalrymple-Hay (1821–1912), 3rd Baronet, was a Scottish Admiral and politician
  - John Hamilton Elphinstone Dalrymple (1819–1888), British Army general
- Learmonth White Dalrymple (c. 1827 – 1906), New Zealand educationalist
- Leona Dalrymple (1884–1968), American author
- Louis Dalrymple (1866–1905), American caricaturist
- Robert Dalrymple (1880–1970), Scottish footballer
- Sydney Dalrymple (1885–1969), Australian pilot
- William Dalrymple
  - William Dalrymple (historian) (born 1965), Scottish historian and writer
  - William Dalrymple (1678–1744), Scottish MP in the British Parliament
  - William Dalrymple (British Army officer) (1736–1807), Scottish soldier and MP in the British Parliament

=== Pseudonym ===
- Theodore Dalrymple, pen name of Anthony Daniels

=== Fictional characters ===
- Charlie Dalrymple, a fictional character in Brigadoon, a musical written by Alan Jay Lerner and Frederick Loewe
- Lady Dalrymple, a viscountess in Persuasion, a novel by Jane Austen
- Russell Dalrymple, portrayed by Bob Balaban, the fictional head of NBC in the sitcom Seinfeld
- The Honourable Daisy Dalrymple, an amateur detective in the book series by author Carola Dunn
- Burgundy Dalrymple, a fictional character in Skulduggery Pleasant, a book series by Derek Landy
- Larry Dalrymple, a fictional character in The Simpsons

== Given name ==
- Dalrymple Maitland (1848–1919), Isle of Man politician
- William Dalrymple Maclagan (1826–1910), Archbishop of York from 1891 to 1908
- Hew Dalrymple Ross (1779–1868), British soldier
- James Norman Dalrymple Anderson, University of London law academic

== See also ==
- Lady Dalrymple (disambiguation)
- Viscount of Dalrymple
- Dalrymple (disambiguation)
