= Earl of Dumfries =

Title in the Scottish peerage

Earldom of Dumfries
- Creation date: 12 June 1633
- Created by: Charles I
- Peerage: Peerage of Scotland
- First holder: William Crichton, 1st Earl of Dumfries
- Present holder: John Crichton-Stuart, 8th Marquess of Bute, 13th Earl of Dumfries
- Heir apparent: Lord John Crichton-Stuart
- Remainder to: heirs male bearing the name and arms of Crichton and, through a novadamus (amendment) issued on 3 November 1690, with the former precedency by which, failing himself and his grandson and the heirs male of the body of the latter, the remainder was extended to Penelope, eldest daughter of his son Charles, Lord Crichton, and the heirs of her body, succeeding to the family estates, and similarly to his son's other daughters, whom failing, to his son's nearest heirs whatsoever.
- Subsidiary titles: Lord Crichton of Sanquhar and Cumnock, Viscount of Ayr
- Former seats: Dumfries House, Sanquhar Castle
- Currently the Earldom resides with the Marquesses of Bute. However, the title, can be inherited through the female line through an amendment to the original creation and the title could be separated from the Marquesses of Bute should heirs presumptive to the titles of Bute and Dumfries be male and female, respectively, inherit.

Earl of Dumfries is a title in the Peerage of Scotland. It was originally created for William Crichton, 9th Lord Crichton of Sanquhar, in 1633, and stayed in the Crichton family until the death of the fourth countess in 1742, at which point the title passed to first the Dalrymple and then the MacDouall families before finally being inherited by the Marquesses of Bute, where it remains today.

The subsidiary titles of the Earl of Dumfries are: Viscount of Ayr and Lord Sanquhar (created 2 February 1622), Lord Crichton of Sanquhar (1488), and Lord Crichton of Cumnock (12 June 1633), all in the Peerage of Scotland.

== Family history ==
The traditional account of the origins of the Dumfries family are that they descended from a noble Hungarian that came to Scotland with Queen Margaret, in the during the reign of Malcolm III of Scotland.

The family origins are in Crichton, Midlothian. Thurstanus de Crichton was present at the charter of Holyrood Abbey alongside King David I in 1128.

Sanquhar Castle was built by Lord Crichton in the 13th century in the south west Scotland in the area of Dumfries and Galloway. The lord's descended to become the Earls of Dumfries, a title in the peerage of Scotland in 1633 for William Crichton, 1st Earl of Dumfries seventh Lord Crichton of Sanquhar; he was invested the viscount of Ayr on 2 February 1622, the earl of Dumfries, and Lord Crichton of Sanquhar and Cumnock, on 12 June 1633. William was also made the Earl of Menteith on 20 December that year. The Castle was sold Crichtons during the mid-1600s to the Duke of Queensberry. The castle a ruin, was bought in 1895 by John Crichton-Stuart, 3rd Marquess of Bute, a descendant of the Lord Crichton.

William, was the fifth earl of Dumfries, in 1721 he was commissioned in his uncle's 'Earl of Stair's regiment', and the 6th dragoons, he would continue to fight in the army until 1747. In 1742 he became the Earl following his Mother the Countess' death. During his military career he fought at the Battle of Dettingen as aide-de-camp to the Earl of Stair. Afterwards in 1744 he was appointed captain-lieutenant in the third regiment of footguards, during this period he was Sheriff of Clackmannan for the year 1742–47. In 1752 he was invested with the Order of the Thistle, and in 1760 he succeeded his brother James, as fourth earl of Stair, and was thenceforward styled earl of Dumfries and Stair. The Earl left a legacy in commissioning the Adams brothers, Robert, John and James, to design a new house to be called Leifnorris House. It was later that the name was to be changed to Dumfries House in line with his title. The house was completed on time and on budget in 1759. On 27 July 1768 he died at Dumfries House without an heir; his widow left to move to Edinburgh. He was succeeded in the title Earl of Dumfries by his nephew, Patrick Macdowall of Freugh; and the Earl of Stair went to his cousin, John Dalrymple.

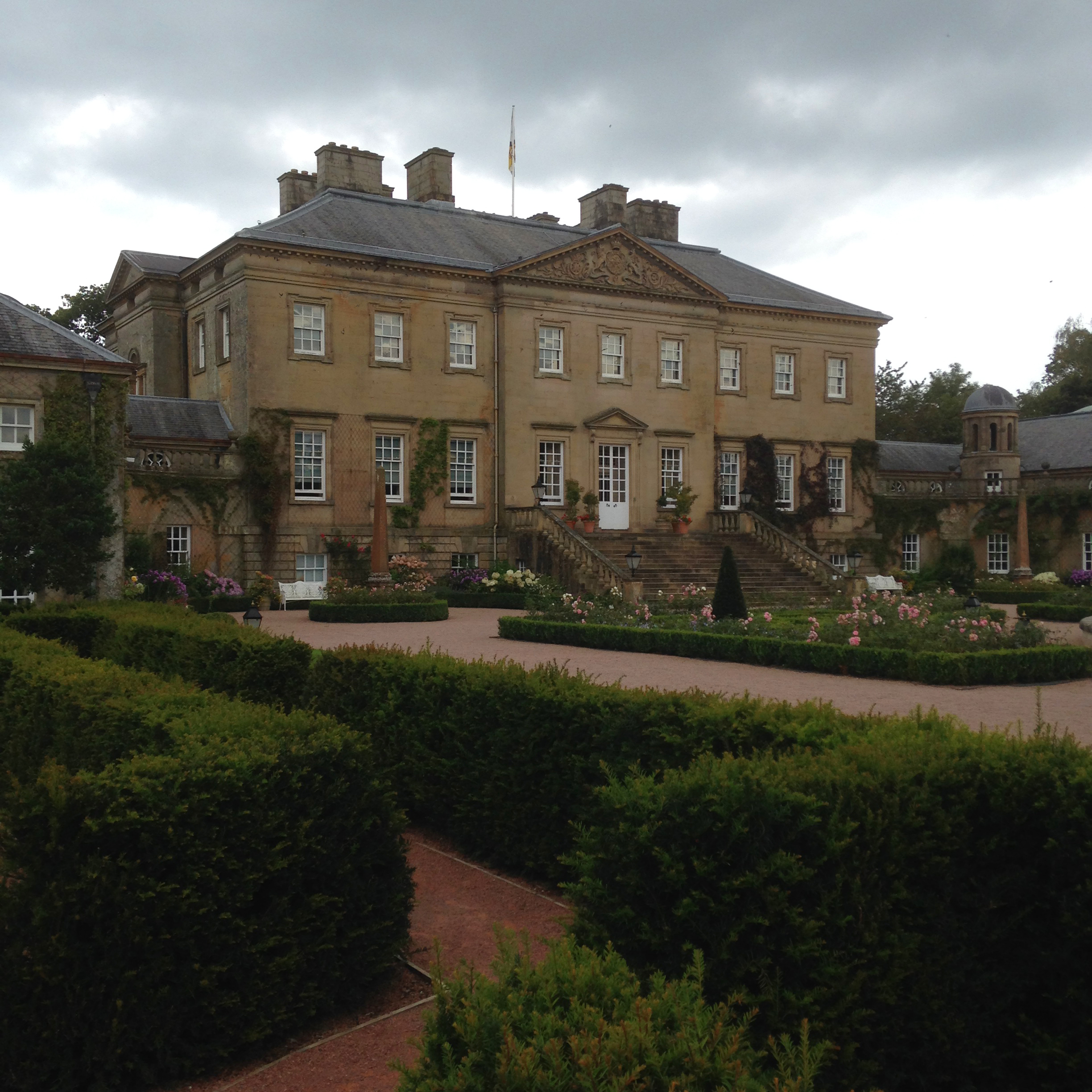
Dumfries house.

The Dumfries family seat was inherited by his nephew, Patrick McDouall-Crichton, 6th Earl of Dumfries (1726–1803). His daughter Lady Elisabeth Penelope married the John Stuart, Lord Mount Stuart, and was the grandmother of the 2nd Marquess of Bute, 7th Earl of Dumfries who merged the two titles of Dumfries and Bute. The subsequent 2nd, 3rd and 4th Marquess of Bute/7th, 8th and 9th Earls of Dumfries became involved in the coal mining industry in south Wales creating 2 gothic revival residences, Cardiff Castle and Castell Coch. The 10th Earl of Dumfries became involved with birds working as an ornithologist; he purchased the islands of St Kilda, leaving it to the National Trust for Scotland in 1956. The eleventh Earl of Dumfries became a scholar being having graduated from Trinity College, Cambridge, also becoming a fellow at the University of Edinburgh. A patron of the arts he held successive positions for decades, such as trustees and chairman on councils and boards in the United kingdom. He sold family's properties in Edinburgh and Cardiff to pay his father's death tax. The earl also took traditional roles as the Lord Lieutenant of Bute and of Argyll. The Earl's business had employed the most people on the Isle of Bute, a designer fabrics and contemporary furniture company.

One of the most important transitions fell to the 12th Earl. He was known as 'Johnny Dumfries' a Formula 1 race car driver featuring in the 1986 season. Dumfries House had been a family home from 1760 to 1993, when the last full-time occupant Lady Eileen, Dowager Marchioness of Bute, passed away. The house remained in the hands of the 7th Marquess of Bute who ensured that it was maintained, although not used as a primary residence, since then Charles, Prince of Wales bought Dumfries house to maintain its history by opening it to the public.

== Lords Crichton of Sanquhar (1488) ==
- Robert Crichton, 1st Lord Crichton of Sanquhar (d. 1494)
- Robert Crichton, 2nd Lord Crichton of Sanquhar (d. 1513)
- Robert Crichton, 3rd Lord Crichton of Sanquhar (?)
- Robert Crichton, 4th Lord Crichton of Sanquhar (d. 1536)
- William Crichton, 5th Lord Crichton of Sanquhar (d. 1550)
- Robert Crichton, 6th Lord Crichton of Sanquhar (d. 1561)
- Edward Crichton, 7th Lord Crichton of Sanquhar (d. 1569)
- Robert Crichton, 8th Lord Crichton of Sanquhar (d. 1612)
- William Crichton, 9th Lord Crichton of Sanquhar (1578–1643) (became Viscount of Ayr and Lord Sanquhar in 1622)

== Viscounts of Ayr (1622) ==
- William Crichton, 1st Viscount of Ayr (1578–1643)(became Earl of Dumfries and Lord Critchton of Cumnock in 1633)

== Earls of Dumfries (1633) ==
- William Crichton, 1st Earl of Dumfries (1578–1643)
- William Crichton, 2nd Earl of Dumfries (1598–1691); eldest son of the 1st Earl
- William Crichton, 3rd Earl of Dumfries (d. 1694); grandson of the 2nd Earl, died without issue
- Penelope Crichton, 4th Countess of Dumfries (d. 1742); sister of the 3rd Earl
- William Dalrymple-Crichton, 5th Earl of Dumfries, 4th Earl of Stair (1699–1769); eldest son of the 4th Countess, with no male heir, the Earldom of Stair passed to a cousin who was a grandson of the 1st Earl of Stair
  - Lady Elizabeth Dalrymple
- Patrick McDouall-Crichton, 6th Earl of Dumfries (1726–1803)
  - Lady Elizabeth Penelope McDouall-Crichton (1772–1797); only daughter and heir of the 6th Earl of Dumfries
- John Crichton-Stuart, 2nd Marquess of Bute and 7th Earl of Dumfries (1793–1848); only son of Lady Elizabeth McDouall-Crichton and grandson of the 6th Earl
- John Patrick Crichton-Stuart, 3rd Marquess of Bute and 8th Earl of Dumfries (1847–1900); only son of the 2nd Marquess and 8th Earl.
- John Crichton-Stuart, 4th Marquess of Bute and 9th Earl of Dumfries (1881–1947); eldest son of the 3rd Marquess and 9th Earl.
- John Crichton-Stuart, 5th Marquess of Bute and 10th Earl of Dumfries (1907–1956); eldest son of the 4th Marquess and 9th Earl.
- John Crichton-Stuart, 6th Marquess of Bute and 11th Earl of Dumfries (1933–1993); eldest son of the 5th Marquess and 10th Earl.
- John Colum Crichton-Stuart, 7th Marquess of Bute and 12th Earl of Dumfries (1958–2021); eldest son of the 6th Marquess and 11th Earl.
- John Bryson Crichton-Stuart, 8th Marquess of Bute and 13th Earl of Dumfries (b. 1989); eldest son of the 7th Marquess and 12th Earl.

The heir apparent to the Marquessate of Bute and all subsidiary titles is John, Earl of Dumfries (born 2024).

== Family Tree ==
Earls and Marquesses of Bute, Earls of Dumfries, Earls of Stair, and Earls of Windsor family tree

Lord Crichton of Sanquhar, 1488
William Crichton (d. 1550); 5th Lord Crichton of Sanquhar
Robert Crichton (d. 1561); 6th Lord Crichton of Sanquhar	Edward Crichton (d. 1569); 7th Lord Crichton of Sanquhar	William Crichton
Viscount of Ayr and Lord Sanquhar, 1622; Earl of Dumfries and Lord Crichton of Sanquhar and Cumnock; 1633
James Stuart; 1st Baronet d. 1662	Robert Crichton (d. 1612); 8th Lord Crichton of Sanquhar	William Crichton; 1578–1643; 1st Earl of Dumfries, etc. 9th Lord Crichton of Sanquhar
Baronet Dalrymple of Stair, 1664; Viscount of Stair and Lord Glenluce and Stranraer; 1690
Dugald Stuart; 2nd Baronet d. 1670	William Crichton; 1598–1691; 2nd Earl of Dumfries, etc. 10th Lord Crichton of Sanquhar	James Dalrymple; 1619–1695; 1st Viscount of Stair, etc.
Earl of Bute, Viscount of Kingarth, and Lord Mount Stuart, Cumra and Inchmarnock, 1703	Earl of Stair, Viscount of Dalrymple and Lord Newliston, Glenluce and Stranraer, 1703	Dalrymple Baronet of Cranstoun, 1698
James Stuart; 1661–1710; 1st Earl of Bute, etc.	Charles Chricton styled Lord Crichton	John Dalrymple; 1648–1706/1707; 1st Earl of Stair, etc. 2nd Viscount of Stair, etc.	James Dalrymple d. 1719; 1st Dalrymple Baronet of Cranstoun
James Stuart d. 1722/1723; 2nd Earl of Bute, etc.	John Dalrymple; 1673–1747; 2nd Earl of Stair, etc. 3rd Viscount of Stair, etc.	Penelope Crichton; 1682–1741/1742 suo jure 4th Countess of Dumfries, etc. 12th Lady Crichton of Sanquhar	William Dalrymple; 1678–1744	William Crichton d. 1694; 3rd Earl of Dumfries, etc. 11th Lord Crichton of Sanquhar	George Dalrymple; 1680-1745	John Dalrymple d. 1743; 2nd Dalrymple Baronet of Cranstoun
John Stuart; 1713–1792; 3rd Earl of Bute, etc. m. Mary Montagu (1718–1794), 1st Baroness Mount Stuart of Wortley, (GB 1761)	Elizabeth Crichton Dalrymple	James Dalrymple d. 1760; 3rd Earl of Stair, etc. 4th Viscount of Stair, etc.	William Dalrymple-Crichton; 1699–1768; 5th Earl of Dumfries, etc. 4th Earl of Stair, etc. 5th Viscount of Stair, etc. 12th Lord Crichton of Sanquhar	John Dalrymple; 1720–1789; 5th Earl of Stair, etc. 6th Viscount of Stair, etc.	William Dalrymple; 1736–1807	William Dalrymple; 1704–1771; 3rd Dalrymple Baronet of Cranstoun
Baron Cardiff, of Cardiff Castle in the County of Glamorgan, 1776; Marquess of Bute, Earl of Windsor and Viscount Mountjoy (3rd creation); 1796
John Stuart; 1744–1814; 1st Marquess of Bute, etc. 4th Earl of Bute, etc., 2nd Baron Mount Stuart of Wortley	Patrick McDouall-Crichton; 1726–1803; 6th Earl of Dumfries, etc. 13th Lord Crichton of Sanquhar	John Dalrymple; 1749–1821; 6th Earl of Stair, etc. 7th Viscount of Stair, etc.	John Dalrymple-Hamilton-Makgill; 1726–1810; 4th Dalrymple Baronet of Cranstoun
Baron Oxenfoord, of Cousland in the County of Edinburgh, 1841
John Stuart; 1767–1794 styled Viscount Mount Stuart	Elizabeth Penelope McDouall-Crichton; 1772–1797	John William Henry Dalrymple; 1784–1840; 7th Earl of Stair, etc. 8th Viscount of Stair, etc.	John Hamilton Dalrymple; 1771–1853; 8th Earl of Stair, etc. 9th Viscount of Stair, etc. 5th Baronet Dalrymple; 1st Baron Oxenfoord	North Hamilton Dalrymple; 1776–1864; 9th Earl of Stair, etc. 10th Viscount of Stair, etc. 2nd Baron Oxenfoord; 6th Dalrymple Baronet of Cranstoun
John Crichton-Stuart; 1793–1848; 2nd Marquess of Bute, etc. 5th Earl of Bute, etc. 7th Earl of Dumfries, etc. and Baronet Stuart of Bute; 14th Lord Crichton of Sanquhar; 3rd Baron Mount Stuart of Wortley	John Hamilton Dalrymple; 1819–1903; 10th Earl of Stair, etc. 11th Viscount of Stair, etc. 3rd Baron Oxenfoord; 7th Dalrymple Baronet of Cranstoun
John Patrick Crichton-Stuart; 1847–1900; 3rd Marquess of Bute, etc. 6th Earl of Bute, etc. 8th Earl of Dumfries, etc. and Baronet Stuart of Bute; 15th Lord Crichton of Sanquhar; 4th Baron Mount Stuart of Wortley, Cumra and Inchmarnock	John Hew North Gustav Henry Hamilton-Dalrymple; 1848–1914; 11th Earl of Stair, Viscount Dalrymple, and Lord Newliston; 12th Viscount of Stair, etc. 4th Baron Oxenfoord, Glenluce and Stranraer; 8th Dalrymple Baronet of Cranstoun
John Patrick Crichton-Stuart; 1881–1947; 4th Marquess of Bute, etc. 7th Earl of Bute, etc. 9th Earl of Dumfries, etc. and Baronet Stuart of Bute; 16th Lord Crichton of Sanquhar; 5th Baron Mount Stuart of Wortley	John James Hamilton Dalrymple; 1879–1961; 12th Earl of Stair, etc. 13th Viscount of Stair, etc. 5th Baron Oxenfoord; 9th Dalrymple Baronet of Cranstoun
John Crichton-Stuart; 1907–1956; 5th Marquess of Bute, etc. 10th Earl of Dumfries, etc. and Baronet Stuart of Bute; 8th Earl of Bute, etc. 17th Lord Crichton of Sanquhar; 6th Baron Mount Stuart of Wortley	John Aymer Dalrymple; 1906–1996; 13th Earl of Stair, etc. 14th Viscount of Stair, etc. 6th Baron Oxenfoord; 10th Dalrymple Baronet of Cranstoun
John Crichton-Stuart; 1933–1993; 6th Marquess of Bute, etc. 9th Earl of Bute, etc. 11th Earl of Dumfries, etc. 11th Baronet Stuart of Bute; 18th Lord Crichton of Sanquhar; 7th Baron Mount Stuart of Wortley
John Colum Crichton-Stuart; 1958–2021; 7th Marquess of Bute, etc. 10th Earl of Bute, etc. 12th Earl of Dumfries, etc. 19th Lord Crichton of Sanquhar; 8th Baron Mount Stuart of Wortley	Anthony Crichton-Stuart b. 1961	John David James Dalrymple b. 1961; 14th Earl of Stair, etc. 15th Viscount of Stair, etc. 7th Baron Oxenfoord; 11th Dalrymple Baronet of Cranstoun
Caroline Crichton-Stuart b. 1984	John Bryson Crichton-Stuart b. 1989; 8th Marquess of Bute, etc. 11th Earl of Bute, etc. 13th Earl of Dumfries, etc. and Baronet Stuart of Bute; 20th Lord Crichton of Sanquhar; 9th Baron Mount Stuart of Wortley	Arthur Alec Crichton-Stuart b. 2001	John James Thomas Dalrymple b. 2008 styled Viscount Dalrymple; Heir apparent to the Earldom of Stair

== See also ==
- Marquess of Bute
- Earl of Stair
