= John Dalrymple =

John Dalrymple may refer to:

== Nobles ==
- John Dalrymple, 1st Earl of Stair (1648–1707), Scottish noble
- John Dalrymple, 2nd Earl of Stair (1673–1747), Scottish soldier and diplomat
- John Dalrymple, 5th Earl of Stair (1720–1789)
- John Dalrymple, 6th Earl of Stair (1749–1821)
- John Dalrymple, 7th Earl of Stair (1784–1840)
- John Dalrymple, 8th Earl of Stair (1771–1853), British soldier and politician
- John Dalrymple, 10th Earl of Stair (1819–1903), Scottish peer and politician
- John Dalrymple, 11th Earl of Stair (1848–1914), British army officer and nobleman
- John Dalrymple, 12th Earl of Stair (1879–1961), Scottish soldier and Conservative politician
- John Dalrymple, 13th Earl of Stair (1906–1996), British peer
- John Dalrymple, 14th Earl of Stair (born 1961), British politician
- Sir John Dalrymple, 4th Baronet (1726–1810), historian

== Others ==
- John Dalrymple (died 1742) (1699–1742), Member of Parliament for Wigtown Burghs, 1728–1734
- John Hamilton (1715–1796), Scottish politician born John Dalrymple, MP for Wigtown Burghs and Wigtownshire
- John Dalrymple (political writer) (1734–1779), Scottish writer
- John Dalrymple (Royal Navy officer) (1722–1798)
- John Dalrymple (physician) (1803–1852), English ophthalmologist
- John Hamilton Elphinstone Dalrymple (1819–1888), British Army general
- Jack Dalrymple (born 1948), current Governor of North Dakota
- Jack Dalrymple (musician), American musician
- John Dalrymple (cricketer) (born 1957), English cricketer
