= Arthur Cecil Champion =

British priest

The Reverend Arthur Champion
- Church: Church of England

Orders
- Ordination: 1913 (priest) by Edmund Knox

Personal details
- Born: 27 August 1889 Rutland, England
- Died: 31 January 1977 (aged 87) Sway, Hampshire, England
- Denomination: Anglicanism
- Spouse: Evelyn Helen Guilford (m. 1914)
- Education: Queens' College, Cambridge; Egerton Hall, Manchester

Arthur Cecil Champion (27 August 1889 – 31 January 1977) was an Anglican priest and British Army chaplain.

== Early life and education ==
Champion was born in Rutland, England, on 27 August 1889. He was the second son of the Rev. Arthur Champion and Ellen Mary Follett. He graduated from Queens' College, Cambridge with a B.A. in 1911 and an M.A. in 1923, and trained as a clergyman at Egerton Hall, Manchester.

== Ordained ministry ==
Champion was ordained as a deacon in 1912 and ordained as a priest in 1913 by Edmund Knox, Bishop of Manchester. He began his career as a curate: first at Saint James Church, Moss Side, from 1912 to 1914, and then at Longridge from 1914 to 1915.

Champion was made a Temporary Chaplain to the Forces in 1915. He was then given the vicarship of Christ Church Portsdown in Waterlooville, which he held from 1916 to 1923. During this time, he was Headmaster of Boundary Oak School, an independent preparatory school in Fareham. He and his wife, Evelyn Helen Guilford, served as joint principals. This was followed by his appointment as vicar of Compton Gifford, Plymouth from 1923 to 1929, and Christ Church, Clifton Down from 1929 to 1938.

From 1938 to 1951, he was the vicar of Hambleton. In appreciation of his thirteen years service, he was presented with a painting of the village church of St Peter's & St Paul's by Lady Taylor and Vice Admiral Bertram Watson. In sharing his thanks with the parishioners, Champion remarked that he was the first vicar over the last three hundred years to leave the parish for another living.

After serving as rector of South Perrott from 1951 to 1956, Champion retired from ministerial duties.
