= Augustin-Gustave de Franquetot de Coigny =

French soldier and aristocrat

Coat of Arms of the Franquetot de Coigny family

Augustin Louis Joseph Casimir Gustave de Franquetot, 3rd Duke of Coigny (4 September 1788 – 2 May 1865) was a French aristocrat and soldier.

== Early life ==
Franquetot was born in 1800 into the prominent Franquetot family. He was the son of François Marie Casimir de Franquetot, Marquis of Coigny (1756–1816), and Louise Gabrielle de Conflans (1743–1825). The family lived in Scotland as Émigrés of the French Revolution.

Both of his grandfathers were prominent soldiers and Marshals of France. His maternal grandparents were Louis de Brienne de Conflans d'Armentières, Marquis of Armentières, and, his first wife, Adélaïde Jeanne Françoise de Bouterou d'Aubigny. His paternal grandparents were François-Henri de Franquetot de Coigny and Marie Jeanne de Bonnevie. His aunt, Antoinette Jeanne Françoise "Fanny" de Franquetot de Coigny, married Count Horace François Bastien Sébastiani de La Porta, parents of Françoise, Duchess of Praslin, who was believed to have been murdered by her husband, Charles de Choiseul, 5th Duke of Praslin in August 1847. While awaiting trial by the Chamber of Peers, the Duke committed suicide by arsenic. Following the Teste–Cubières political corruption scandal revealed in May 1847, the affair only added to the popular discontent with the July Monarchy which culminated in the French Revolution of 1848.

Three brothers from the Guillotte family bought the fiefdom of Franquetot, on the Cotentin Peninsula in Normandy, in 1528. Their descendants took the surname de Franquetot and bought the neighboring fiefdom of Coigny in 1577, where they built the Château de Franquetot in 1598. In the 1720s, the château was enlarged and renovated by the Marquis of Coigny in the 1720s.

== Career ==
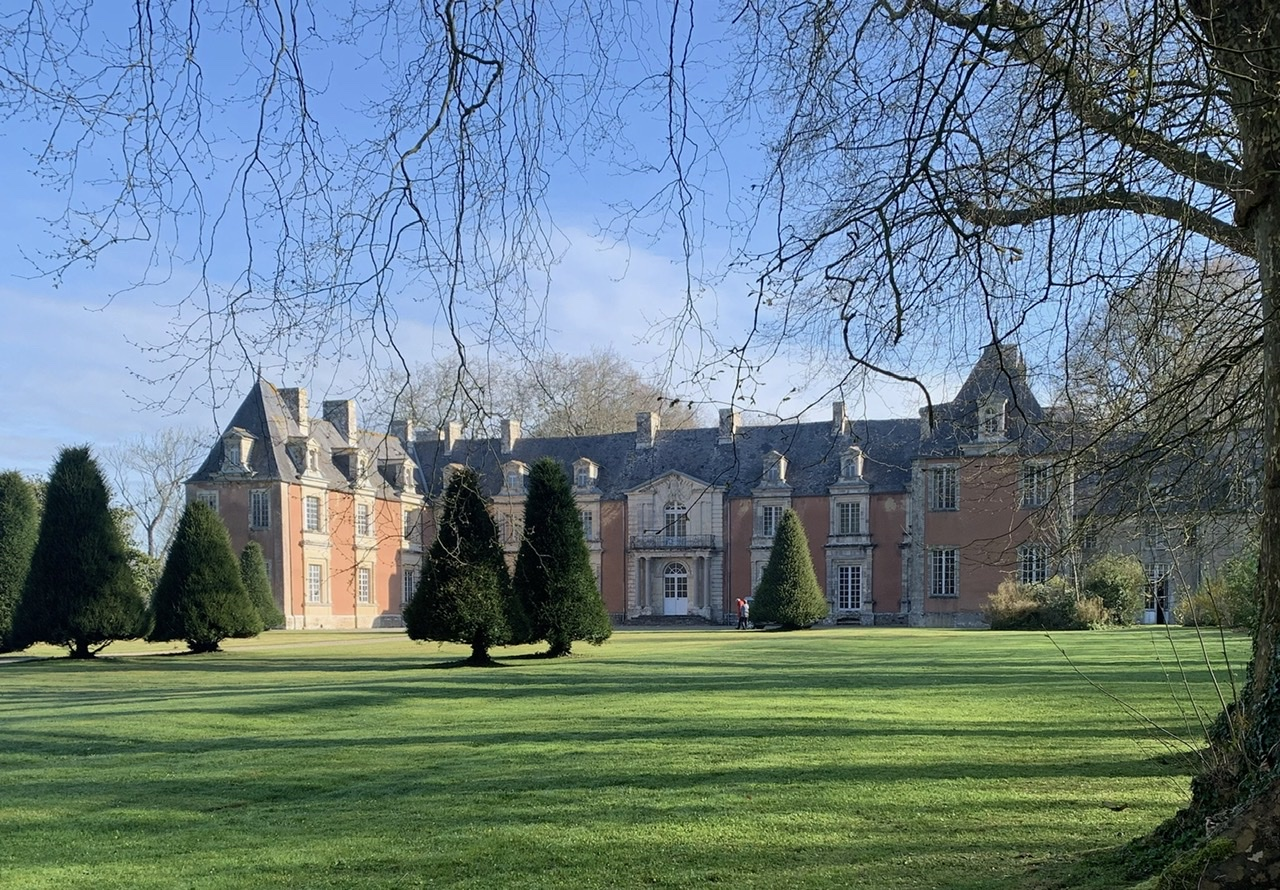
The Château de Franquetot

In 1810, Franquetot kept a diary during his time on military service in Spain during the Napoleonic Wars.

As his father predeceased his grandfather, he became 3rd Duke of Coigny upon his grandfather's death on 19 May 1821. Similarly, his grandfather had inherited the dukedom upon the death of his grandfather, François de Franquetot, 1st Duke of Coigny (created 1747), in 1759, as his father, Jean, Marquis de Coigny, had been killed in a duel against Louis Auguste de Bourbon, Prince of Dombes in 1748.

== Personal life ==
On 16 June 1822, Coigny married Henrietta Dundas Dalrymple-Hamilton (1801–1869), the daughter of Sir Hew Dalrymple-Hamilton, 4th Baronet and Hon. Jane Duncan (a daughter of Admiral Adam Duncan, 1st Viscount Duncan). Together, they were the parents of:

- Louisa Jane Henrietta Emily de Franquetot (1824–1896), who married her cousin, John Hamilton Dalrymple, 10th Earl of Stair, eldest son of North Dalrymple, 9th Earl of Stair.
- Georgiana Jane Elizabeth Fanny de Franquetot (1826–1910), who married Sydney Pierrepont, 3rd Earl Manvers, son of Charles Pierrepont, 2nd Earl Manvers and Mary Letitia Eyre, in 1852.

The Duke of Coigny died on 2 May 1865. Upon his death without male issue, the dukedom became extinct. His widow died in December 1869.

=== Descendants ===
Through his eldest daughter, he was a grandfather of eight, including John Dalrymple, 11th Earl of Stair, Lady Jane Georgina Dalrymple (wife of Sir Arthur Vivian), Lady Anne Henrietta Dalrymple (wife of Major-Gen. William Vesey Brownlow), and Hon. Sir Hew Hamilton Dalrymple.

Through his second daughter, he was a grandfather of five, including Lady Emily Annora Charlotte Pierrepont (wife of Frederick Lygon, 6th Earl Beauchamp), Charles Pierrepont, 4th Earl Manvers, and Hon. Evelyn Henry Pierrepont (father of the 6th Earl Manvers).

== See also ==
- List of French dukedoms

French nobility
Preceded by François-Henri de Franquetot de Coigny	Duke of Coigny; 1821–1865	Extinct
