= Dalrymple =

Dalrymple may refer to:

- Dalrymple (name), a surname and given name of Scottish origin
- Dalrymple baronets, holders of baronetcies created for people with the surname Dalrymple
- HMS Dalrymple (K427), frigate of the British Royal Navy
- Dalrymple's sign, a medical condition of the eyes associated with goitre

== Places ==
- Mount Dalrymple, an Antarctic mountain

=== Australia ===
- Dalrymple, Queensland, the first inland town in northern Australia
  - Dalrymple National Park, in Northern Queensland
  - Electoral district of Dalrymple, Queensland, Australia
  - Mount Dalrymple, Queensland, mountain in Queensland
  - Shire of Dalrymple, former local government area in Northern Queensland
- Port Dalrymple, name given to the mouth of the Tamar River in what is now George Town, Tasmania in 1798
  - Port Dalrymple School, is a K-10 school in George Town, Tasmania
- Hundred of Dalrymple, land division in South Australia

=== Scotland ===
- Dalrymple, East Ayrshire, a small ex-mining village near the west coast of Scotland, in the Parish of Dalrymple
- Dalrymple, South Ayrshire, the part of the Parish of Dalrymple which falls in the adjacent South Ayrshire council area

== See also ==
- Kate Dalrymple, a piece in the Scottish traditional music repertoire
- Lady Dalrymple (disambiguation)
