= North Dalrymple-Hamilton (British Army officer) =

British Army officer (1875–1949)

Sir North Dalrymple-Hamilton
- 2nd Lt. North Dalrymple-Hamilton, Scots Guards, 1902
- Born: North Victor Cecil Dalrymple-Hamilton; 19 March 1883; Westminster, London, England
- Died: 16 February 1953 (aged 69); Girvan, South Ayrshire, Scotland
- Relatives: John Dalrymple, 10th Earl of Stair (grandfather); Sir Frederick Dalrymple-Hamilton (brother); North Dalrymple-Hamilton (nephew)
- Military career
- Allegiance: United Kingdom
- Branch: British Army
- Service years: 1902–1953
- Rank: Colonel
- Units: Scots Guards; Territorial Army
- Conflicts: World War I World War II
- Awards: Royal Victorian Order; Order of the Bath; Order of Saint John of Jerusalem

Colonel Sir North Victor Cecil Dalrymple-Hamilton of Bargany KCVO CB OStJ JP DL (19 March 1883 – 16 February 1953) was a Scottish aristocrat, British Army officer, and writer. He was adjutant of the Royal Company of Archers from 1929 until his death.

== Early life and education ==
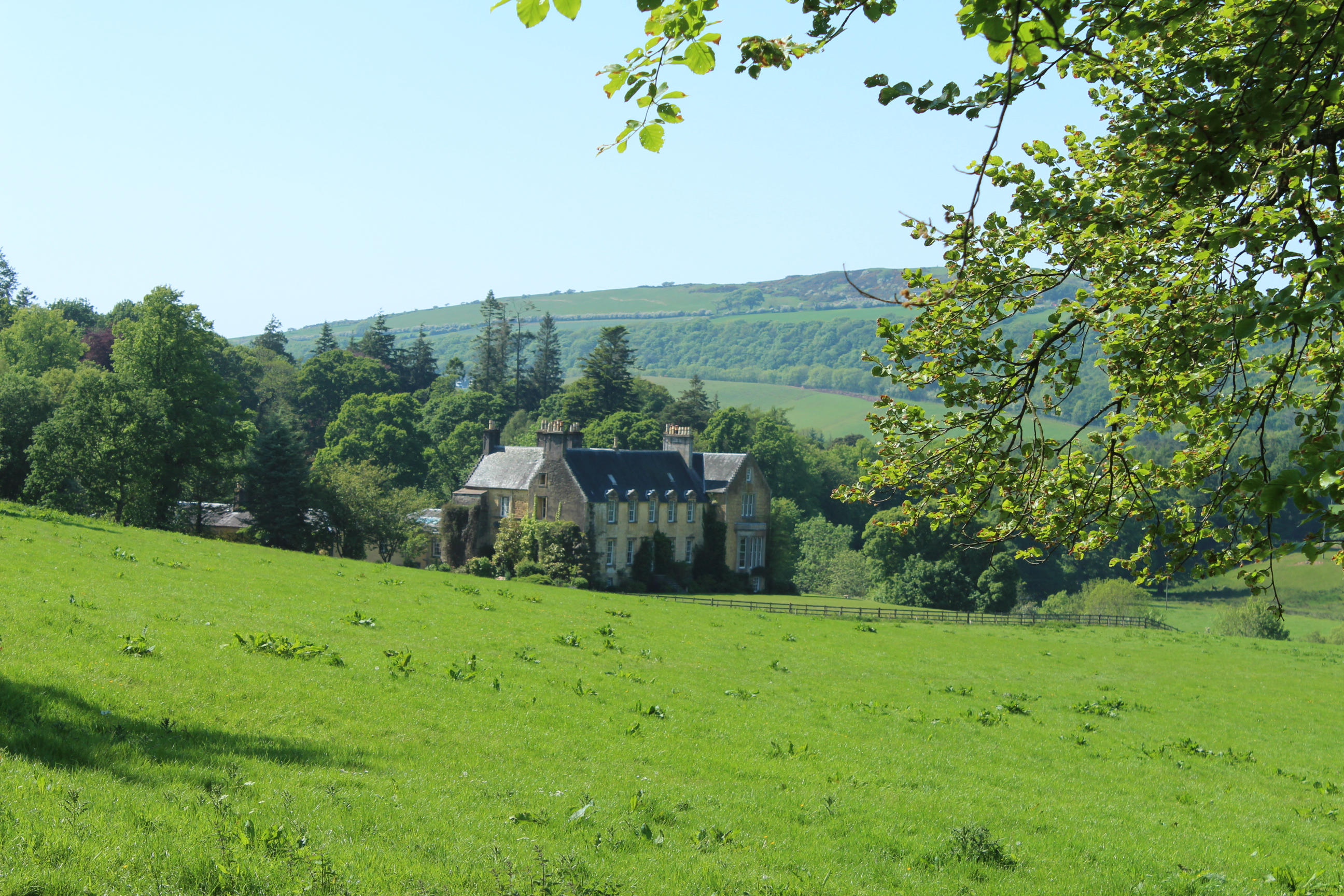
Bargany House, Ayrshire, the Dalrymple family seat

Dalrymple-Hamilton was born at 4 St James's Square, Westminster, the eldest son of Hon. North de Coigny Dalrymple-Hamilton of Bargany (1853–1906), the second son of John Dalrymple, 10th Earl of Stair. His mother was Marcia Kathleen Anne Liddell, daughter of Sir Adolphus Liddell and Frederica Lane-Fox, and granddaughter of George Lane-Fox MP. His younger brother was Admiral Sir Frederick Dalrymple-Hamilton (1890–1974).

Dalrymple-Hamilton was educated at Eton College and the Royal Military College, Sandhurst.

== Career ==
Dalrymple-Hamilton was gazetted to the Scots Guards in 1902. As he succeeded his father in 1906 as laird of Bargany in the village of Dailly, South Ayrshire, he spent most of his career on the reserve officers list, with the exception of the First World War. He was a member of the Ayrshire Territorial Force Association since its inception in 1908 and served both as vice-chairman and chairman.

He served as adjutant of the London District School of Instruction and of the 1st Battalion, Scots Guards. During the First World War, he served part of the time as adjutant of Sandhurst.

During the Second World War, he served as liaison officer between the British Army in Scotland and the Home Guard. In 1928, he was appointed adjutant of the Royal Company of Archers, The King's Bodyguard for Scotland. He was promoted ensign of that unit in 1942, lieutenant in 1948, and captain in 1952.

== Honours ==
Dalrymple-Hamilton was appointed a Member of the Royal Victorian Order (MVO) in the 1919 New Year Honours. and promoted to a Commander of the order (CVO) in 1937. He was knighted in the same order (KCVO) in the 1952 New Year Honours.

He was appointed an Officer of the Order of the Hospital of Saint John of Jerusalem (OStJ) in 1948. He was appointed a Companion of the Order of the Bath (CB) in the 1949 New Year Honours.

== Personal life ==
In 1910, Dalrymple-Hamilton married Lady Marjorie Alice Coke, daughter of Thomas Coke, 3rd Earl of Leicester, at St Peter's Church, Eaton Square. They had no surviving children. Lady Marjorie died in 1946. Sir North died in 1953 at Bargany. His estates were inherited by his nephew and namesake, Cpt. North Dalrymple-Hamilton.

Sir North was both an avid salmon angler and diarist. His memoirs of fishing on the Altaelva in Norway were privately printed in 2009.

== Bibliography ==
- Dalrymple-Hamilton, Sir North (2009). Roy, Flury (ed.). Alten – Red Letter Days: The Salmon Fishing Diaries of Colonel Sir North Dalrymple-Hamilton. Cambridge, Massachusetts: Charles B. Wood III. p. 106. OCLC 1409337055.
- Dalrymple-Hamilton, Sir North (1905). A World View of Free Trade, Tariff Reform and the Empire's Duty to Mankind. Edinburgh: W. Blackwood and Sons. OCLC 1181198262.
