= Flag Officer Commanding, Iceland (C) =

- Ensign of the Royal Navy
- Admiralty
- Reports to: First Sea Lord
- Nominator: First Sea Lord
- Appointer: Prime Minister; Subject to formal approval by the King-in-Council
- Formation: 1941–1945

The Flag Officer Commanding, Iceland (C) was an appointment of the British Royal Navy during the Second World War. His headquarters were at the stone frigate HMS Baldur, based at Hvitanes, in Hvalfjörður fjord, on the west coast of Iceland. It was initially administered by the Admiral Commanding, Iceland (C), then as the Flag Officer Commanding, Iceland (C), from 1942 to 1945.

== History ==
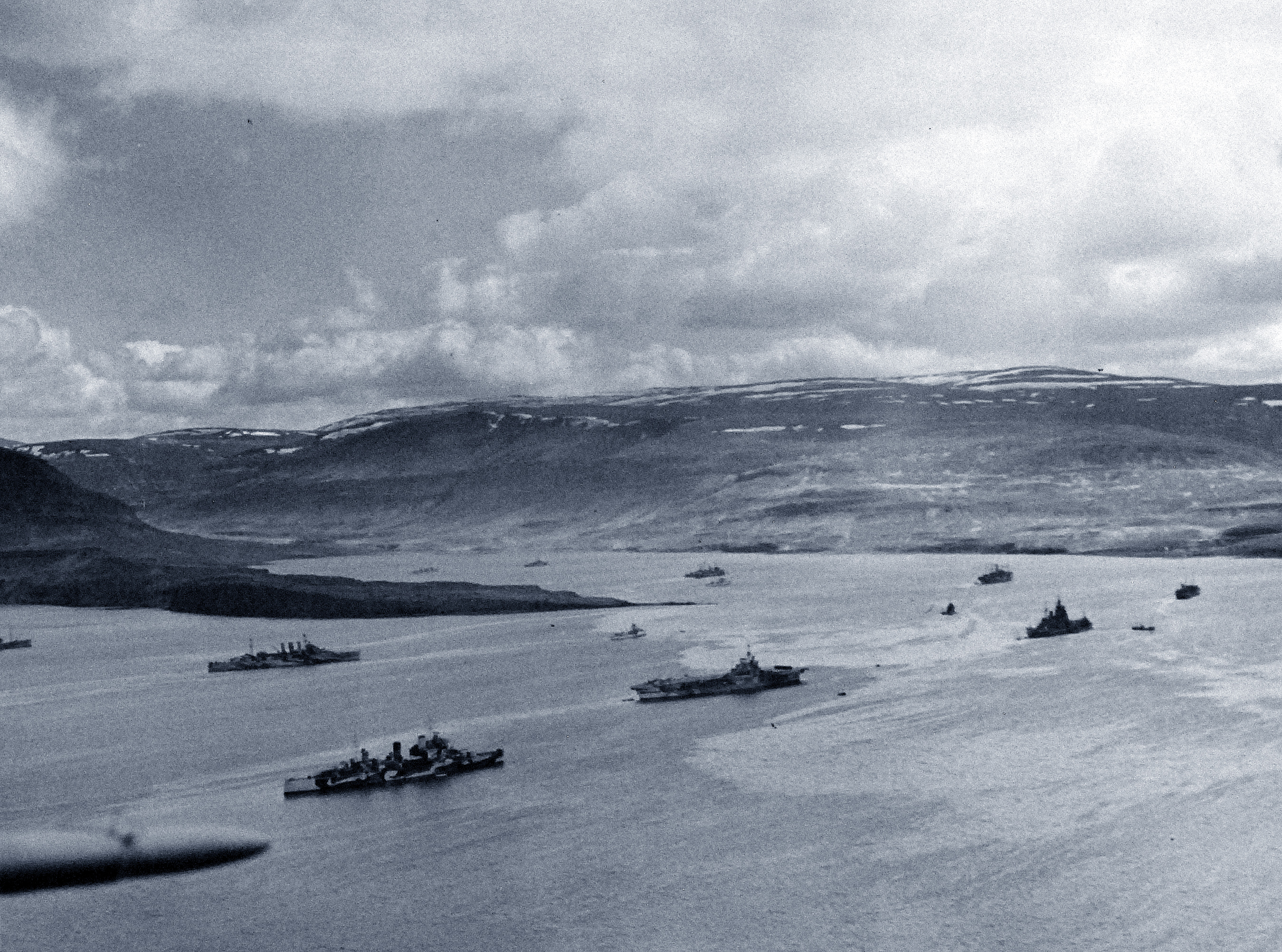
Escorts and merchant ships at Hvalfjord before the sailing of Convoy PQ 17, June 1942

Following the German invasion of Denmark in April 1940, Iceland, then in personal union with Denmark, declared neutrality throughout the rest of the war. Iceland's location was of strategic importance to the British who decided to station forces at a naval base called HMS Baldur at Hvitanes following the invasion of Iceland in May 1940. In addition there was also established an accounting and accommodation shore base called HMS Baldur II. Iceland was an important base for North Atlantic convoys, patrol and anti-submarine duties.

The Admiralty appointed a flag officer to administer the station. This was Rear Admiral Richard J.R. Scott, July 1940-September 1941. On 5 September 1941 Rear-Admiral Frederick Dalrymple-Hamilton was appointed as Admiral Commanding, Iceland, serving until August 1942.

Charles Eric Morgan served as Rear-Admiral Commanding Iceland [HMS Baldur (RN base, Reykjavik, Iceland)] from 12.09.1942 to 31 October 1943; he assumed command on 20 August 1942.

During the war Winston Churchill instructed British officers to refer to the country as Iceland (C) due to someone ordering a ship to go to Ireland instead of Iceland at the beginning of the war.

On 31 October 1943 Bertram Watson was appointed Flag Officer Commanding, Iceland, where he served in the rank of rear admiral until 7 August 1945. The 1945 Navy List records Watson as holding the position in the rank of vice admiral.
