= Lady Dalrymple =

Lady Dalrymple may refer to:

== People ==
- Viscountess of Dalrymple, see Viscount of Dalrymple
- Consort to one of the Dalrymple baronets
- Gentlewomen and aristocrats with the surname Dalrymple (name)

== Fictional characters ==
- Lady Dalrymple, a character from the 1817 Jane Austen novel Persuasion (novel)

== See also ==
- Dalrymple (disambiguation)
