= Bertram Watson =

Royal Navy officer (1887–1976)

Vice-Admiral Bertram Watson CB DSO
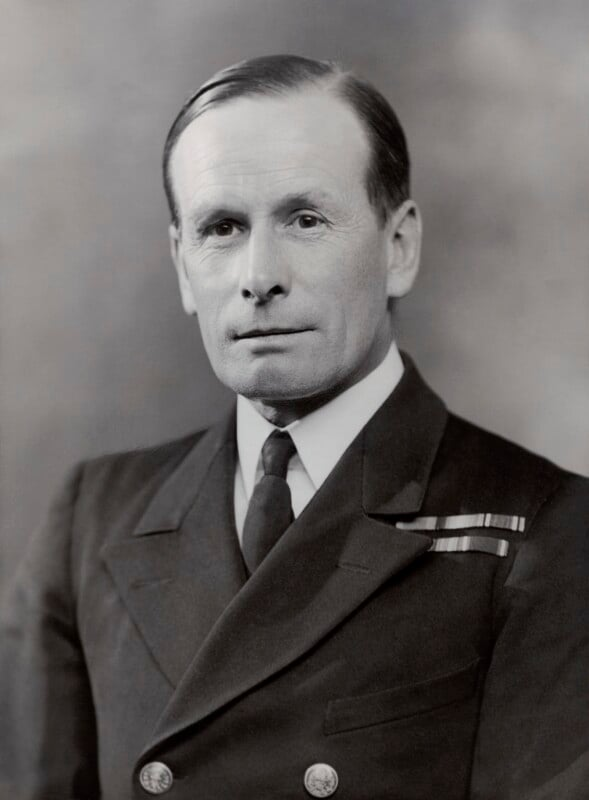
- Watson in 1936
- Born: 20 March 1887
- Died: 22 July 1976 (aged 89)
- Military career
- Allegiance: United Kingdom
- Branch: Royal Navy
- Rank: Vice-Admiral
- Commands: HMS Curlew; HMS Valiant
- Conflicts: World War I World War II
- Awards: Companion of the Order of the Bath; Distinguished Service Order

Vice-Admiral Bertram Chalmers Watson CB DSO (20 March 1887 – 22 July 1976) was a Royal Navy officer who became Rear Admiral, Submarines.

== Naval career ==
Watson served in the First World War and, after being promoted to captain on 31 December 1925, he became commanding officer of the cruiser HMS Curlew in July 1932 and of the battleship HMS Valiant in August 1933. He went on to become Rear Admiral, Submarines in December 1938 and, after seeing action in that role in the early stages of the Second World War, went on to be Flag Officer Greenock in January 1940 and Flag Officer Commanding, Iceland in October 1943.

== Later career ==
In 1951, Watson presented Arthur Cecil Champion with a painting of the village church of St. Peter's & St. Paul's in appreciation of his thirteen years as vicar of Hambleton.

Military offices
Preceded by Robert Raikes	Rear-Admiral Submarines; 1938–1940	Succeeded by Sir Max Horton
