= North Dalrymple-Hamilton =

Royal Navy officer (1922–2014)

Captain North Dalrymple-Hamilton CVO MBE DSC JP DL
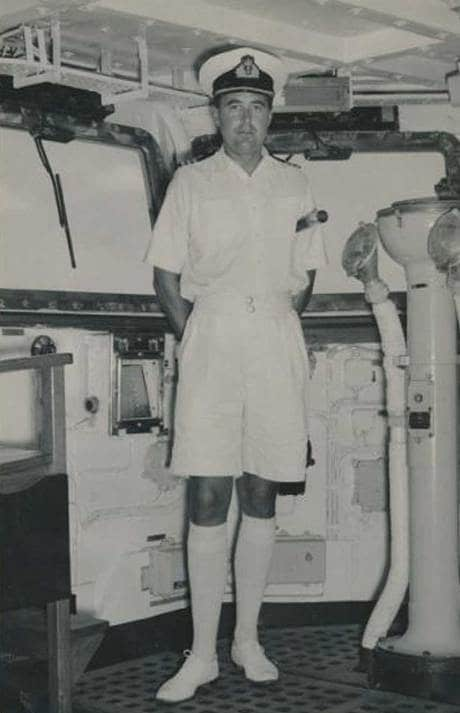
- Born: 17 February 1922; Devon, England
- Died: 8 July 2014 (aged 92); Ayr, Ayrshire, Scotland
- Spouse: Mary Helen Colville (m. 1949)
- Relatives: Sir Frederick Dalrymple-Hamilton (father); North Dalrymple-Hamilton (uncle)
- Military career
- Allegiance: United Kingdom
- Branch: Royal Navy
- Service years: 1939–1970
- Rank: Captain
- Commands: HMS Tenby; HMS Scarborough
- Conflicts: Second World War; Korean War
- Awards: Commander of the Royal Victorian Order; Member of the Order of the British Empire; Distinguished Service Cross

Captain North Edward Frederick Dalrymple-Hamilton of Bargany, CVO, MBE, DSC, JP, DL (17 February 1922 – 8 July 2014) was a Royal Navy officer of the Second World War who, as gun director of the battleship HMS King George V, witnessed the sinking of the Bismarck. His father, Frederick Dalrymple-Hamilton, was the commander of the battleship HMS Rodney nearby.

He was later executive officer of the Royal Yacht HMY Britannia from 1958 to 1960, and was appointed a Deputy Lieutenant of Ayrshire in 1973.

== Marriage and family ==
On 23 July 1949, Dalrymple-Hamilton married the Hon. Mary Helen Colville, daughter of the Baron Clydesmuir. The couple had two sons:

- (North) John Frederick Dalrymple-Hamilton OBE b. 7 May 1950
- James Hew Ronald Dalrymple-Hamilton b. 4 Dec 1955.

Their older son John was a page of honour to the Queen Mother and to Queen Elizabeth II. He later followed his father in serving as Vice Lord-Lieutenant of Ayrshire and Arran.
