= François-Henri de Franquetot de Coigny =

Marshal of France

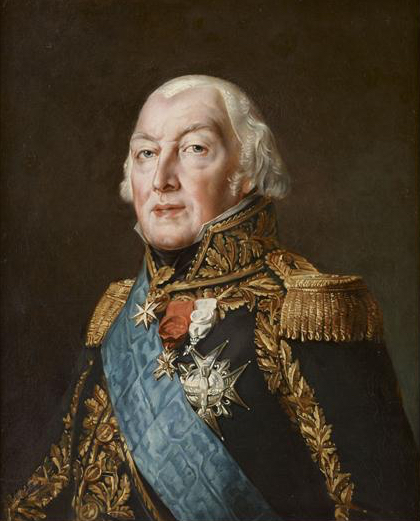

Governor of Les Invalides
- In office 1816–1821
- Preceded by: Jean Mathieu Philibert Sérurier
- Succeeded by: Louis-Antoine de Lignaud de Lussac

Personal details
- Born: François-Henri de Franquetot de Coigny; 28 March 1737 Paris, France
- Died: 19 May 1821 (aged 84) Paris, France
- Spouse: Marie Jeanne de Bonnevie
- Relations: François de Franquetot de Coigny (grandfather); Françoise, duchesse de Praslin (granddaughter)
- Parent(s): Jean, Marquis de Coigny
- Awards: Marshal of France

Military service
- Allegiance: Kingdom of France; Portugal
- Battles/wars: Seven Years' War; Battle of Hastenbeck; Battle of Krefeld; Battle of Minden; French Revolutionary Wars

François-Henri de Franquetot de Coigny, duc de Coigny (28 March 1737 – 19 May 1821) was a Marshal of France.

== Early life ==
He was the son of Jean, Marquis de Coigny (1702–1748) and the grandson of François de Franquetot de Coigny, another Marshal of France. When he was eleven, his father was killed in a duel and at age fifteen, de Coigny entered the musketeers.

== Career ==
De Coigny first served in the Seven Years' War where as a cavalry general he took part in the conquest of Hanover. Having fought at Hastenbeck and Minden, he transferred to the army of the Count of Clermont under whom he served in the Battle of Krefeld.

Promoted to Colonel General of the Dragoons in 1771, the following year he was appointed Governor of Cambrai. In 1787 he was made a peer of France. When the French Revolution broke out De Coigny decided to emigrate. In 1791 he joined the émigré army with whom he served against the French Republic during the early stages of the French Revolutionary Wars. He commanded the Maison du Roi until its disbandment in 1792, after which he was charged by the Count of Provence with several diplomatic missions.

De Coigny entered Portuguese service thereafter and, following the abdication of Napoleon, ultimately returned to France. From 1816 to 1821 he was Governor of Les Invalides. In 1816, De Coigny was made a Marshal of France. He died on 19 May 1821.

== Marriage and issue ==
De Coigny was married to Marie Jeanne de Bonnevie. Together, they were the parents of a son and daughter:

- François Marie Casimir de Franquetot, marquis de Coigny (1756–1816), who married Louise Gabrielle de Conflans (1743–1825), a daughter of Louis de Brienne de Conflans d'Armentières.
- Jeanne-Françoise-Antoinette "Fanny" Franquetot de Coigny (1778–1807), who married Horace Sébastiani (later the French Minister of Foreign Affairs), in 1806. She died in childbirth while in Constantinople in 1807, a few days before Sultan Selim III was deposed. Sébastiani later married Aglaé-Angélique-Gabrielle de Gramont, the widow of Russian General Count Alexander Davidoff and a daughter of Héraclius, duc de Gramont.

=== Descendants ===
Through his only daughter, he was a grandfather of Françoise, duchesse de Praslin, who was believed to have been murdered by her husband, Charles de Choiseul, Duke of Praslin in August 1847. While awaiting trial by the Chamber of Peers, the Duke committed suicide by arsenic. Following hard on the heels of the Teste–Cubières political corruption scandal revealed in May 1847, the affair only added to the popular discontent with the July Monarchy which culminated in the French Revolution of 1848.

French nobility
Preceded by François de Franquetot de Coigny	Duke of Coigny; 1759–1821	Succeeded by Augustin-Gustave de Franquetot de Coigny
