= William Crichton, 2nd Earl of Dumfries =

2nd Earl of Dumfries

William Crichton
- Earl of Dumfries (1642/1643-1691); Viscount of Ayr (1642/1643-1691)
- Predecessor: William Crichton, 1st Earl of Dumfries
- Successor: William Crichton, 3rd Earl of Dumfries
- Died: 1691
- Spouse: Penelope Swift
- Issue: Robert; Charles; Elizabeth; Penelope; Mary
- Father: William Crichton, 1st Earl of Dumfries
- Mother: Euphemia Seton

William Crichton PC (1598–1691) was the 2nd Earl of Dumfries and a privy councillor to Charles II of England. After the Glorious Revolution, Crichton resigned his titles on 10 September 1690 and had them restored on 3 November 1690 by the new King William III of England. Although he produced two sons, they both pre-deceased William, so his titles passed to his grandson William.

At the time of Crichton's birth, his family owned a large number of estates in the area around Sanquhar, but due to financial problems caused in part by a large celebration thrown in 1617 for the visiting King James VI, by 1642 the family had sold their Sanquar properties and moved to Cumnock.

In 1686 the body of covenanter Alexander Peden was exhumed by troops from Sorn Castle and brought to Cumnock to be posthumously hung. At the behest of his wife, Crichton prevented the troops from hanging the body, telling them that "the gibbet was erected for malefactors and murderers, and not for such men as Peden".

== Family ==
On 29 August 1618, he married Penelope Swift, daughter of Sir Robert Swift, Sheriff of Yorkshire, and they produced two sons and three daughters.

- Robert (bap. 19 Dec 1641), died at a young age.
- Charles, Lord Crichton (d. bef. 11 March 1690), who in 1679 married Sarah the third daughter of James Dalrymple, 1st Viscount of Stair. They produced one son and four daughters. The son William became the 3rd Earl of Dumfries, and upon his death having produced no heirs, his sister Penelope inherited the title as Countess of Dumfries.
- Elizabeth, who in January 1658 married Alexander Montgomerie, later 8th Earl of Eglinton.
- Penelope, who died unmarried.
- Mary (bap. 15 Feb 1644), who died unmarried.

Peerage of Scotland
| Preceded by William Crichton | Earl of Dumfries; 1643–1691 | Succeeded by William Crichton |
