= Boughton Hall =

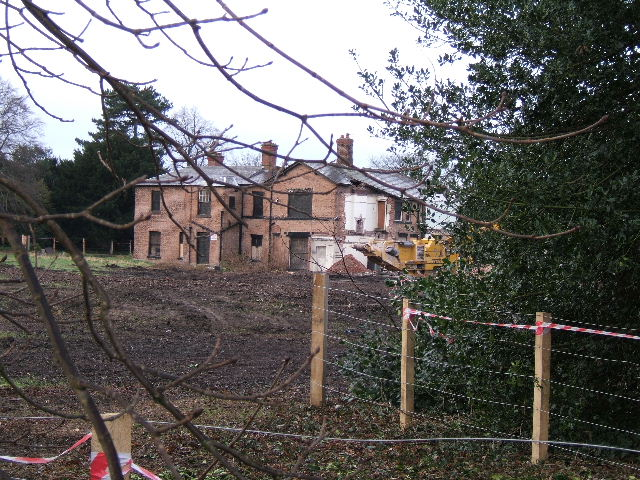
- Boughton Hall being refurbished

- Location in Cheshire
- 53.1902°N 2.8624°W
- Location: Boughton, Chester, Cheshire, England
- OS grid reference: SJ 425 662

Site notes
- Architectural style: Georgian

Listed Building – Grade II
- Designated: 10 January 1972
- Reference no.: 1375793

Boughton Hall is a former country house in Boughton, to the east of the city of Chester, Cheshire, England. It is designated by English Heritage as a Grade II listed building.

== History ==
The original house on the site is thought to have been built before 1579. This house was destroyed by fire in 1643 during the Civil War. The house was then rebuilt with an E-shaped plan. The area to the left of the entrance porch was filled in about 1800. More alterations were made in the 18th century, a wing was added in the 19th century, and further alterations were made during the 20th century.

It was owned by the Currie family from the 15th century and was occupied by Major-General William Vesey Brownlow in the late 19th century. Dr. John Joseph Tisdall and his wife, Emily Constance, were living at Boughton Hall at the times of their deaths in 1939. It was later used as a children's home, and then as an office for Barnardo's. It was redeveloped as the focal point of a retirement village in 2008.

== Architecture ==
Boughton Hall is constructed in brick with stone dressings, and has grey slate roofs. It is in two storeys, with a 19th-century wing to the left. The plan of the main part of the hall is E-shaped, with some infilling, plus an additional wing to the left. Its architectural style is Georgian. Three semicircular steps lead up to the central porch. The windows are sashes. The interior contains a fireplace carrying the date 1655, which is surrounded with tiles depicting biblical scenes.
