= Frederick Henry Harford =

- Born: Frederick Henry Harford; 20 March 1841
- Died: 12 August 1926 (aged 85); Down Place, Windsor, Berkshire
- Other name: Lummy
- Children: 2
- Military career
- Branch: Scots Fusilier Guards
- Parent(s): Frederick Paul Harford; Louisa Eliza Burke Hallifax

Frederick Henry Harford (20 March 1841 - 12 August 1926) was a British colonel. He was a direct descendant of the Lords Baltimore, proprietary governors of the Province of Maryland from 1631 until 1776.

== Early life ==
Frederick Henry Harford was born on Saturday, 20 March 1841, in the town of Leamington, to Louisa Eliza Burke Hallifax and Frederick Paul Harford. He was their second child, and only son. He had two sisters live to adulthood, Edith and Marian. They were the grandchildren of Henry Harford, the last proprietor of the Province of Maryland. His great-grandfather was Frederick Calvert, 6th Baron Baltimore, but since Calvert wasn't married to Hester Whelan when Henry was born, the Baron Baltimore ended with Frederick Calvert.

Deer hunts were an occurrence Harford would've been exposed to young, in December 1842 deer which were being tracked, crossed through the grounds of Down Place.

On 21 February 1860, when Harford was only 19-years old, his 57-year old father Frederick Paul Harford committed suicide. Frederick Paul was found after 4 PM, by a gardener on the Harford estate of Down Place. His body was laying in a pool of blood, along the River Thames near Monkey Island. "It appeared that in a sitting posture he must have discharged a loaded pistol by the left ear, as a portion of his skull on that side of the head was blown away, and his hat was picked up about sixteen yards from the body."

== Career ==
On 13 January 1860, it was reported Harford had followed his father's career path and joined the Scots Guards. By purchase he moved through the ranks from an Ensign, to Lieutenant. In 1864, he was promoted to captain.

In March 1865, Harford was recognized at a Levée held by Queen Victoria, after being submitted by General Sir Alexander Woodford.

Harford retired with half-pay from the Scots Guard on 1 October 1881.

In 1888, Harford reached out to the Maryland Historical Society and sold nearly 1000 original documents pertaining to the creation of the Province of Maryland. The documents were reportedly found by Harford in an Orangery.

== Personal life ==
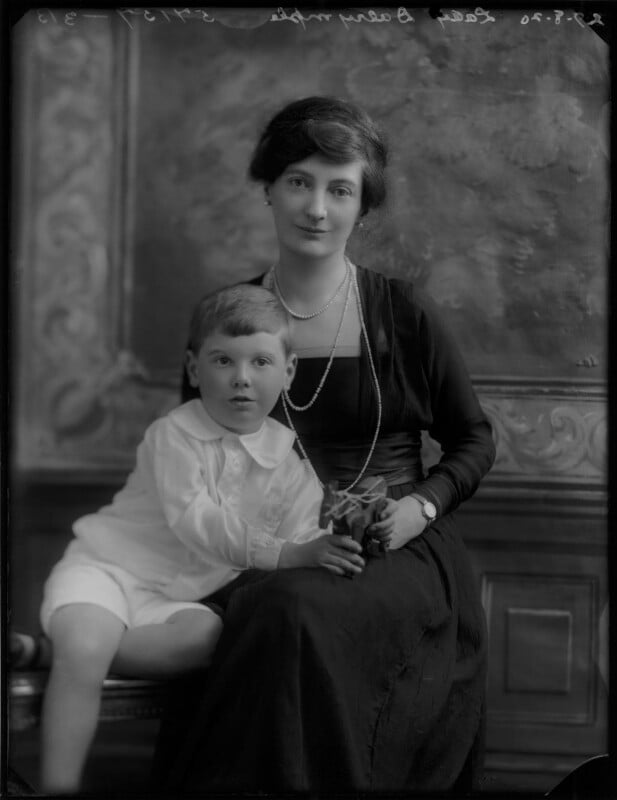
Violet Evelyn Dalrymple (née Harford), Countess of Stair; John Aymer Dalrymple, 13th Earl of Stair

Frederick Henry Harford married Florence Helen Isabella Parson (26 December 1853 - 29 June 1931), the granddaughter of the Lawrence Parsons, 2nd Earl of Rosse, on 21 March 1881. They had 2 children: Frederick Reginald Harford (30 March 1882 - 17 March 1955) who married Maude Isabel Lardelli in 1916, and Violet Evelyn Harford (1883 - 22 February 1968) who married John Dalrymple, 12th Earl of Stair. Violet and John's son, John Dalrymple, 13th Earl of Stair, went on to marry Davina Katherine Bowes-Lyon, the daughter of David Bowes-Lyon, and niece to Queen Elizabeth The Queen Mother. Violet and John were also the parents of Lady Jean Rankin.

In 1905, his son at 21-years old, and while living at Down Place was fined for failing to produce his driver's license when driving a motorcar on the highway on 24 April.

In the summer of 1906, Frederick Reginald was stationed with the Scots Guards at Aldershot. On the afternoon of Sunday 12 August, Frederick Reginald was returning on his motorcycle from the Guards' Club at Maidenhead. He drove up Bracknell-road and turned onto the main London and Aldershot road. At the corner, or soon after, he came into collision with a motorcar. He was severely injured in the collision and was dragged, "along the road for about twenty yards." He was taken into a neighbouring hotel, and a doctor was called, who found him suffering from severe shock, long and deep wounds in his head and groin while his left leg was broken in six places. After lying there for some days he was removed to a nursing home and an operation was performed on the injured leg. He was afterwards taken to King Edward VII's Hospital. He was incapacitated until July 1907, when he was able to walk again he rejoined his regiment.

In 1908, a lawsuit was brought forth against Alice Jane Hubbard for damages for personal injuries received owing to the alleged negligence of the defendant's chauffeur. Frederick Henry was present for the court case and openly objected before the court to statements made by Justice Charles Darling, 1st Baron Darling. Frederick Reginald was asked, "had you promised your father to give up motor-cycling?" to which he replied, "[My father] seemed to object to my riding, but I do not know why." He later, "added that his father said he thought motor-cycles were dangerous." In the end, Hubbard agreed to pay £500 for the "out of pocket expenses, which the plaintiff said he had had to incur by reason of the accident."
