= Robert Crichton, 8th Lord Crichton of Sanquhar =

Scottish peer executed for the murder of a fencing teacher

Robert Crichton, 8th Lord Crichton of Sanquhar, (d. 1612) was a Scottish peer executed for the murder of a fencing teacher. He was the son of Edward, Lord Sanquhar. Robert is often styled "6th Lord Sanquhar."

== Career ==
In October 1590 Robert Crichton decided to travel abroad for his education. His advisors, including Sir John Carmichael tried to persuade him to stay in Scotland and get married. James VI gave him a licence to travel. Carmichael's son Hugh went to London to hasten his return.

Robert Crichton was rumoured to have been in Rome in the company of Jesuits and to have spoken with the Pope in 1593. The Jesuit missionary to Scotland, William Crichton, was his kinsman.

Crichton was a noted swordsman. In June 1596 he challenged Patrick, Earl of Orkney to a duel. James VI forbade him to issue the challenge, called a "cartel." However, they arranged to fight, but the King was able to prevent their combat. The English diplomat Robert Bowes heard that Sanquhar alleged the quarrel was Sanquhar's loss of a court appointment, but according to rumour Sanquhar had been encouraged to fight the Earl by another powerful figure.

As a diplomat, Crichton took the letters of James VI of Scotland to Henry IV of France and Henri, Duke of Rohan at the siege of Amiens in 1597, and then travelled to Italy. Sanquhar later told a Venetian diplomat in London, Giovanni Carlo Scaramelli, that he had met the Pope in Ferrara. He said he told the Pope that James VI would tolerate Catholics in England at the Union of the Crowns.

On 27 May 1602, he returned from his travels and was welcomed by James VI at Dunfermline Palace, and attended the christening of Robert Stuart, Duke of Kintyre. Robert had met Elizabeth I of England at the insistence of the French diplomats in London. According to one who spoke to him there, Robert had resolved to serve the Spanish king. In June 1602 Robert, who was a friend of Anne of Denmark's favourite, Barbara Ruthven, was granted the Gowrie House lodging in Perth, which the Ruthven family had forfeited in 1600, with the offices of Constable and Keeper of the town.

In July he was appointed to attend the French ambassador, the Baron de Tour, who arrived before Lord Sanquhar knew it. Subsequently, Sanquhar acted as an interpreter between the Baron de Tour and the English diplomat George Nicholson.

Sanquhar spoke to Sir Robert Cecil asking if he would speak to Barbara Ruthven in person, but Cecil was unwilling. It is unclear if this discussion occurred in May 1602 or in the autumn of 1602.

== London, a fencing accident, and murder ==
Lord Sanquhar followed King James to England after the Union of Crowns. He was involved in the reception of Venetian ambassadors at Wilton House in December 1603. On 10 August 1604, while staying with Lord Norreys, he went to practice swordsmanship with a fencing master called John Turner at Rycote. By accident, Sanquhar was hurt in the eye.

On 9 February 1608 he performed in the masque The Hue and Cry After Cupid at Whitehall Palace as a sign of the zodiac, to celebrate the wedding of John Ramsay, Viscount Haddington to Elizabeth Radclyffe .

After some years, and following teasing for his disfigurement by the King of France, Sanquhar's followers murdered the fencing master. Turner was killed by a pistol shot on 11 May 1612, while he was drinking with some of Lord Sanquhar's followers. One called Carlisle fired the fatal shot. After four days Lord Sanquhar went to the Archbishop of Canterbury and declared that he was innocent of the murder. King James issued a proclamation of a reward of £500 for Sanquhar alive, and £300 dead. For Carlisle, the reward was £100 alive and £50 dead. Soon afterwards, another of Sanquhar's servants, a Scotsman called Gray, was arrested at Harwich where he was embarking on a ship for Denmark. Gray confessed that Lord Sanquhar had previously asked him to kill Turner.

Lord Sanquhar was brought before the justices of the King's Bench. Not being a peer of England, he was tried under the name of Robert Crichton, although a baron of three hundred years' standing. Francis Bacon delivered the charges against him. Bacon suggested his offence was caused by Italian manners he had picked up on his travels, rather than English or Scottish custom. His wife Anne Fermor divorced him and later married the Irish nobleman Barnabas O'Brien, 6th Earl of Thomond.

He was executed by hanging on 29 June 1612 in Westminster Palace yard, confessing that he had offended England and Scotland, and declared he was a Roman Catholic.

His body was taken by Lord Dingwall and Robert Kerr, Lord Roxburgh to be sent to Scotland.

By his marriage at St. Anne's, Blackfriars, 10 April 1608, to Anne, daughter of Sir George Fermor of Easton, he had no issue. All his property was left to his natural son, Robert Crichton, but the heir male, William, seventh lord Sanquhar, disputed the succession, and on the matter being referred to James VI Robert Crichton was served heir of entail to him in the estate of Sanquhar 15 July 1619.

He had another son, William, who was 21 or near that age in 1616, when the Earl of Roxburghe was one of his curators.

Peerage of Scotland
Preceded by Edward Crichton	Lord Crichton of Sanquhar; 1569–1612	Succeeded by William Crichton
