= William Crichton, 1st Earl of Dumfries =

William Crichton
- Lord Crichton of Sanquhar; Viscount of Ayr (1622-1642/3); Earl of Dumfries (1633-1642/3)
- Issue: William Crichton, 2nd Earl of Dumfries; James Crichton; John Crichton; Mary Crichton; Catherine Crichton
- Father: William Crichton, tutor of Sanquhar
- Mother: Katherine Carmichael

William Crichton, 1st Earl of Dumfries the ninth Lord Crichton, was born to William Crichton (brother of the sixth and seventh Lords Crichton) and Katherine Carmichael.

The title Lord Crichton passed to William after his cousin Robert was hanged outside Westminster Hall for his involvement with a murder. A challenge arose to his claim to the title and lands from an illegitimate son of Robert, but a decree arbitral from King James VI found in favour of William's rights to the title, and compensated Robert's son with lands around Perth.

On 31 July 1617, King James VI stayed at Sanquhar Castle while travelling through Scotland. During this visit, Crichton is reported to have burnt a bond recording a large debt owed to him the King. In 1622, the King gave Crichton the title Viscount of Ayr. Eleven years later, King Charles I of England gave Crichton the title Earl of Dumfries and Baron Crichton of Cumnock. Then in 1635, Crichton was given Lefnoreis Castle and surrounding lands (on which a descendant would later build Dumfries House).

By the time of his death in 1642 or 1643, due to the family's financial difficulties William and his sons had sold Sanquhar Castle and the estates in the area to William Douglas, 1st Earl of Queensberry, and relocated the family to Cumnock.

== Family ==
He first married Euphemia Seton, daughter of Sir James Seton of Touch and widow of Patrick Hamilton, and they produced five children.

- William, the second Earl of Dumfries
- James, who served for a time as Sheriff of Dumfries
- John, who served as a colonel in the Thirty Years' War.
- Mary, who married Edward Barnham Swift Viscount Carlingford
- Catherine, who married Sir John Charteris of Amsfield a Commissioner of the Scottish Parliament

He then married Ursula Barnham, daughter of Stephen Barnham and widow of Sir Robert Swift High Sheriff of Yorkshire. She and William produced no children.

Peerage of Scotland
New creation	Earl of Dumfries; 1633–1642/43	Succeeded by William Crichton
New creation	Viscount of Ayr; 1622–1642/43	Succeeded by William Crichton
Preceded by Robert Crichton	Lord Crichton of Sanquhar; 1612–1642/43	Succeeded by William Crichton
