= John Dalrymple, 13th Earl of Stair =

British peer (1906–1996)

Lieutenant colonel The Right Honourable The Earl of Stair KCVO MBE JP DL

Lord-Lieutenant of Wigtownshire
- In office 1961–1983
- Preceded by: The Earl of Stair
- Succeeded by: Maj. Henry John Brewis

Personal details
- Born: John Aymer Dalrymple; 9 October 1906 Stair, East Ayrshire, Scotland
- Died: 26 February 1996 (aged 89) Lochinch Castle, Scotland
- Relations: Lady Jean Rankin (sister)
- Children: John Dalrymple, 14th Earl of Stair; Hon. David Hew Dalrymple; Hon. Michael Colin Dalrymple
- Parent(s): John Dalrymple, 12th Earl of Stair; Violet Evelyn Harford
- Education: Eton College
- Alma mater: Royal Military Academy, Sandhurst

John Aymer Dalrymple, 13th Earl of Stair KCVO MBE JP DL (9 October 1906 – 26 February 1996), styled Viscount Dalrymple from 1906 until 1961; was a British peer and soldier.

== Early life ==
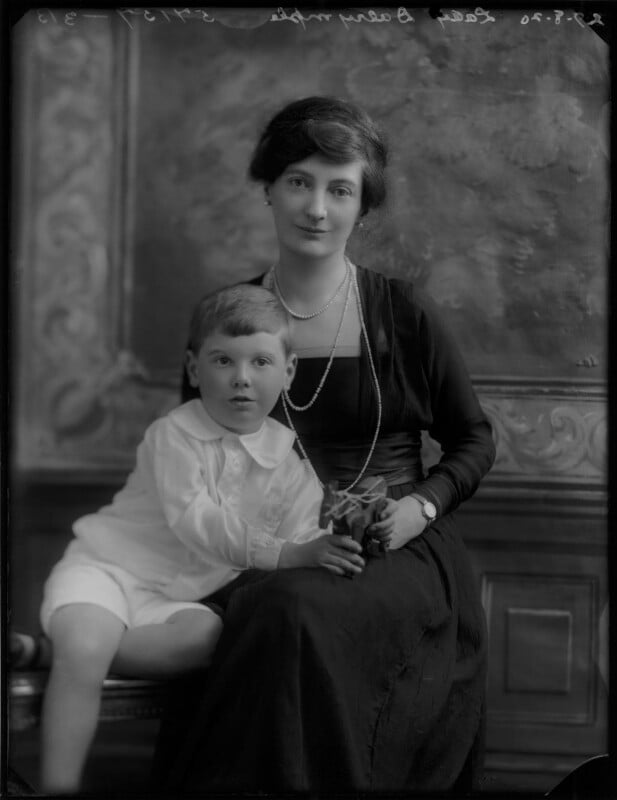
John Aymer Dalrymple photographed with his mother Violet Evelyn Dalrymple (née Harford), Countess of Stair

Dalrymple was born on 9 October 1906 at Stair, East Ayrshire, Scotland. He was the eldest son of John Dalrymple, 12th Earl of Stair and Violet Evelyn Harford. His elder sister was Lady Jean Rankin, and his younger siblings were Lady Marion Violet Dalrymple, Capt. Hon. Hew North Dalrymple, Hon. Andrew William Henry Dalrymple (a founder of Chilton Aircraft), and Maj. Hon. Colin James Dalrymple.

His paternal grandparents were John Dalrymple, 11th Earl of Stair and the former Susan Harriet Grant-Suttie (a daughter of Sir James Grant-Suttie, 6th Baronet and Lady Susan Harriet Innes-Ker). His maternal grandparents were Col. Frederick Henry Harford and Florence Helen Isabella Parsons (a granddaughter of the 2nd Earl of Rosse).

He was educated at Eton College before attending the Royal Military Academy, Sandhurst.

== Career ==
In 1936, Viscount Dalrymple was appointed a Justice of the Peace for Wigtownshire. He was appointed a Member of the Most Excellent Order of the British Empire in 1941.

He began his military career as a Brigade major with the 3rd London Infantry Brigade. As a Lieutenant-Colonel of the 1st Battalion, Scots Guards between 1942 and 1943, took part in World War II, fighting in the Middle East and Central Mediterranean. For his efforts, he was mentioned in dispatches. After the War, he was Lieutenant-Colonel of the 2nd Battalion, Scots Guards from 1946 and to 1952, becoming Honorary Colonel of the Scots Guards upon his retirement in 1953.

In 1953, he was Deputy Lieutenant of Wigtownshire before succeeding to his father's titles, including the earldom of Stair, and as Lord-Lieutenant of Wigtownshire upon his father's death in 1961. He was appointed Commander of the Royal Victorian Order in 1964 and served as Captain-General of the Royal Company of Archers. He held the office of Gold Stick of Scotland between 1973 and 1988. In 1978, he was further honoured as a Knight Commander of the Royal Victorian Order.

=== Olympic career ===
He competed in the four-man bobsleigh event at the 1928 Winter Olympics.

== Personal life ==
On 14 January 1960, Lord Stair married the Queen's cousin, Davina Katherine Bowes-Lyon (1930–2017), a daughter of the Hon. Sir David Bowes-Lyon (the sixth son of Claude Bowes-Lyon, 14th Earl of Strathmore and Kinghorne, and Cecilia Nina Cavendish-Bentinck) and Rachel Pauline Clay (a daughter of Herbert Henry Spender-Clay). Together, they had three children:

- John David James Dalrymple, 14th Earl of Stair (b. 1961), who married Hon. Emily Mary Julia Stonor, daughter of Thomas Stonor, 7th Baron Camoys and Elizabeth Mary Hyde Parker (a daughter of Sir William Hyde Parker, 11th Baronet), in 2006.
- Hon. David Hew Dalrymple (b. 1963), who married Emma R. Woods, daughter of Peter Woods of Betchworth, Surrey.
- Hon. Michael Colin Dalrymple (b. 1965). He married Harriet Lucy Buxton, daughter of Sir Jocelyn Buxton, 7th Baronet and Ann Frances Smitherman, in 1991.

Lord Stair died at Lochinch Castle on 26 February 1996, aged 89, and was succeeded by his eldest son, John.

Peerage of Scotland
Preceded by John James Dalrymple	Earl of Stair; 1961–1996	Succeeded by John David James Dalrymple
