= Egerton Hall, Manchester =

Former educational institution in England

Coordinates: 53.274°N 2.131°W

Egerton Hall, Manchester was founded as a Theological College in 1908 to train Anglican clergy to serve in the Church of England.It was located in Oxford Place and closed in 1944.
