= William Vesey Brownlow =

British Army general

Major-General William Vesey Brownlow CB
- Born: 12 June 1841
- Died: 15 March 1928 (aged 86)
- Military career
- Allegiance: United Kingdom
- Branch: British Army
- Service years: 1859–1926
- Rank: Major-General
- Commands: 22nd Regimental District (the Cheshire Regiment)
- Conflicts: Anglo-Zulu War; First Boer War
- Awards: Companion of the Order of the Bath

Major-General William Vesey Brownlow CB (12 June 1841 – 15 March 1928) was a British Army officer.

== Military career ==
Brownlow was commissioned as an ensign the 30th (Cambridgeshire) Regiment of Foot in April 1859. He served in the Anglo-Zulu War in 1879 and the First Boer War in 1880. At the Battle of Laing's Nek during the First Boer War, he was wounded and had his horse shot out from under him. He was rescued by Private John Doogan who was awarded the Victoria Cross for his action.

Brownlow became assistant commandant and superintendent at the Riding Establishment Cavalry Depot in May 1882 and commanded the 22nd Regimental District (the Cheshire Regiment) from 1889 to 1894. He went on to serve as colonel of the 1st King's Dragoon Guards from 1908 to 1926.

He lived at Boughton Hall in Great Boughton, Cheshire. He was also High Sheriff of Monaghan from 1907 to 1908.

== Family ==
Brownlow married Lady Anne Henrietta, daughter of John Dalrymple, 10th Earl of Stair in November 1881. After the death of his first wife, he married Lady Kathleen Susan Emma, daughter of John Bligh, 6th Earl of Darnley in June 1904.

Honorary titles
Preceded by Sir James Sayer	Colonel of the 1st King's Dragoon Guards; 1908–1926	Succeeded by Sir Charles Briggs
