= Frederick Dalrymple-Hamilton =

Royal Navy admiral (1890–1974)

Admiral Sir Frederick Dalrymple-Hamilton KCB
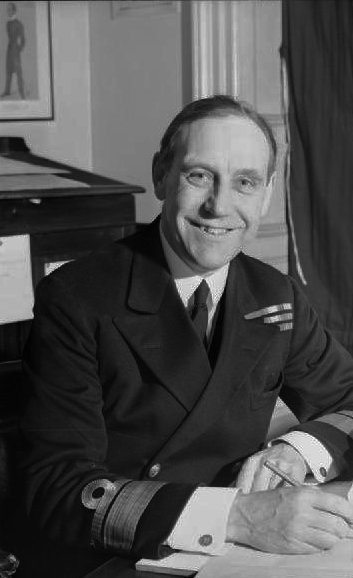
- Dalrymple-Hamilton as a rear admiral
- Born: 27 March 1890; Bargany, Girvan, Ayrshire
- Died: 26 December 1974 (aged 84); Bargany, Girvan, Ayrshire
- Relatives: Sir North Dalrymple-Hamilton (brother); North Dalrymple-Hamilton (son)
- Military career
- Allegiance: United Kingdom
- Branch: Royal Navy
- Service years: 1905–1950
- Rank: Admiral
- Commands: Flag Officer Scotland and Northern Ireland (1946–48); 10th Cruiser Squadron (1944–45); Admiral Commanding, Iceland (1941–42); HMS Rodney (1939–41); Royal Naval College, Dartmouth (1936–39); 4th Destroyer Flotilla (1933–36)
- Conflicts: First World War; Second World War; Operation Anklet; Last battle of the battleship Bismarck; Operation Overlord; Action of 28 January 1945
- Awards: Knight Commander of the Order of the Bath; Mentioned in Despatches
- Other work: Member, Queen's Body Guard for Scotland, Royal Company of Archers (1947–73); Justice of the Peace and Deputy Lieutenant for Wigtownshire

Admiral Sir Frederick Hew George Dalrymple-Hamilton, KCB (27 March 1890 – 26 December 1974) was a senior Royal Navy officer who served in the First and Second World Wars. He was captain of HMS Rodney when it engaged the Bismarck on 27 May 1941.

== Naval career ==
Dalrymple-Hamilton was the second son of Colonel the Hon. North de Coigny Dalrymple-Hamilton of Bargany, Girvan, Ayrshire, and the grandson of the 10th Earl of Stair. Sir North Dalrymple-Hamilton was his elder brother.

He joined the Royal Navy in 1905 and served in the First World War. Promoted to captain in 1931, he was appointed Captain (Destroyers) for the 4th Destroyer Flotilla in 1933 and Captain of the Royal Naval College, Dartmouth, in 1936.

From 1939 to 1941 he commanded the battleship HMS Rodney and oversaw the sinking of the German battleship Bismarck. During that battle his son, North, served in a gun director position aboard HMS King George V. Dalrymple-Hamilton subsequently told his son: "You are lucky to have seen a show like that after only being in the Navy for 18 months – I’ve had to wait 35 years".

He was appointed Admiral Commanding, Iceland in 1941 and Naval Secretary in 1942. He became commander of the 10th Cruiser Squadron and second-in-command of the Home Fleet in 1944, flying his flag in HMS Belfast in June 1944 during the D-Day landings at Normandy. A few months later he commanded the escorts of several Arctic convoys as well as the British forces involved in the inconclusive action of 28 January 1945. He went on to be Vice-Admiral Malta and Flag Officer, Central Mediterranean in April 1945.

After the war Dalrymple-Hamilton was appointed Flag Officer Scotland and Northern Ireland; from 1948 he was admiral at the British Joint Services Mission in Washington D. C.

== Family ==
Dalyrmple's father was the Hon. North de Coigny Dalrymple-Hamilton and his mother was Marcia Liddell.

He married Gwendolen Peek in 1918. They had one son and two daughters. The family home was at Clady House in Cairnryan, Wigtownshire.

Their son Captain North Edward Frederick Dalrymple-Hamilton (1922–2014) followed his father into the Royal Navy and became executive officer of the Royal Yacht Britannia. Lady Dalrymple-Hamilton died in 1974.

== Bibliography ==
- Pursuit: The Sinking of the Bismarck Ludovic Kennedy
- HMS Rodney, Iain Ballantyne, Pen & Sword Books, Yorkshire, 2008, ISBN 978 1 84415 406 7
- Killing the Bismarck, Iain Ballantyne, Pen & Sword Books, Yorkshire, 2010, ISBN 978 1 84415 983 3
- Reports of Proceedings 1921–1964, Rear Admiral G.G.O. Gatacre, Nautical Press & Publications, Sydney, 1982, ISBN 0 949756 02 4

Military offices
Preceded by Arthur Peters	Naval Secretary; 1942–1944	Succeeded by Cecil Harcourt
Preceded by Sir Louis Hamilton	Flag Officer, Malta; 1945–1946	Succeeded by Marcel Kelsey
Preceded by William Whitworth as Commander-in-Chief, Rosyth	Flag Officer Scotland and Northern Ireland; 1946–1948	Succeeded by Sir Ernest Archer
