= Lady Jean Rankin =

Scottish naturalist and courtier (1905–2001)

Lady Jean Margaret Florence Rankin DCVO (née Dalrymple; 15 August 1905 – 3 October 2001) was a Scottish naturalist and courtier who served as Woman of the Bedchamber to Queen Elizabeth The Queen Mother from 1947–1994.

== Early life ==
Rankin was born at Oxenfoord Castle, Midlothian, the eldest child of John Dalrymple, 12th Earl of Stair (then Viscount Dalrymple) and Violet Evelyn Harford, only daughter of Col. Frederick Henry Harford and Florence Helen Isabella Parsons, granddaughter of Lawrence Parsons, 2nd Earl of Rosse. She grew up at the family seats at Oxenfoord and at Lochinch Castle, a 75,000-acre estate in Wigtownshire—where she learned to drive at age 12—as well as in London, where her father represented Wigtownshire as an MP (1906–14).

After the war broke out in 1914, her father was sent with the Scots Guards to France, where in November he was captured during the Great Retreat. Her grandfather died the following month and her father succeeded to the earldom while a prisoner of war. After three years at a German prisoner of war camp in Krefeld, his eyesight deteriorated, and in 1917 he was released on a prisoner exchange in Switzerland, where the family lived for some time in Château-d'Œx.

At age 18, Lady Jean insisted on working and became part of the editorial staff at the weekly Queen magazine—"a fairly racy thing to do" at the time for a teenager of her background.

== Lady-in-waiting ==
Rankin was first appointed an Extra Woman of the Bedchamber to Queen Elizabeth in May 1947, and four months later appointed to Woman of the Bedchamber.

As a lady-in-waiting to the Queen (later the Queen Mother), Lady Jean divided her time between her home in Scotland and the Royal Household. She also accompanied the Queen Mother on tours to Canada and the United States (1954) and Australia (1958), and accompanied Princess Margaret to Paris (1951) and Norway (1953). Lady Jean was particularly close with Princess Margaret; The Times noted that she "played a pivotal role during [Princess Margaret's] fraught relationship with Group Captain Peter Townsend, acting as a go-between and counselor, especially during the sad period after the princess decided to call off their engagement."

She held this position until January 1982, when she was once again appointed an Extra Woman of the Bedchamber. She frequently accompanied the Queen Mother to private dinner parties until 1994, when declining health necessitated her retirement from court life and a move into a nursing home in Edinburgh.

== Personal life and family ==
On 10 October 1931, she married Lt-Col. Arthur Niall Talbot Rankin (1904–1965), an ornithological photographer and writer who was a Scots Guards officer in the Emergency Reserve. He was the second son of Sir Reginald Rankin, 2nd Baronet, from whom he was estranged until he met Lady Jean. Upon hearing that Niall Rankin's parents had been divorced and he had in fact never met his own father, the Earl of Stair was unimpressed with Rankin's desire to marry his daughter, and he insisted they reconcile. Rankin introduced Lady Jean to his father, who although he died shortly before their wedding, was so delighted that he surprisingly left his estate of £20,000 (equivalent to £1,180,000 in 2025) to his new daughter-in-law.

They had two sons:

- Sir Ian Niall Rankin, 4th Baronet (19 December 1932 – 10 November 2020), inherited baronetcy from his grandfather
- Sir Alick Michael Rankin (23 January 1935 – 3 August 1999), head of the Scottish & Newcastle brewing group

Lady Jean and her husband were both explorers, naturalists and licensed pilots with their own plane. The family traveled frequently, including a year spent abroad in Hollywood. In 1937, they purchased the 1,900-acre Treshnish estate in Calgary on the Isle of Mull, which included a 320-acre chain of uninhabited islands on which they pursued their interest in birds, establishing a collection of rare geese and ducks. Niall Rankin spent the winter of 1947 in Antarctica, authoring the book on birds, Antarctic Isle.

Treshnish became a wildlife sanctuary in 1994, when Lady Jean moved to Edinburgh. She died there in 2001, aged 96.

== Honours ==
Lady Jean was appointed a Commander of the Royal Victorian Order in the 1957 New Year Honours, and was appointed a Dame Commander of the Order in the 1969 Birthday Honours.
