= John Dalrymple, 10th Earl of Stair =

Scottish nobleman and politician

The Right Honourable The Earl of Stair KT JP DL
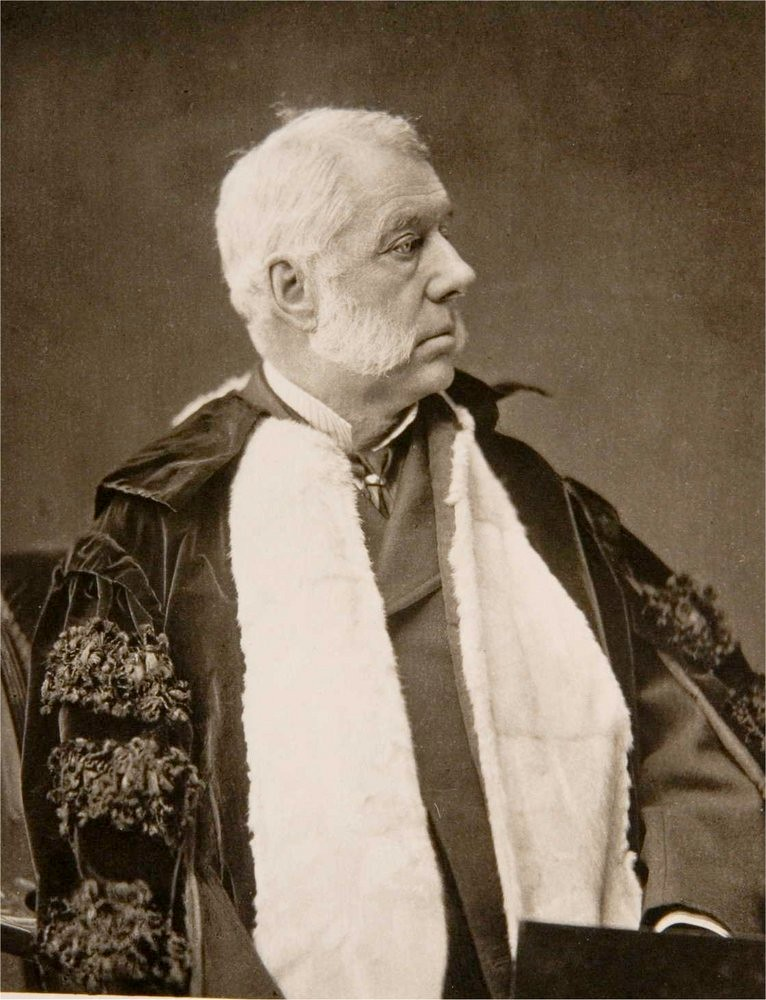

Member of Parliament for Wigtownshire
- In office 1841–1856
- Preceded by: James Blair
- Succeeded by: Sir Andrew Agnew, Bt

Personal details
- Born: John Aymer Dalrymple; 1 April 1819
- Died: 3 December 1903 (aged 84)
- Spouse: Louisa Jane Henrietta Emily de Franquetot (m. 1846; died 1896)
- Relations: John Dalrymple, 12th Earl of Stair (grandson)
- Children: 8
- Parent(s): North Dalrymple, 9th Earl of Stair; Margaret Penny

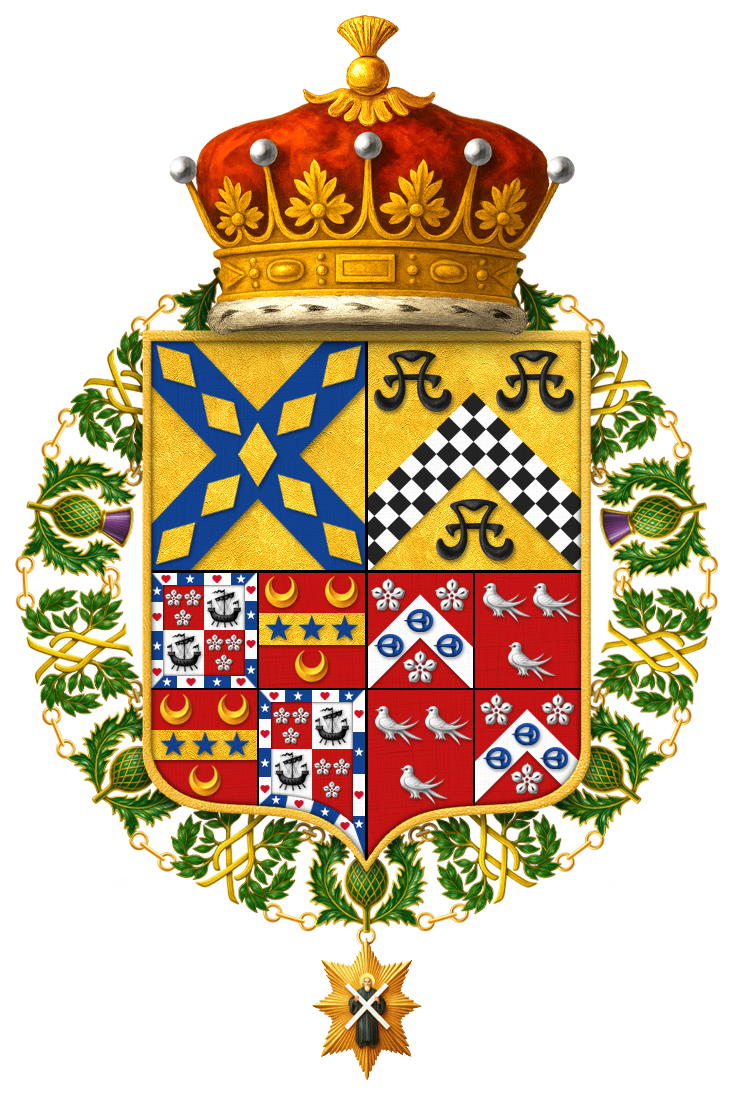
Shield of Arms of John Hamilton Dalrymple, 10th Earl of Stair, KT, JP, DL

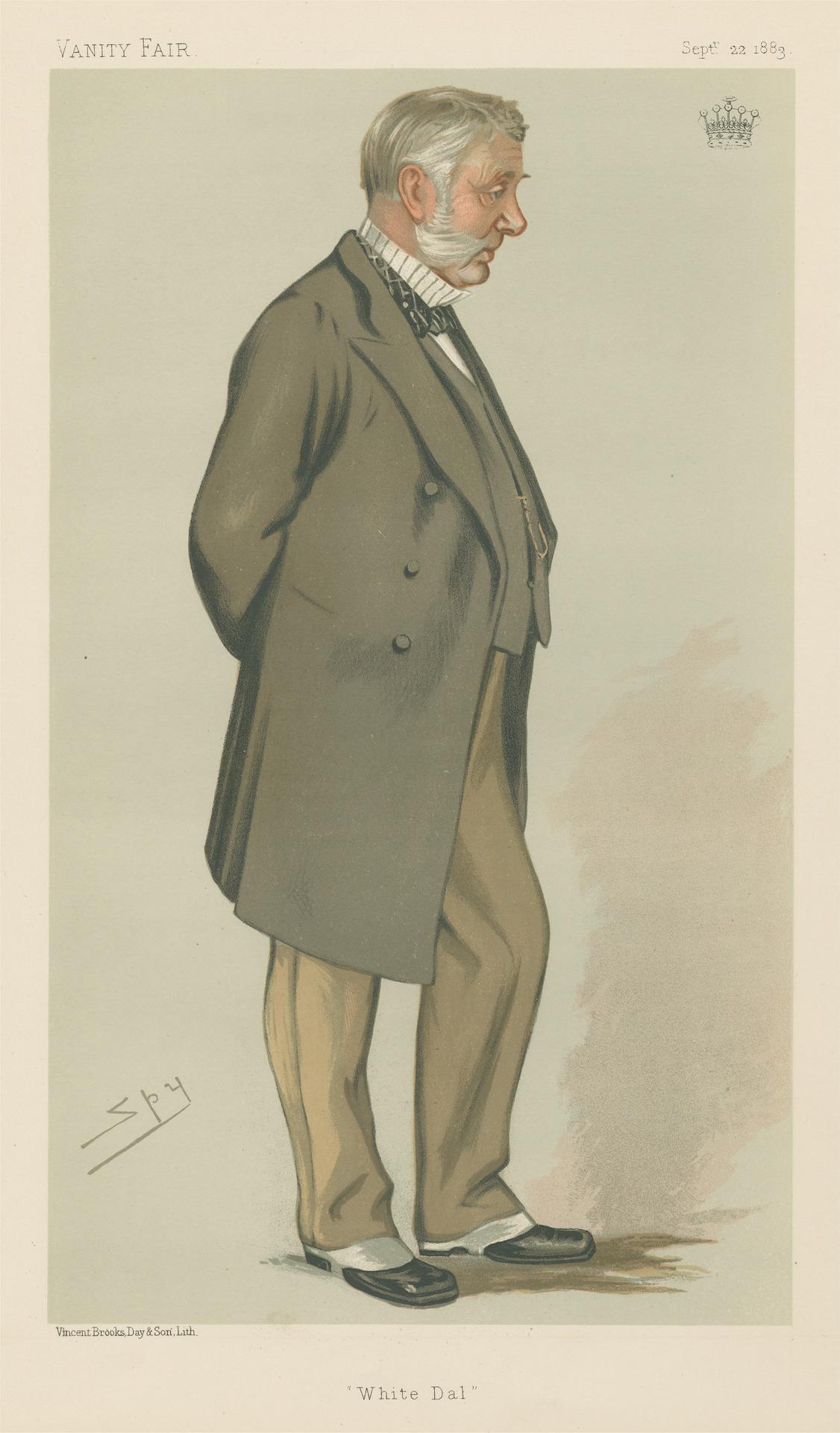
"White Dal" The Earl of Stair as caricatured by Spy (Leslie Ward) in Vanity Fair, September 1883

John Hamilton Dalrymple, 10th Earl of Stair, KT JP DL (1 April 1819 – 3 December 1903), styled Viscount Dalrymple from 1853 until 1864, was a Scottish peer and politician, who served as Governor of the Bank of Scotland for thirty-three years.

== Early life ==
He was the eldest son of North Dalrymple, 9th Earl of Stair, and his first wife, Margaret Penny (d. 1828). His sister, Lady Margaret Dalrymple, married advocate and amateur botanist Allan Alexander Maconochie. After his mother's death in 1828, his father remarried to Martha Willett Dalrymple, daughter of Col. George Dalrymple.

His paternal grandparents were Sir John Dalrymple, 4th Baronet and, his cousin, Elizabeth Hamilton MacGill (daughter and heiress of Thomas Hamilton of Fala, who himself had inherited Oxenfoord Castle, property of the Viscounts of Oxfuird). His maternal grandfather was James Penny of Arrad, Lancashire.

== Career ==
He represented Wigtownshire in Parliament from 1841 to 1856. He became Earl of Stair on the death of his father in 1864, and served as Lord Lieutenant of Ayrshire from 1870 to 1897. From 1870 to 1903 he was the Governor of the Bank of Scotland. After it was proposed in 1877, he successfully opposed the southward extension to Drummore of the Portpatrick and Wigtownshire Joint Railway. He also served as Lord High Commissioner to the Church of Scotland from 1869 to 1871. Between 1896 and 1902 he served as President of the Edinburgh conservation body the Cockburn Association.

== Personal life ==
In 1846, he married his cousin, Louisa Jane Henrietta Emily de Franquetot, the Edinburgh-born eldest daughter of Augustin-Gustave de Franquetot, 3rd Duke of Coigny and Henrietta Dundas Dalrymple-Hamilton (a daughter of Sir Hew Dalrymple-Hamilton, 4th Baronet). Together, they had eight children, including:

- John Dalrymple, 11th Earl of Stair (1848–1914), who married Susan Harriet Grant-Suttie, daughter of Sir James Grant-Suttie, 6th Bt. and Lady Susan Harriet Innes-Ker, in 1878.
- Lady Jane Georgina Dalrymple (1850−1914), a twin who married Sir Arthur Vivian, a son of industrialist John Henry Vivian.
- Lady Anne Henrietta Dalrymple (1850–1899), a twin who married Major-Gen. William Vesey Brownlow.
- Hon. North de Coigny Dalrymple-Hamilton of Bargany (1853–1906), who married Marcia Liddell.
- Hon. Sir Hew Hamilton Dalrymple KCVO (1857–1945), who died unmarried.
- Hon. Robert McGill Dalrymple (b. 1862), a Reverend who became Vicar of St. Stephen's Church, Sneinton, Nottingham.

Lady Stair died on 30 June 1896. Lord Stair died on 3 December 1903.

=== Descendants ===
Through his son North, he was a grandfather of Colonel Sir North Dalrymple-Hamilton and Admiral Sir Frederick Dalrymple-Hamilton.

Parliament of the United Kingdom
Preceded by James Blair	Member of Parliament for Wigtownshire; 1841–1856	Succeeded by Sir Andrew Agnew, Bt
Academic offices
Preceded by The Duke of Buccleuch	Chancellor of the University of Glasgow; 1884–1904	Succeeded by Sir William Thomson
Honorary titles
Preceded by The Earl of Galloway	Lord Lieutenant of Wigtown; 1851–1903	Succeeded by Sir Herbert Maxwell
Preceded by The Marquess of Ailsa	Lord Lieutenant of Ayrshire; 1870–1897	Succeeded by The Earl of Eglinton
Peerage of Scotland
Preceded by North Hamilton Dalrymple	Earl of Stair; 1864–1903	Succeeded by John Hamilton-Dalrymple
