= William Dalrymple (British Army officer) =

British Army officer and politician

General William Dalrymple
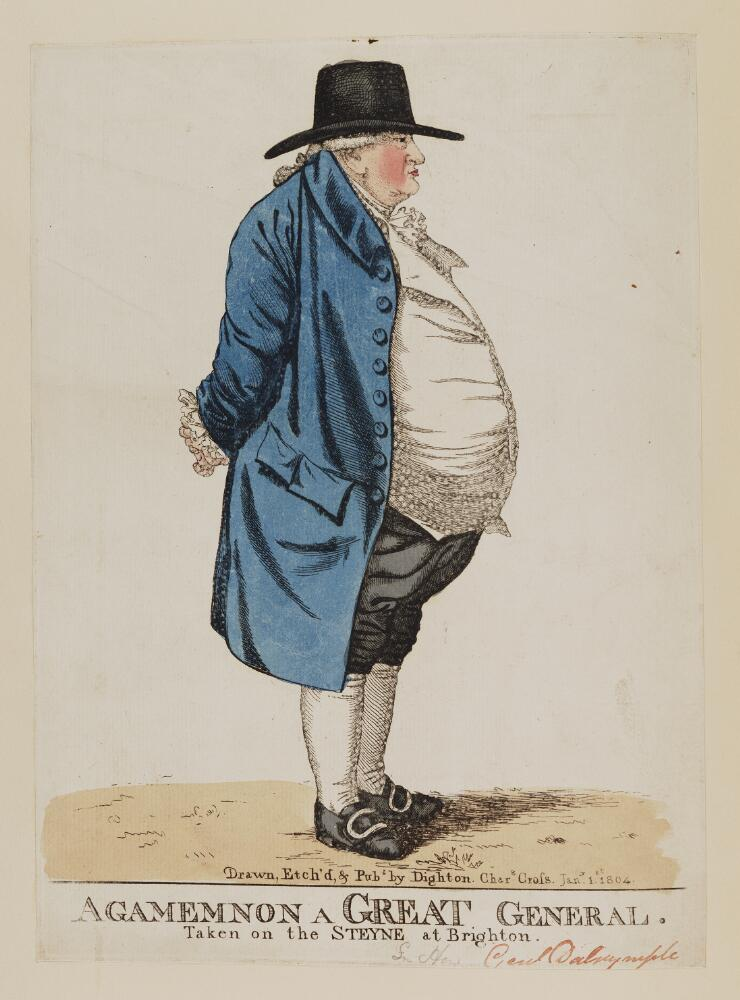
- "Agamemnon a great general, taken on the Steyne at Brighton"
- Born: 1736
- Died: 16 February 1807 (aged 70–71)

William Dalrymple (1736 – 16 February 1807) was a British Army officer and politician who sat in the Parliament of Great Britain and the Parliament of Ireland. He was the son of George Dalrymple, a brother of John Dalrymple, 5th Earl of Stair. Father of John Dalrymple, 7th Earl of Stair.

== Life ==
He was educated at Glasgow University, graduating in 1749. In 1752 he joined the British Army, becoming an ensign in the 52nd Regiment of Foot. He became a lieutenant in 1759 and a captain (in the 91st Regiment of Foot) from 1760. By 1762 he was a major, and served in the campaign against the Spanish invasion of Portugal (1762). After a period on half pay in 1763, he was appointed to the 14th Regiment of Foot in 1764. He was promoted to lieutenant colonel in 1765.

Between 1766 and 1768, Dalrymple was in Halifax, Nova Scotia. In 1768, he was placed in command of a detachment of two regiments sent to Boston, Massachusetts, to support embattled royal officials who were having trouble enforcing the unpopular Townshend Acts. Troops in his command (although he was not directly involved) were involved in the Boston Massacre, in which five Bostonians were killed during a confrontation with a group of soldiers. Amid continuing hostility, Dalrymple acceded to the request of Acting Governor Thomas Hutchinson to remove his troops to Castle William, an island fortress in Boston harbour.

In 1772-1773 Dalrymple received a local promotion to major general and commanded a force which captured the West Indian island of St Vincent. He returned to Britain in 1773. He continued to be in touch with his American Loyalist friends in Boston. He was saddened but not surprised by the Boston Tea Party.

After the American War of Independence broke out in 1775, Dalrymple returned to North America. He served as quartermaster general 1779-1783. He was promoted to brigadier general (1779) and then major general (1782).

After the end of the war Dalrymple was attacked for alleged corruption, but General William Howe stoutly defended his former subordinate and the allegations were dropped.

Dalrymple then went into politics. He represented Wigtown Burghs in the British House of Commons from 1784 to 1790. Between 1796 and 1798 he sat for Duleek in the Irish House of Commons.

Dalrymple was promoted to lieutenant-general 1793 and general 1798.

Lt. Governor of Royal Hospital Chelsea 22 Mar 1798 to 2 Apr 1804; and 19 Oct. 1804 to his death.

He was Colonel of the 47th (Lancashire) Regiment of Foot from 1794 to his death.

Parliament of Ireland
| Preceded by William Knott; Charles Montague Ormsby | Member of Parliament for Duleek; 1796–1797; With: Charles Montague Ormsby | Succeeded by Robert Rutledge; Charles Montague Ormsby |
Parliament of Great Britain
| Preceded by William Adam | Member of Parliament for Wigtown Burghs; 1784–1790 | Succeeded by Nisbet Balfour |
Military offices
| Preceded by Sir David Dundas | Governor of Inverness; 1804 | Succeeded by Alexander Ross |
