= North Dalrymple, 9th Earl of Stair =

Scottish nobleman

The Right Honourable The Earl of Stair
- Coat of Arms of the Earl of Stair
- Born: North Hamilton Dalrymple; 1776; Edinburgh, Scotland
- Died: 9 November 1864 (aged 87–88); Oxenfoord Castle, Scotland
- Spouse(s): Margaret Penny (m. 1817; died 1828) Martha Willett Dalrymple (m. 1831; died 1864)
- Children: 8
- Parent(s): Sir John Dalrymple, 4th Baronet; Elizabeth Hamilton-Makgill
- Relatives: John Hamilton Dalrymple, 8th Earl of Stair (brother)

North Hamilton Dalrymple, 9th Earl of Stair (1776 – 9 November 1864) was a Scottish aristocrat.

== Early life ==
Dalrymple was born in Edinburgh, Scotland in 1776. He was the second son of Sir John Dalrymple of Cousland, 4th Baronet (d. 1810), a Baron of the Court of the Exchequer of Scotland, and Elizabeth Hamilton-Makgill. Among his siblings were Henrietta Dundas Dalrymple-Hamilton, who married Augustin-Gustave de Franquetot, 3rd Duke of Coigny. His elder brother, John Hamilton Dalrymple, succeeded in to their father's baronetcy and inherited Oxenfoord Castle in 1810, and to the earldom of Stair upon the death of their second cousin, John Dalrymple, 7th Earl of Stair in March 1840.

His paternal grandparents were Sir William Dalrymple of Cranstoun, 3rd Baronet, and the former Agnes Crawford. His mother was the heiress and representative of the Viscounts of Oxfuird.

== Career ==
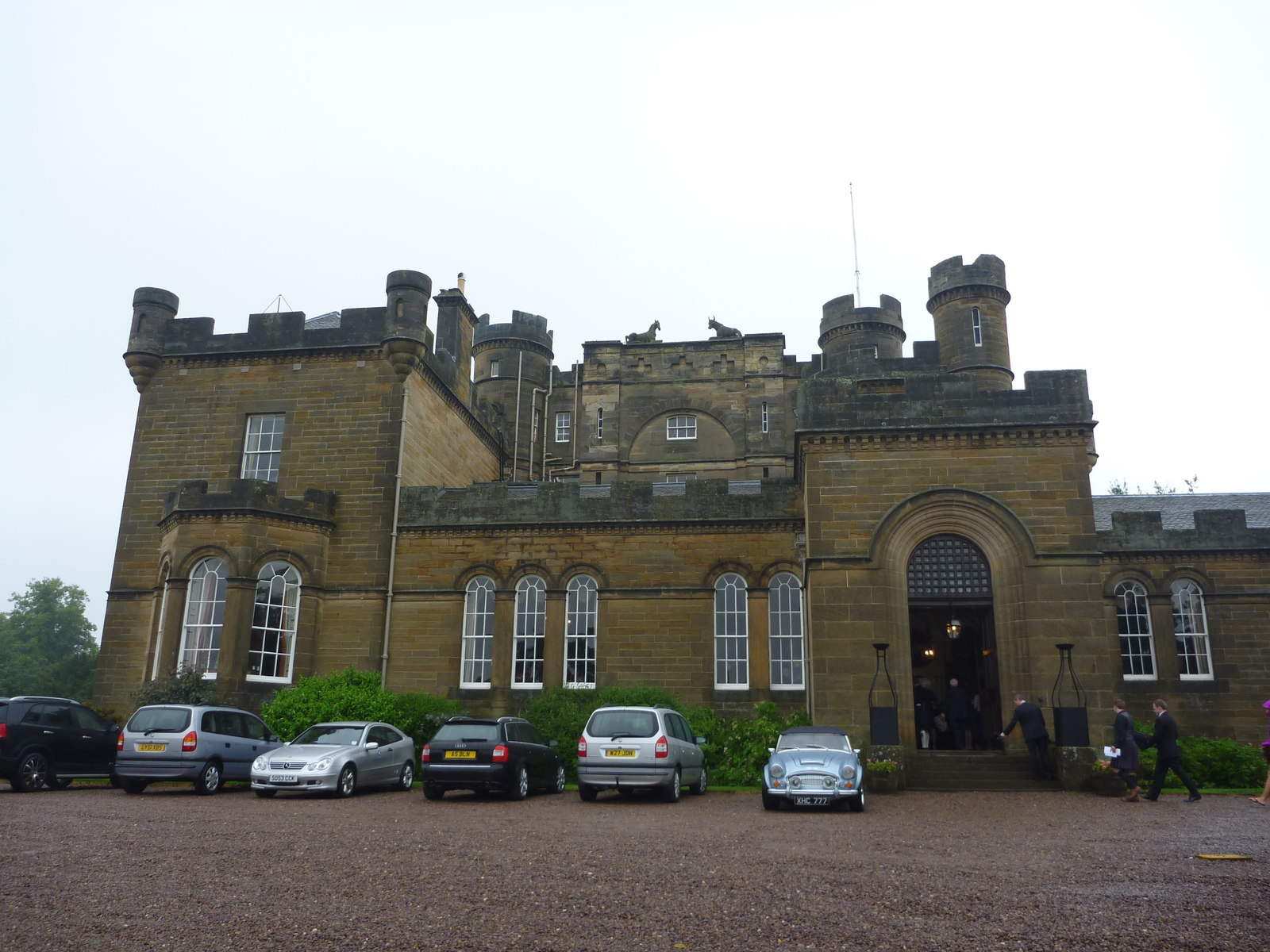
Oxenfoord Castle

Dalrymple was a merchant who lived at Bhavnagar, India.

On 10 January 1853, upon the death of his elder brother John Hamilton Dalrymple, former MP for Midlothian, he succeeded as the 9th Earl of Stair in the Peerage of Scotland, as well as the 2nd Baron Oxenfoord in the Peerage of the United Kingdom (by special remainder) and the 6th Dalrymple Baronet of Killock in the Baronetage of Nova Scotia. The barony of Oxenfoord gave him a seat in the House of Lords.

== Personal life ==
On 27 May 1817, he married Margaret Penny, a daughter of James Penny, Esq. of Arrad, Lancashire. Before her death in 1828, they were the parents of:

- Lady Elizabeth Hamilton Dalrymple (1818–1884), who died unmarried.
- John Hamilton Dalrymple, 10th Earl of Stair (1819–1903), who married his cousin, Louisa Jane Henrietta Emily de Franquetot, daughter of Augustin-Gustave de Franquetot, 3rd Duke of Coigny and Henrietta Dundas Dalrymple-Hamilton, in 1846.
- Lady Anne Dalrymple (1820–1919), who married Sir John Dick-Lauder, 8th Baronet, son of Sir Thomas Dick-Lauder, 7th Baronet, in 1845.
- Harriet Dalrymple (1821–1848), who died unmarried.
- Lady Agnes Dalrymple (1823–1900), who married John More Nisbett of The Drum, son of George More Nisbett, 7th of Cairnhill, om 1848.
- James Johnson Dalrymple (1824–1825), who died young.
- Lady Margaret Penny Dalrymple (1828–1888), who married Allan Alexander Maconochie in 1859.

He married, secondly, Martha Willett Dalrymple, daughter of Col. George Dalrymple of the 19th Regiment of Foot (son of Lt.-Col. Campbell Dalrymple) and Martha Willett Miller, on 23 March 1831. Together, they were the parents of:

- Hon. George Grey Dalrymple (1832–1900), who married Hon. Ellinor Alice Napier, daughter of Capt. William Napier, 9th Lord Napier of Merchistoun and Eliza Cochrane-Johnstone (daughter of Scottish adventurer Andrew Cochrane-Johnstone), in 1853.

Lord Stair died at Oxenfoord Castle on 9 November 1864 and was succeeded by his eldest son from his first marriage, John. Lady Stair died on 4 June 1869.

Peerage of Scotland
Preceded by John Hamilton Dalrymple	Earl of Stair; 1853–1864	Succeeded by John Hamilton Dalrymple
