= De Franquetot =

De Franquetot is a surname. Notable people with the surname include:

- Robert Jean Antoine de Franquetot de Coigny (1652–1704), French army officer, 2nd Count of Coigny
- François de Franquetot de Coigny (1670–1759), Marshal of France, 3rd Count and 1st Duke of Coigny
- François-Henri de Franquetot de Coigny (1737–1821), Marshal of France, 2nd Duke of Coigny
- Augustin-Gustave de Franquetot de Coigny (1788–1865), 3rd and last Duke of Coigny
