= John Dalrymple, 6th Earl of Stair =

Scottish peer, soldier and diplomat

John Dalrymple, 6th Earl of Stair (1749–1821) was a Scottish peer, soldier and diplomat.

== Life ==
The eldest son of John Dalrymple, 5th Earl of Stair, and his wife, a daughter of George Middleton, banker of London, was born 24 September 1749. As captain of the 87th Foot he served in the American War of Independence, taking part in the successful attack on New London, Connecticut under Benedict Arnold as his aide.

On 5 January 1782 Dalrymple was appointed minister plenipotentiary to Poland, and from 5 August 1785 until 1788 was minister plenipotentiary to Berlin. He succeeded to the peerage on the death of his father in 1789, and was a Scottish representative peer from 1793 to 1807, and from 1827 until death.

Stair died without issue on 1 June 1821. He was succeeded by his cousin John Dalrymple, 7th Earl of Stair whose father was William Dalrymple, brother of the 5th Earl of Stair John Dalrymple, 5th Earl of Stair.

== Notes ==
Attribution

This article incorporates text from a publication now in the public domain: Stephen, Leslie, ed. (1888). "Dalrymple, John (1749-1821)". Dictionary of National Biography. Vol. 13. London: Smith, Elder & Co.

Peerage of Scotland
Preceded by John Dalrymple	Earl of Stair; 1789–1821	Succeeded by John Dalrymple
