= John Dalrymple, 11th Earl of Stair =

Scottish nobleman

John Hew North Gustav Henry Hamilton-Dalrymple, 11th Earl of Stair (12 June 1848 – 2 December 1914), known as Viscount Dalrymple from 1864 to 1903, was a Scottish army officer and nobleman.

== Early life ==
Hamilton-Dalrymple was the son of John Hamilton Dalrymple, 10th Earl of Stair (the eldest son of North Dalrymple, 9th Earl of Stair) and his wife, Louisa Jane Henrietta Emily de Franquetot, the eldest daughter of Augustin-Gustave de Franquetot, 3rd Duke of Coigny and Henrietta Dundas Dalrymple-Hamilton (a daughter of Sir Hew Dalrymple-Hamilton, 4th Baronet)

== Career ==
Lord Stair was a captain of the Ayrshire (Earl of Carrick's Own) Yeomanry, and was promoted to major on 4 March 1902. He was granted the honorary rank of lieutenant-colonel on 2 August 1902.

In 1912 he became President of the influential Scottish conservationist group the Cockburn Association, relinquishing the position the following year. His son John would go on to become President of the group in 1932.

== Personal life ==
On 10 April 1878, he married Susan Harriet Grant-Suttie, daughter of Sir James Grant-Suttie, 6th Baronet, and Lady Susan Harriet Innes-Ker. Before their divorced in 1905, they were the parents of three children:

- John James Dalrymple, 12th Earl of Stair (1879–1961), who married Violet Evelyn Harford, daughter of Col. Frederick Henry Harford and Florence Helen Isabella Parsons (a granddaughter of the 2nd Earl of Rosse), in 1904.
- Lady Beatrice Susan Dalrymple (1881–1962), who married Archibald Montgomerie, 16th Earl of Eglinton in 1905. They divorced in 1922.
- Lady Marjorie Louise Dalrymple (1888–1971), who was appointed Dame of Grace, Order of Saint John and an Officer, Order of the British Empire.

Lord Stair died on 2 December 1914, aged 66.

Peerage of Scotland
| Preceded by John Hamilton Dalrymple | Earl of Stair; 1903–1914 | Succeeded by John James Dalrymple |
