= John Dalrymple, 8th Earl of Stair =

British soldier and politician

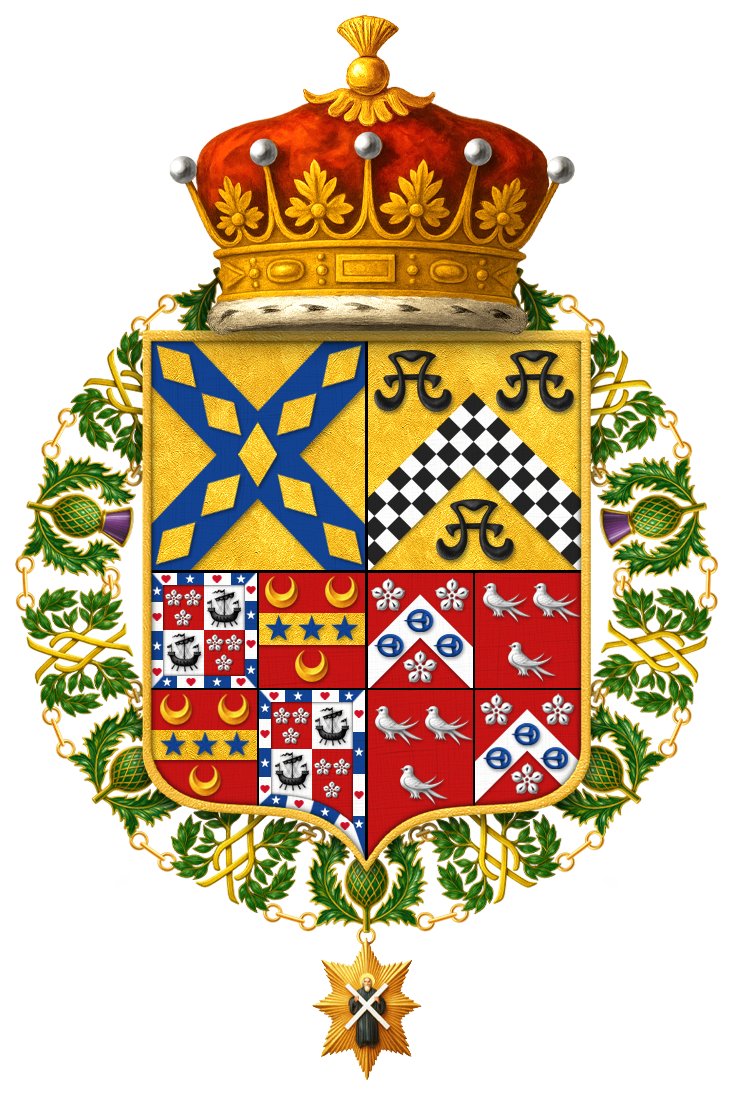
Shield of Arms of John Hamilton Dalrymple, 8th Earl of Stair, KT

General John Hamilton Dalrymple, 8th Earl of Stair, KT (14 June 1771 – 10 January 1853), known as Sir John Dalrymple, 5th Baronet, between 1810 and 1840, was a British soldier and politician.

== Background ==
Stair was the son of Sir John Dalrymple, 4th Baronet, and Elizabeth, daughter of Thomas Hamilton-Makgill and heiress and representative of the Viscounts of Oxfuird (or Oxenfoord). In 1810 he succeeded in the baronetcy, and inherited Oxenfoord Castle, on the death of his father. In March 1840 following the death of his 2nd cousin John Dalrymple, 7th Earl of Stair, who died without issue, he inherited the title of Earl of Stair.

== Military and political career ==
Stair was a general in the British Army. In 1832 he was returned to Parliament for Midlothian, as seat he held until 1835. He succeeded a distant relative as eighth Earl of Stair in 1840. As this was a Scottish peerage it did not entitle him to an automatic seat in the House of Lords. However, in 1841 he was created Baron Oxenfoord, of Cousland in the County of Edinburgh, in the Peerage of the United Kingdom, which gave him a seat in the upper chamber of parliament. The peerage was created with special remainder to his younger brother. The choice of title was in honour of the title held by his mother's family, Viscount of Oxfuird of Oxenfoord. In 1847 he was further honoured when he was appointed a Knight of the Thistle.

== Family ==
Lord Stair was twice married. He married firstly Harriet, daughter of Reverend Robert Augustus Johnson, in 1795. After her death in 1823 he married secondly the Hon. Adamina, daughter of Admiral Adam Duncan, 1st Viscount Duncan, in 1825. Both marriages were childless. Lord Stair died in January 1853, aged 81, and was succeeded in his titles (in the barony of Oxenfoord according to the special remainder) by his younger brother, North Dalrymple. The Countess of Stair died in August 1857.

Parliament of the United Kingdom
| Preceded by Sir George Clerk, Bt | Member of Parliament for Midlothian; 1832–1835 | Succeeded by Sir George Clerk, Bt |
Military offices
| Preceded by John Ross | Colonel of the 46th (the South Devonshire) Regiment of Foot; 1843–1853 | Succeeded by Richard Egerton |
| Preceded by Alexander Duff | Colonel of the 92nd Regiment of Foot; 1831–1842 | Succeeded by William Macbean |
Baronetage of Nova Scotia
| Preceded by John Dalrymple | Baronet (of Killock); 1810–1853 | Succeeded by North Hamilton Dalrymple |
Peerage of Scotland
| Preceded by John William Henry Dalrymple | Earl of Stair; 1840–1853 | Succeeded by North Hamilton Dalrymple |
Peerage of the United Kingdom
| New creation | Baron Oxenfoord; 1841–1853 | Succeeded by North Hamilton Dalrymple |
