= John Dalrymple, 14th Earl of Stair =

Scottish earl (born 1961)

The Right Honourable The Earl of Stair

Member of the House of Lords
- Lord Temporal
- Hereditary peerage 22 January 1998 – 11 November 1999
- Preceded by: The 13th Earl of Stair
- Succeeded by: Seat abolished
- Elected Hereditary Peer; 29 May 2008 – 29 April 2026
- By-election: 2008
- Preceded by: The 18th Baroness Darcy de Knayth
- Succeeded by: Seat abolished

Personal details
- Born: John David James Dalrymple; 4 September 1961 (age 64)
- Parent(s): John Dalrymple, 13th Earl of Stair; Davina Katherine Bowes-Lyon

John David James Dalrymple, 14th Earl of Stair (born 4 September 1961) is a British politician and a former crossbench member of the House of Lords.

== Background ==
Stair is the eldest child of John Dalrymple, 13th Earl of Stair and Davina Katherine Bowes-Lyon (2 May 1930 – 1 November 2017), daughter of David Bowes-Lyon, brother of Queen Elizabeth The Queen Mother.

Lord Stair's mother, Davina, therefore, was a first cousin of Queen Elizabeth II and he is a second cousin of The King, The Princess Royal, Andrew Mountbatten-Windsor, and The Duke of Edinburgh. Through his mother, he is descended from the Bowes-Lyon, Astor, and Cavendish-Bentinck families. Educated at Harrow School & RMA Sandhurst, he served with 2nd Battalion Scots Guards in the Falklands War. Through his paternal-grandmother, Violet Evelyn Dalrymple (Née Harford), he is a direct descendent of Frederick Calvert, 6th Baron Baltimore, the Calvert family were the founders and Proprietors of the Province of Maryland.

== Political career ==
Upon inheriting his peerage in 1996, Lord Stair entered the House of Lords and sat as a crossbencher. In 1999, the House of Lords Act removed the rights of all hereditary peers to sit in the House; however, ninety-two peers were permitted to remain in the House, elected by other peers. He failed to be elected at that time. Following the death of Davina Ingrams, 18th Baroness Darcy de Knayth in 2008, Lord Stair was elected to the Lords. On 13 October 2011, he made a speech in the Aviation Debate.

== Family ==
Lord Stair married Emily Mary Julia Stonor (daughter of Ralph Stonor, 7th Baron Camoys, and Elizabeth Mary Hyde Parker) in 2006. They have two children.

== Arms ==
Coat of arms of John Dalrymple, 14th Earl of Stair

Coronet
A Coronet of an Earl
Crest
A Rock proper
Escutcheon
Quarterly: 1st grandquarter, Or on a Saltire Azure nine Lozenges of the field (Dalrymple); 2nd grandquarter, Or a Chevron chequy Sable and Argent between three Water Bougets of the second (Ross); 3rd grandquarter, quarterly: 1st and 4th counterquartered: 1st and 4th, Gules three Cinquefoils Ermine; 2nd and 3rd, Argent a Galley sales furled Sable; the whole within a Bordure company Argent and Azure, the first charged with Hearts Gules and the second with Mullets Argent (Hamilton of Bargany); 2nd and 3rd, Gules on a Fess between three Crescents Or as many Mullets Azure (de Franquetot); 4th grandquarter, quarterly: 1st and 4th, Gules on a Chevron between three Cinquefoils Argent as many Round Buckles Azure (Hamilton of Fala); 2nd and 3rd, Gules three Martlets Argent (Makgill)
Supporters
On either side a Stork holding in its beak a Fish all proper
Motto
Firm

Peerage of Scotland
Preceded by John Aymer Dalrymple	Earl of Stair; 1996–present Member of the House of Lords (1998–1999)	Incumbent
Parliament of the United Kingdom
Preceded by The Baroness Darcy de Knayth	Elected hereditary peer to the House of Lords under the House of Lords Act 1999; 2008–2026	Position abolished under the House of Lords (Hereditary Peers) Act 2026
