= John Dalrymple, 7th Earl of Stair =

John William Henry Dalrymple, 7th Earl of Stair (16 November 1784 – 22 March 1840) was the son of General William Dalrymple and Marianne Dorothy Harland. He incurred great scandal over his complicated marital life.

He became the 7th Earl of Stair following the death of his cousin John Dalrymple, 6th Earl of Stair who died without issue.

== Marriages ==
In 1804, Dalrymple—while stationed in Edinburgh—entered into a non-ceremonial marriage with Johanna Gordon, daughter of Charles Gordon of Clunie. Dalrymple subsequently denied any legal relationship with Johanna; Judge William Scott (later Lord Stowell) upheld the validity of the marriage under Scots law in the famous 1811 case of Dalrymple v. Dalrymple.

In the meantime, though, in 1808, Dalrymple married Laura Manners, daughter of John Manners (a Member of Parliament and grandson of the 2nd Duke of Rutland) and Lady Louisa Tollemache (later 7th Countess of Dysart). That marriage was necessarily nullified by the decision in Dalrymple v. Dalrymple. Dalrymple's marriage to Johanna was eventually dissolved in 1820.

== Death ==
Dalrymple died on 22 March 1840, aged 55, in Paris without issue and was succeeded by a cousin.

== Citations ==
- Charles Mosley, editor, Burke's Peerage, Baronetage & Knightage, 107th edition, 3 volumes (Wilmington, Delaware: Burke's Peerage (Genealogical Books) Ltd, 2003), vol. 1, p. 1258.

Peerage of Scotland
Preceded by John Dalrymple	Earl of Stair; 1821–1840	Succeeded by John Hamilton Dalrymple
