= John Dalrymple, 5th Earl of Stair =

Scottish soldier and politician

John Dalrymple, 5th Earl of Stair (1720–1789) was a Scottish soldier and politician.

== Life ==
He was eldest son of George Dalrymple of Dalmahoy, fifth son of John Dalrymple, 1st Earl of Stair, and a baron of the court of exchequer of Scotland, by his wife Euphame, eldest daughter of Sir Andrew Myrton of Gogar. He passed advocate of the Scottish bar in 1741, but he entered the army and attained the rank of captain. He was a favourite with his uncle John Dalrymple, 2nd Earl of Stair, who having in 1707 obtained a new charter containing, in default of male issue, a reversionary clause in favour of any one of the male descendants of the first Viscount Stair whom he should nominate, selected him to succeed him in the states and honours on his own death. He therefore, in 1745, assumed the title, and voted as Earl of Stair in 1747, but by a decision of the House of Lords in 1748 the titles were assigned to his cousin James Dalrymple, who became 3rd Earl of Stair.

John Dalrymple succeeded to the title as fifth earl on the death of his cousin William, William Dalrymple-Crichton, 5th Earl of Dumfries, 4th Earl of Stair, on 27 July 1768. He was chosen a Scottish representative peer in 1771, and in the House of Lords opposed the measures which led to the American War of Independence. He presenting a petition on behalf of Massachusetts in 1774. In the general election of 1774 he was not returned to parliament.

Stair died on 13 October 1789.

== Works ==
Stair wrote pamphlets, mainly on national finance. Their gloomy character and their predictions, earned for him, according to Horace Walpole, the nickname "Cassandra of the State". They included:

- The State of the National Debt, Income, and Expenditure, 1776.
- Considerations preliminary to the fixing the Supplies, the Ways and Means, and the Taxes for the year 1781, 1781.
- Facts and their Consequences submitted to the Consideration of the Public at large, 1782.
- An Attempt to balance the Income and Expenditure of the State, 1783.
- An Argument to prove that it is the indispensable Duty of the Public to insist that Government do forthwith bring forward the consideration of the State of the Nation, 1783.
- State of the Public Debts, 1783.
- On the Proper Limits of Government's Interference with the Affairs of the East India Company, 1784.
- Address to, and Expostulation with, the Public, 1784.
- Comparative State of the Public Revenue for the years ending on 10 October 1783 and 10 Oct. 1784, 1785.

== Family ==
By his wife, a daughter of George Middleton, banker, London, Dalrymple had one son John, who succeeded him as sixth earl.

== Notes ==
Attribution

This article incorporates text from a publication now in the public domain: Stephen, Leslie, ed. (1888). "Dalrymple, John (1720-1789)". Dictionary of National Biography. Vol. 13. London: Smith, Elder & Co.

Peerage of Scotland
Preceded by William Dalrymple-Crichton	Earl of Stair; 1769–1789	Succeeded by John Dalrymple
