= John Dalrymple, 12th Earl of Stair =

Scottish soldier and hereditary peer (1879–1961)

Lieutenant Colonel The Right Honourable The Earl of Stair KT DSO DL

Member of Parliament for Wigtownshire
- In office January 1906 – 2 December 1914
- Preceded by: Sir Herbert Maxwell
- Succeeded by: Hew Hamilton Dalrymple

Personal details
- Born: 1 February 1879
- Died: 4 November 1961 (aged 82)
- Party: Conservative Party; Unionist Party
- Spouse: Violet Evelyn Harford
- Children: Lady Jean Rankin; John Aymer Dalrymple, 13th Earl of Stair; Captain The Hon. Hew North Dalrymple; The Hon. Andrew William Henry Dalrymple; Major The Hon. Colin James Dalrymple
- Military career
- Allegiance: United Kingdom
- Branch: British Army
- Service years: 1898–1917
- Rank: Lieutenant colonel
- Unit: Scots Guards
- Conflicts: Second Boer War: Battle of Diamond Hill; Battle of Bergendal; First World War
- Awards: Knight of the Order of the Thistle; Distinguished Service Order

John James Hamilton Dalrymple, 12th Earl of Stair, KT, DSO, DL (1 February 1879 – 4 November 1961), styled Viscount Dalrymple between 1903 and 1914, was a Scottish soldier and Conservative Party, later Unionist Party, politician.

== Military and political career ==
The son of John Dalrymple, 11th Earl of Stair, Dalrymple was commissioned a second lieutenant in the Scots Guards on 16 February 1898, and promoted to lieutenant on 11 October 1899. He fought in the Second Boer War, where he took part in the march to occupy the Boer capitals Bloemfontein (March 1900) and Pretoria (June 1900), and was present at the successive battles of Diamond Hill (11–12 June 1900) and Bergendal (21–27 August 1900).

Following the end of hostilities in early June 1902, he left Cape Town on board the SS Orotava, and arrived at Southampton the next month. He later fought in the First World War. He was captured by the Germans during the First Battle of Ypres in 1914 and remained a prisoner until 1917 when he was repatriated for medical reasons, due to degradation in his eyesight. He was awarded the Distinguished Service Order in 1919, and retired the same year at the rank of lieutenant colonel.

Lord Dalrymple sat as Member of Parliament for Wigtownshire from 1906 to 1914, when he succeeded his father in the earldom and entered the House of Lords. Lord Stair was later Lord High Commissioner to the General Assembly of the Church of Scotland in 1927 and 1928. From 1931 to 1932 he served as president of the influential conservationist organisation the Cockburn Association.

== Family ==
On 20 October 1904, Dalrymple married Violet Evelyn Harford, only daughter of Col. Frederick Henry Harford and Florence Helen Isabella Parsons, granddaughter of Lawrence Parsons, 2nd Earl of Rosse, and great-granddaughter and heir of Henry Harford, last proprietary governor of Maryland. They had six children:

- Lady Jean Margaret Florence Dalrymple DCVO (15 August 1905 – 3 October 2001); married Lt-Col. Arthur Niall Talbot Rankin, a Scots Guards officer in the Emergency Reserve. She was a lady-in-waiting to Queen Elizabeth The Queen Mother from 1947 to 1982.
- John Aymer Dalrymple, 13th Earl of Stair (9 October 1906 – 26 February 1996)
- Lady Marion Violet Dalrymple (1 February 1908 – 18 June 1995)
- Captain The Honourable Hew North Dalrymple (27 April 1910 – 24 May 2012)
- The Honourable Andrew William Henry Dalrymple (10 May 1914 – 25 December 1945), joint founder of Chilton Aircraft, killed in a plane crash
- Major The Honourable Colin James Dalrymple (19 February 1920 – 12 January 2017)

Parliament of the United Kingdom
Preceded by Sir Herbert Maxwell	Member of Parliament for Wigtownshire; 1906–1914	Succeeded by Hew Hamilton Dalrymple
Honorary titles
Preceded by Sir Herbert Maxwell	Lord Lieutenant of Wigtown; 1935–1961	Succeeded by The Earl of Stair
Masonic offices
Preceded by The Earl of Elgin	Grand Master of the Grand Lodge of Scotland; 1924–1926	Succeeded by The Lord Blythswood
Peerage of Scotland
Preceded by John Dalrymple	Earl of Stair; 1914–1961	Succeeded by John Dalrymple
