= Battle of Wissembourg (1744) =

- Part of War of the Austrian Succession
- Map of Wissembourg in 1750
Date	5 July 1744
Location	Wissembourg, Bas-Rhin, France
Result	French victory

Belligerents
France; Bavaria	Habsburg monarchy

Commanders and leaders
(Kingdom of France) François de Coigny; (Electorate of Bavaria) Friedrich Seckendorff	(Habsburg monarchy) Franz von Nádasdy

Strength
40,000	10,000

Casualties and losses
1,800	1,100

The Battle of Wissembourg or Battle of Weissenburg (5 July 1744) was an engagement won by a Kingdom of France army commanded by François de Franquetot de Coigny over a Habsburg Austrian corps led by Franz Leopold von Nádasdy during the War of the Austrian Succession. In 1744, the Habsburg Empress Maria Theresa ordered a large army under Prince Charles Alexander of Lorraine to invade Alsace, a province belonging to France. At the end of June 1744, Prince Charles outmaneuvered Coigny and crossed the Rhine River. As Coigny retreated south toward Strasbourg he fought with Nádasdy's troops at Wissembourg. When King Frederick II of Prussia suddenly re-entered the war against Austria, Maria Theresa hurriedly recalled Prince Charles' army to help defend Bohemia. The Austrian army was able to recross the Rhine unmolested because King Louis XV of France became seriously ill with smallpox, throwing the French command structure into confusion.

== Background ==
On 28 July 1742, King Frederick II of Prussia and Maria Theresa of the Habsburg monarchy signed the Treaty of Breslau, ending the First Silesian War. This agreement confirmed Prussia's seizure of Lower and Upper Silesia as well as the County of Kladsko (Glatz). The treaty shocked Europe's leaders because it meant that Frederick abandoned his allies, especially France. It also left Austria free to deal with its other enemies. Frederick's Prussia became larger and more threatening, but nobody trusted its unprincipled king.

The Treaty of Breslau added 1.3 million new subjects to the Kingdom of Prussia. King Frederick II used the peace to expand his army to 94,500 infantry and 29,200 cavalry. In January 1744, Frederick prepared to re-enter the war against a revitalized Austria by gaining the cooperation of the Electorate of Bavaria, Electoral Palatinate, and Landgraviate of Hesse-Kassel, and by reopening secret talks with France. Frederick promised to invade Bohemia with 80,000 troops. In return, France would attack the Austrian Netherlands and provide an army to hold Alsace. These actions were designed to pin down enough Austrian forces to make it difficult for the Habsburg monarchy to defend Bohemia.

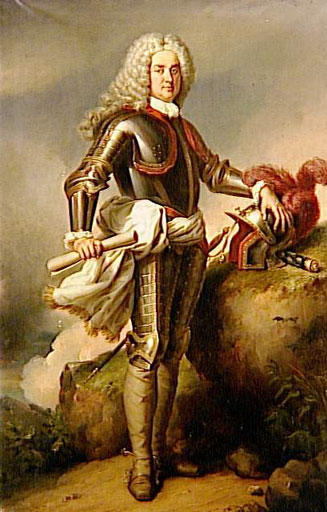
François de Coigny

France deployed four field armies in 1744. Louis François, Prince of Conti commanded 30,000 men in Italy, King Louis XV and Maurice de Saxe led 87,000 troops in Flanders, François d'Harcourt directed 17,000 soldiers in the Duchy of Luxembourg, and Duke François de Franquetot de Coigny had 57,000 men defending the Rhine River. The Allies held the Austrian Netherlands with 65,000 soldiers, including 38,000 men from the Kingdom of Great Britain and the Electorate of Hanover under George Wade, 20,000 men from the Dutch Republic, and 7,000 Austrians. Prince Charles Alexander of Lorraine commanded 80,000 Austrians along the Rhine. The French hoped that Coigny and Harcourt would keep Prince Charles in check.

In the winter of 1743, Maria Theresa determined to attack French possessions along the Rhine River. Though the province of Alsace was part of France, most Alsatians still spoke German, so this area became a target. Her husband Francis Stephen was Duke of Lorraine, a nearby territory that would become part of France when Stanisław Leszczyński died, according to a 1738 treaty. Some of Maria Theresa's advisers suggested that sending an army into Alsace was unwise while the intentions of King Frederick II were unclear. The Austrian queen was not to be deterred. She wrote to one of her generals, "Do not let yourself be troubled by the King of Prussia; do not think of him".

== Operations ==
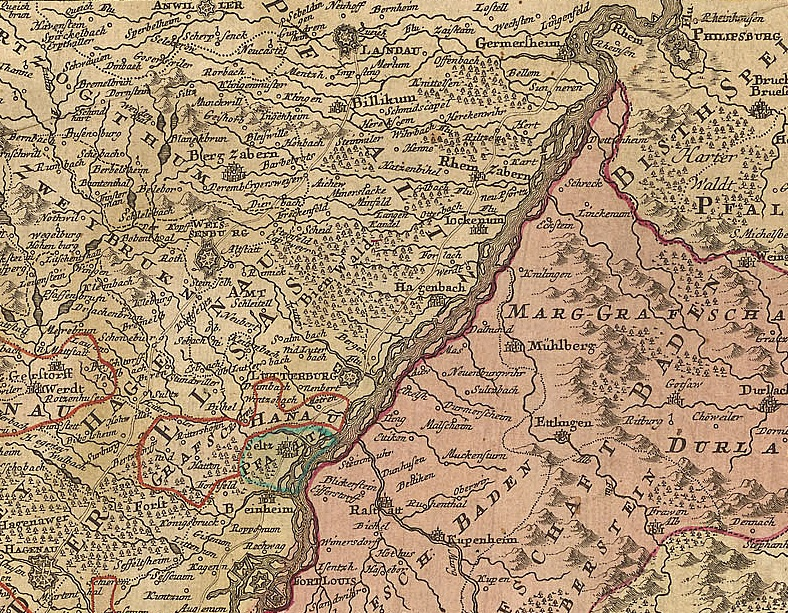
1720 Map of Alsace shows Philipsburg (upper right), Schreck (on river SW of Philipsburg), Lutterburg (center on river), Weissenburg (NW of Lutterburg), Fort Louis (lower center), Hagenau (lower left).

On 17 May 1744, the French Army of Flanders invaded the Austrian Netherlands. The Barrier Treaty called for Dutch garrisons to man the fortresses in the Austrian Netherlands, even though France and the Dutch Republic were technically at peace. The French army began the Siege of Menin on 28 May and accepted the surrender of its Dutch garrison on 5 June. The Siege of Ypres lasted from 15 to 24 June when its Dutch defenders capitulated. Fort Knokke surrendered after a few hours on 29 June. The Siege of Furnes (Veurne) ran from 30 June to 11 July when its 1,000-man Dutch garrison capitulated.

On 20 June 1744, as Coigny's soldiers were celebrating the fall of Menin by firing their weapons in the air, Johann Leopold Bärnklau, his subordinate Leopold Joseph von Daun, and their Austrian troops suddenly crossed the Rhine at Stockstadt am Rhein. Bärnklau's men moved into the Kühkopf, a loop in the river between Mainz and Mannheim and rapidly fortified the open western end of the loop. Alarmed, Coigny shifted troops north to contain the bridgehead, but he found it was too strong for the French to attack. Coigny also ordered Friedrich Heinrich von Seckendorff and his allied Bavarian soldiers to withdraw from their position at Philippsburg on the east bank. Prince Charles also deceived Coigny by launching feints farther north near Mainz.

The real blow fell on the night of 30 June 1744 when Franz Leopold von Nádasdy and Baron Franz von der Trenck crossed the Rhine at Schreck south of Philippsburg with 9,000 Pandurs and hussars. Nádasdy's troops surprised and drove off three Bavarian regiments under Seckendorff. Bridges were rapidly constructed and Prince Charles crossed to the west bank with his 70,000-strong army on 2 July. Though the successful operation was suggested by Nádasdy, it was executed by Prince Charles' adviser, Otto Ferdinand von Abensperg und Traun. (Note: Carlyle said Nádasdy's river crossing was carried out by 6,000 Pandurs while Cust asserted that it was done by 9,000 Pandurs and hussars (Cust, p. 54).)

== Alsace ==
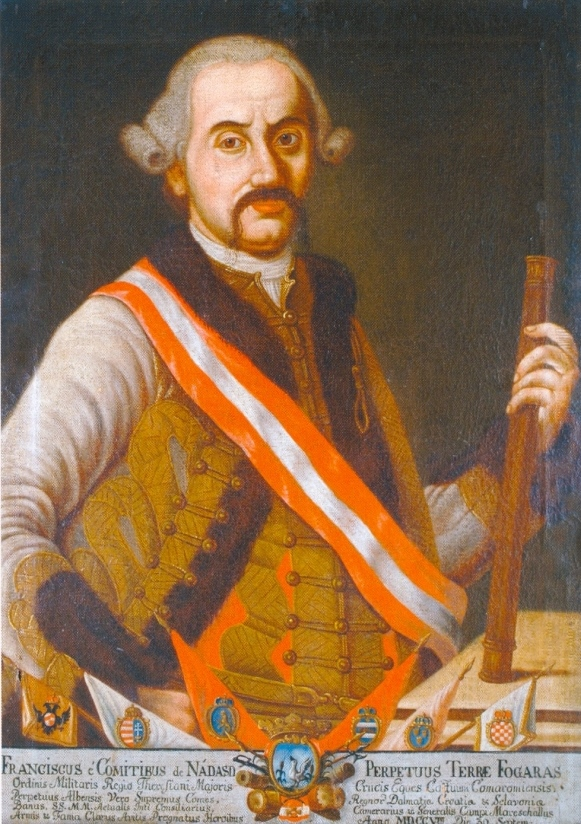
Franz von Nádasdy

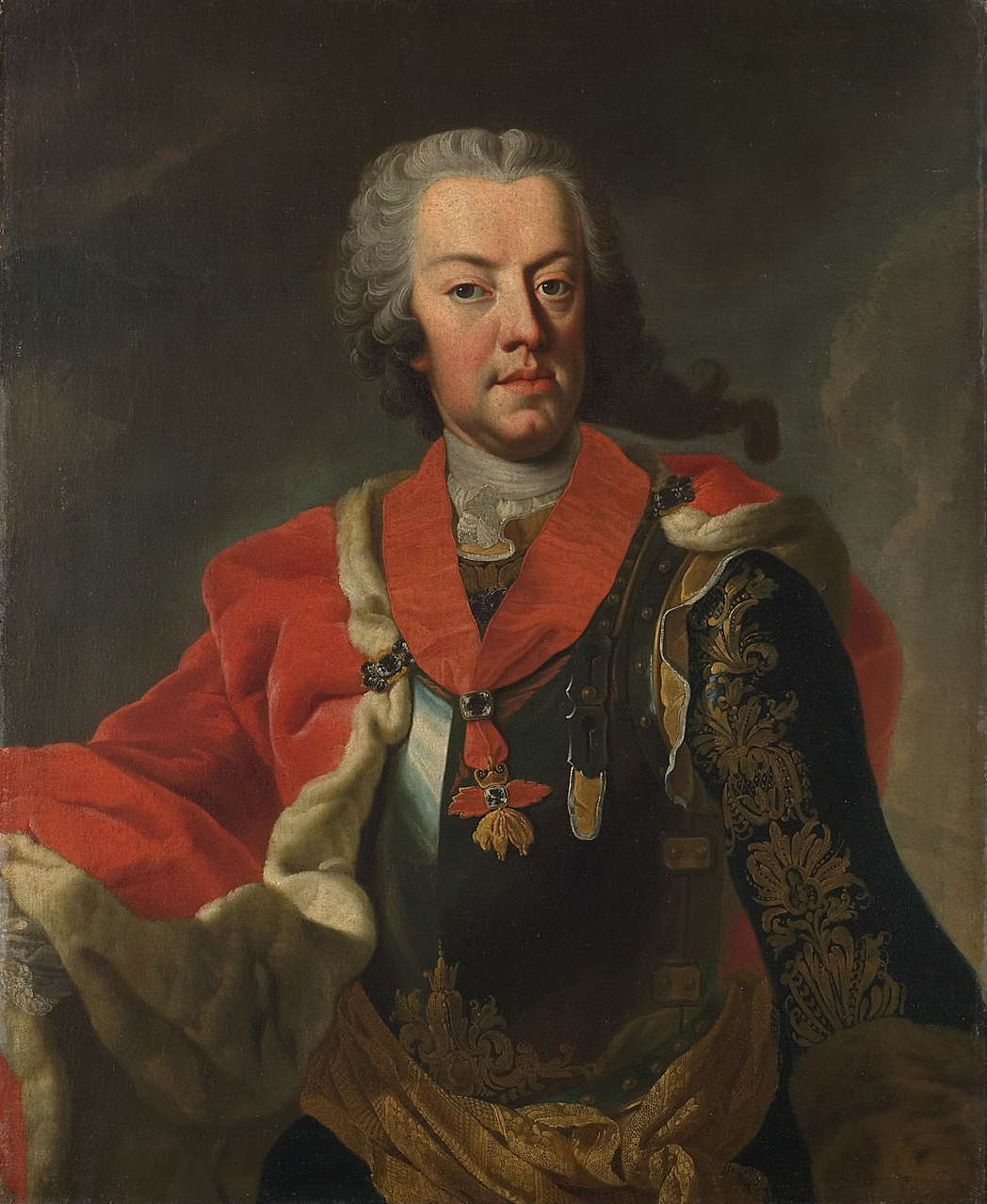
Charles of Lorraine

On 4 July 1744, Prince Charles with 10,000 men appeared before the Lines of Weissenburg at Lauterbourg (Lutterburg). The Lauterbourg garrison consisted of 500 regulars and 1,200 militia under Lieutenant General De Gensac. In the Capitulation of Lauterbourg, the badly outnumbered French surrendered the fort and their weapons; they were allowed free passage without the honors of war. At the same time, part of the Austrian army occupied Wissembourg.

After blaming Seckendorff for the setback, Coigny gathered his army and hurried south to protect Alsace. He also sent messengers begging for help. On 5 July 1744, Coigny with 40,000 French and Bavarians bumped into Nádasdy with 10,000 Austrians at Wissembourg. After some fighting, the Austrians were pushed out of the way so that Coigny could continue marching south to Lampertheim to defend Strasbourg. The fighting cost the Franco–Bavarians 1,800 casualties, including 1,500 killed and wounded plus 300 captured. French Mestre de camp Baron de Girard and Bavarian Generalfeldwachtmeister Waldenheim were killed. The Austrians suffered 1,100 casualties, including 650 killed and wounded plus 450 captured. The historian, Reed Browning, called Wissembourg "a meaningless engagement".

Prince Charles occupied many Alsatian towns and blockaded Fort-Louis. The Austrian threat compelled Stanisław Leszczyński to quit Lunéville and move to a safer location. In the so-called "affair of the wigs", the valets of a small French detachment panicked and rode off after leaving their officers in the ditch. Prince Charles wrote to his wife that he would soon be writing from Paris, but he began to have second thoughts. The Austrian army had its back to a major river with Harcourt's army approaching from the Moselle valley. On 20 July, King Louis XV and Adrien Maurice de Noailles, 3rd Duke of Noailles began marching south with 32,000 troops from the Army of Flanders after hearing the news that Alsace was invaded. Maurice de Saxe was left in Flanders with 55,000 soldiers to face the Allied army; his instructions forbade offensive operations. The result was a stalemate between Saxe and Wade in Flanders.

Frederick II waited until Prince Charles was committed in Alsace before making his move. The authorities in Vienna warned Prince Charles on 8 August 1744 that Prussia was about to attack and recalled most of his army from Alsace. On 14 August, 80,000 Prussians crossed the Bohemian frontier and on 15 August, Prussia formally declared war. The dilemma for Austria was that her main army was 400 mi (640 km) away on the wrong side of the Rhine River. This action, which started the Second Silesian War, led Maria Theresa to renounce all her obligations in the Treaty of Breslau.

With the situation looking grim for the Habsburg monarchy, the Austrian cause received a stroke of luck when King Louis XV became sick with smallpox at Metz on 8 August. The French Queen and the royal family at the Palace of Versailles rushed to Metz to pay their last respects. The king lay near death for a week and began slowly to recover on 15 August. The king's illness paralyzed the French war effort. Prince Charles courted battle, but the French never attacked him, though they were superior in numbers. The army of Prince Charles recrossed the Rhine on 23 August against feeble opposition. King Frederick II was furious at the French for allowing the Austrians to escape so easily.

== Aftermath ==
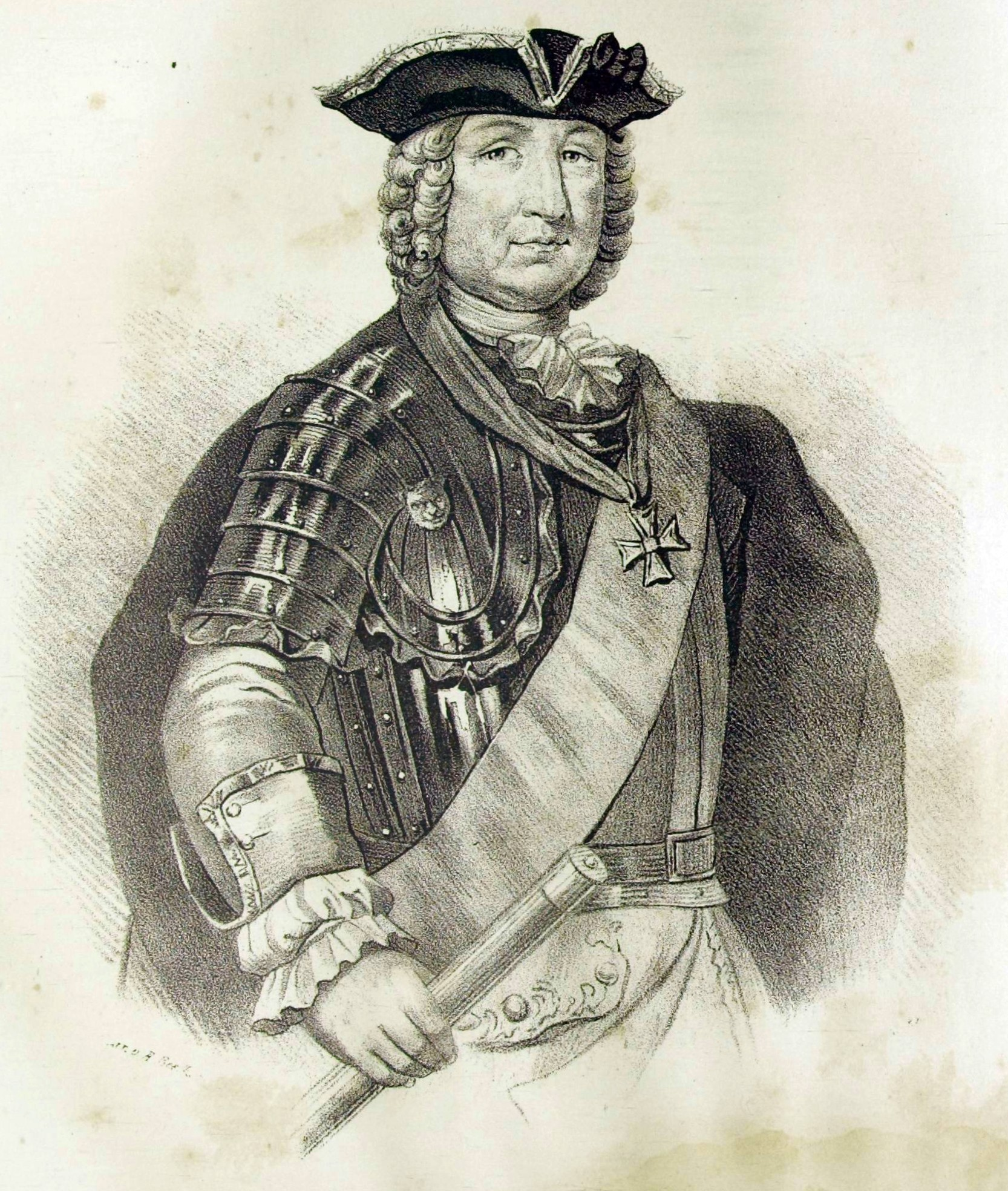
Friedrich Seckendorff

Prince Charles marched "with incredible expedition" to Donauwörth. Instead of marching in pursuit, the French sat down at the Siege of Fribourg in the Breisgau and sent Seckendorff to pursue Prince Charles. Seckendorff followed the Austrian retreat at a respectful distance. Joined by allied troops from Hesse-Kassel and the Palatinate, Seckendorff turned aside to reconquer Bavaria, which had been evacuated by its Austrian garrison. Prince Charles' army reached Waldmünchen on the border of Bohemia on 26 September 1744.

On 2 October 1744, Prince Charles and Károly József Batthyány merged their two armies and marched to oppose the Prussians. On 22 October, they were joined by an army of 20,000 Saxons. The Siege of Prague ended when it surrendered to the Prussians on 16 September but the 1744 Prussian campaign in Bohemia ended in disaster. Prince Charles' adviser Traun was the mastermind of a strategy that evicted Frederick from Bohemia without a major battle.

== Notes ==
Footnotes

Citations
