= Louis Gonzaga Mendez Jr. =

American World War II officer (1915–2001)

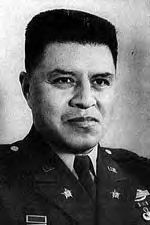
- Colonel Louis Gonzaga Mendez Jr.
- Born: July 14, 1915; Trinidad, Colorado, U.S.
- Died: September 19, 2001 (aged 86); Falls Church, Virginia, U.S.
- Burial place: Arlington National Cemetery
- Military career
- Allegiance: United States
- Branch: United States Army
- Service years: 1940–1970
- Rank: Colonel
- Commands: 3rd Battalion, 508th Parachute Infantry Regiment, 82nd Airborne Division
- Conflicts: World War II
- Awards: Distinguished Service Cross; Bronze Star (3)
- Other work: Infantry instructor at Fort Benning, Georgia; Military attaché in Spain (1950)

Colonel Louis Gonzaga Mendez Jr. (July 14, 1915 – September 19, 2001) was a highly decorated United States Army officer of the 82nd Airborne Division who in June 1944, as commander of the 3rd Battalion, 508th Parachute Infantry Regiment during World War II, parachuted behind enemy lines into Normandy and was awarded a Distinguished Service Cross for leading an attack that captured the French town of Prétot-Sainte-Suzanne, in the Manche (Basse-Normandie) department. On June 6, 2002, the people of the village honored his memory by renaming Prétot's main square "La Place du Colonel Mendez".

== Early years ==
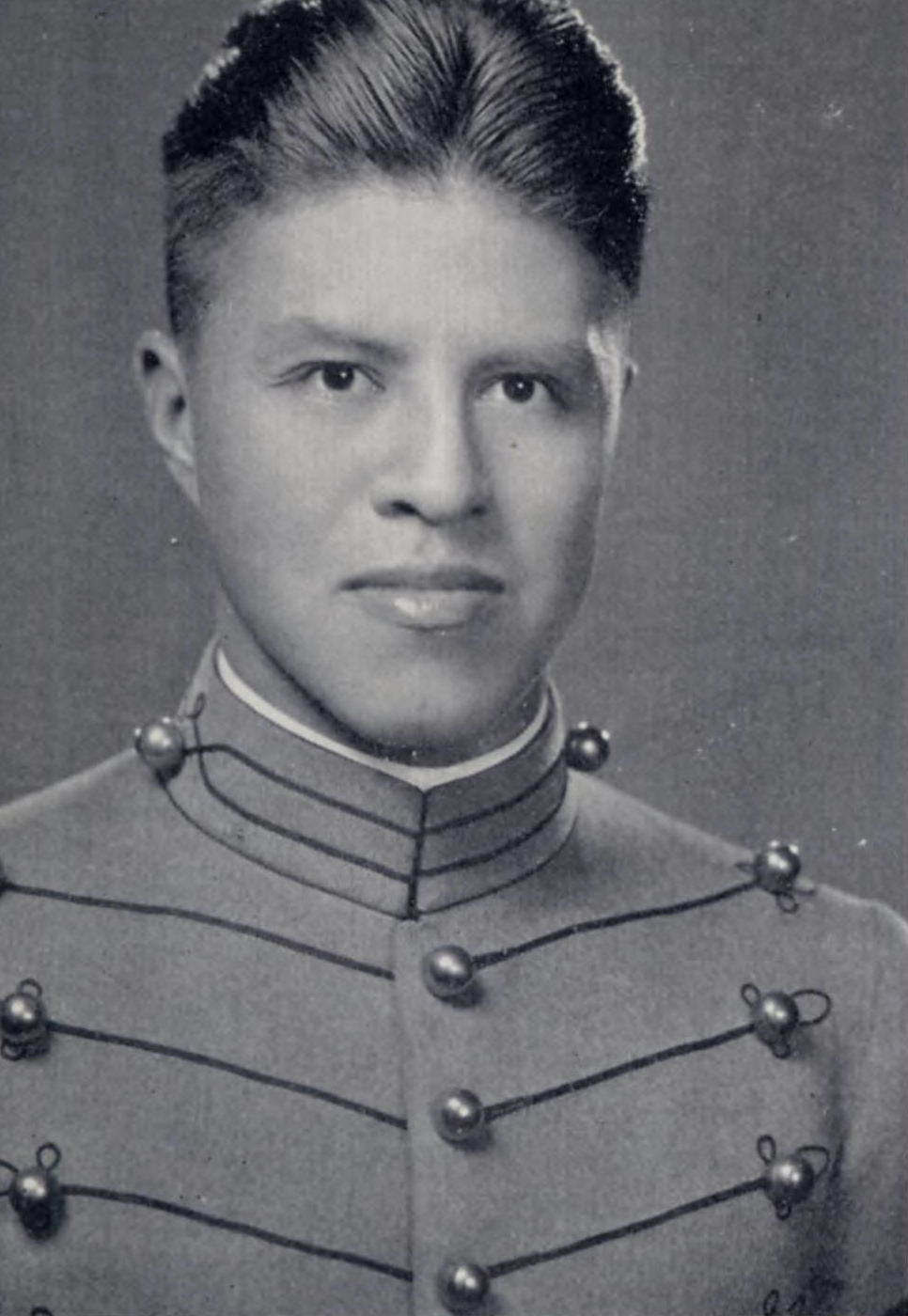
Mendez as a West Point cadet in 1940

Louis Gonzaga Mendez, a Mexican American, Spanish and Navajo Indian, was born in Trinidad, Colorado, on July 14, 1915. He graduated top of his class in high school. After serving in the Civilian Conservation Corps (CC), Mendez was appointed by Governor Bob Carr to the United States Military Academy at West Point, New York. He graduated from West Point in the Class of 1940, and was commissioned as a second lieutenant in the United States Army. Mendez earned his Parachutist Badge after attending the Army's United States Army Airborne School.

== World War II ==
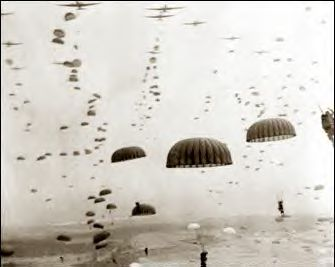
82nd Airborne Division behind enemy lines

The United States entered World War II in December 1941, after which Mendez was eventually assigned to the 82nd Airborne Division. He rose to become commander of the 3rd Battalion, 508th Parachute Infantry Regiment.

On June 5–6, 1944, the paratroopers of the 82nd's three parachute infantry regiments and reinforced glider infantry regiment, who were stationed in England, boarded hundreds of transport planes and gliders and began the largest airborne assault in history. They were among the first soldiers to fight in Normandy, France.

According to an article by Richard Pearson in the Washington Post, Mendez and his men were dropped behind German lines with the mission to "disrupt enemy communications, seize vital crossroads, destroy enemy supplies and kill enemy troops to aid the seaborne D-Day assaults on the Normandy beaches". Mendez and his men proceeded to capture the town of "Prétot Ste Suzanne". Mendez was awarded the Distinguished Service Cross, second only to the Medal of Honor.

After the fighting in Normandy, Mendez continued to lead his battalion, which took part in Operation Market Garden, in September 1944. A combined US-British operation, according to the Arlington Cemetery website, it "sought to secure strategic river crossings behind German lines in the Low Countries". Although, elements of the operation proved unsuccessful, the 82nd Airborne Division was able to capture its objectives.

The Germans began a counter-offensive along the Western Front in December 1944, resulting in the Battle of the Bulge. Having been taken by surprise, Allied troops were initially pushed back from the front, before launching a counterattack two days later. This effort included Mendez and his battalion, "who advanced as infantrymen", halting General Gerd von Rundstedt's advance in the north.

== Post-World War II ==
Mendez continued his academic education and military career after the war. He graduated from the Command and General Staff College and the Industrial College of the Armed Forces. He went on to earn a master's degree in international relations from Georgetown University and was an instructor at the Infantry School at Fort Benning, Georgia. In 1950, he took up a post as a military attaché to Spain, and in the 1960s served in the 1st Cavalry Division in South Korea as a regimental commander. Later, he undertook postings in the War Histories Division on the Army General Staff and as Secretary of the Organization of American States' Inter-American Defense Board. Mendez retired from the military in 1970; his final post was at the Industrial College of Warfare in Washington, D.C.

== Later years ==
As a civilian, Mendez joined the Virginia Education Department. According to Pearson, Mendez "was national director of the Right to Read Program, an assistant education commissioner and chief of the department's Vocational and Adult Education Branch" before retiring in 1985.

During a ceremony held on March 31, 2001 in which one of Mendez's men, Francis Lamoureux, was awarded the Bronze Star after 50 years, Lamoureux had this to say about his former commander:

"There are so many other men who deserve medals more than I do who haven't received medals. So, what makes it special is the fact that Colonel Mendez is going to make that presentation to me. I really am honored by that."

Colonel Mendez, who was married and had six sons and six daughters, died at home of a stroke on Wednesday, September 19, 2001, in Falls Church, Virginia. He was buried with full military honors one week later at Arlington National Cemetery.

Mendez was honored on June 6, 2002, for his gallantry leading his men against the enemy and liberating Prétot-Vicquemare when the people of the village renamed its main square "La Place du Colonel Mendez". In his book, A Bridge Too Far, historian Cornelius Ryan highlighted Colonel Mendez's leadership style, recounting a speech he gave to the Allied pilots flying his battalion to the drop zone during Operation Market Garden.

In October 2017, the Fairfax County School Board decided to rename J.E.B. Stuart High School as Justice High School, effective July 2018. The new name was intended to honor Colonel Mendez, along with Thurgood Marshall and Barbara Rose Johns, each of whom had worked towards advancing justice.

== Military decorations and awards ==
=== Distinguished Service Cross ===
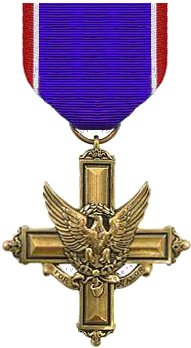

Citation:

The President of the United States of America, authorized by Act of Congress, July 9, 1918, takes pleasure in presenting the Distinguished Service Cross to Lieutenant Colonel (Infantry) Louis Gonzaga Mendez, Jr. (ASN: 0-23262), United States Army, for extraordinary heroism in connection with military operations against an armed enemy while serving as Commanding Officer, 3d Battalion, 508th Parachute Infantry Regiment, 82d Airborne Division, in action against enemy forces during the period 6 June 1944 through 7 July 1944, in France. One instance of particular note was on 20 June 1944, near Pretot, France, when Lieutenant Colonel Mendez personally led an assault on the town of Pretot through a withering concentration of observed mortar, timed artillery and machine gun cross-fire. In their first attempt to win their objective, the two assault companies were pinned to the ground by a devastating artillery barrage and suffered heavy casualties. Appreciating the danger of delay, Lieutenant Colonel Mendez crawled to a position in front of his men, leaped to his feet and led the charge which drove the enemy out of the town. By his calm disregard for personal danger and his ability to act quickly and aggressively under fire, he turned imminent catastrophe into a victory. Lieutenant Colonel Mendez's courage, calmness, judgment and devotion to duty were directly responsible for the achievement of his battalion's objective, and exemplify the highest traditions of the military forces of the United States and reflect great credit upon himself, the 82d Airborne Division, and the United States Army.

=== Commendations ===

Badge	Combat Infantryman Badge			
1st Row	Distinguished Service Cross		Bronze Star with 2 Oak leaf clusters	American Defense Service Medal
2nd Row	American Campaign Medal	European-African-Middle Eastern Campaign Medal	World War II Victory Medal	National Defense Service Medal
Badge	Master Parachutist Badge			
Unit award	Presidential Unit Citation			

== See also ==
- Hispanic Americans in World War II
