= Lithaire =

- Part of Montsenelle
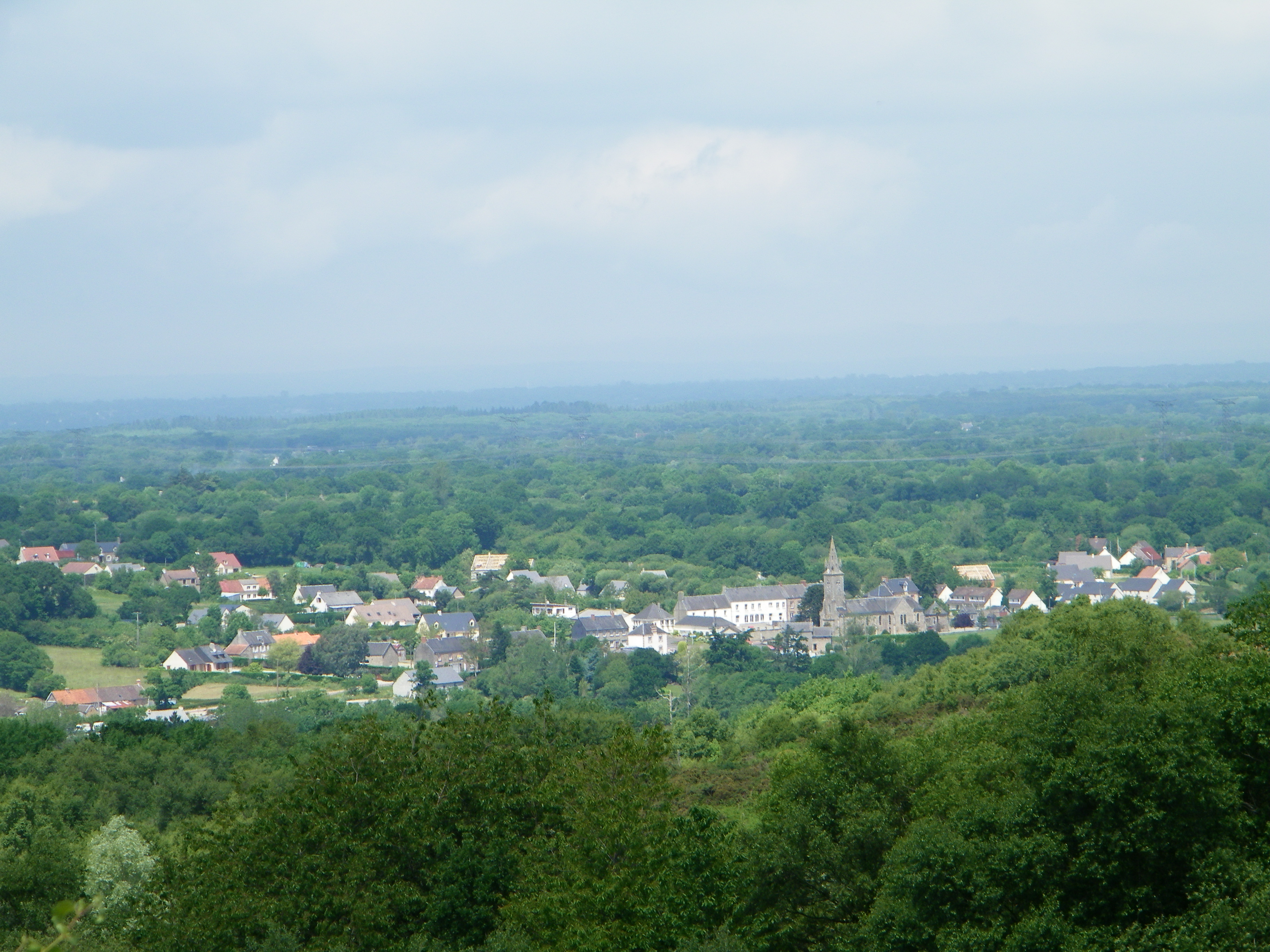
- The village seen from Mont Castre
- Location of Lithaire
- Location within France Location within Normandy
- Coordinates: 49°18′03″N 1°28′56″W
- Country: France
- Region: Normandy
- Department: Manche
- Arrondissement: Coutances
- Canton: Créances
- Commune: Montsenelle
- Area^{1}: 14.21 km^{2} (5.49 sq mi)
- Elevation: 36 m (118 ft)
- Highest elevation: 123 m (404 ft)
- Lowest elevation: 15 m (49 ft)
- Population (2022): 599
  - Density: 42.2/km^{2} (109/sq mi)
- Time zone: UTC+01:00 (CET)
  - Summer (DST): UTC+02:00 (CEST)
- Postal code: 50250
- ^{1} French Land Register data, which excludes lakes, ponds, glaciers > 1 km^{2} (0.386 sq mi or 247 acres) and river estuaries.

Lithaire (French pronunciation: [litɛʁ]) is a former commune in the Manche department in Normandy in north-western France. On 1 January 2016, it was merged into the new commune of Montsenelle.

== See also ==
- Communes of the Manche department
