= Montsenelle =

- Commune
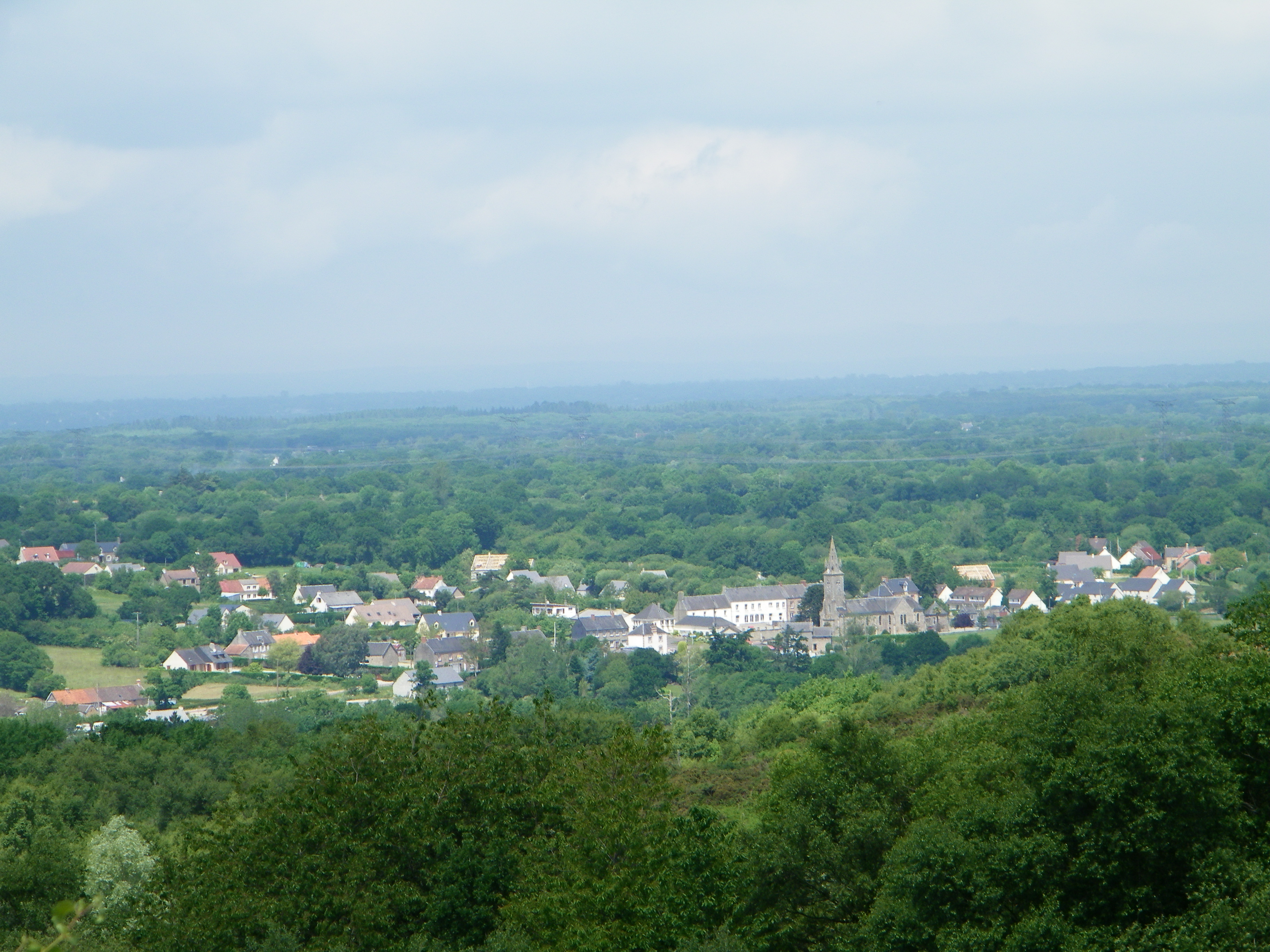
- A general view of Lithaire
- Location of Montsenelle
- Location within France Location within Normandy
- Coordinates: 49°18′00″N 1°29′06″W
- Country: France
- Region: Normandy
- Department: Manche
- Arrondissement: Coutances
- Canton: Créances

Government
  - Mayor (2020–2026): Thierry Renaud
- Area^{1}: 43.08 km^{2} (16.63 sq mi)
- Population (2023): 1,450
  - Density: 33.7/km^{2} (87.2/sq mi)
- Time zone: UTC+01:00 (CET)
  - Summer (DST): UTC+02:00 (CEST)
- INSEE/Postal code: 50273 /50250
- ^{1} French Land Register data, which excludes lakes, ponds, glaciers > 1 km^{2} (0.386 sq mi or 247 acres) and river estuaries.

Montsenelle (French pronunciation: [mɔ̃sənɛl]) is a commune in the department of Manche, northwestern France. The municipality was established on 1 January 2016 by merger of the former communes of Coigny, Lithaire (the seat), Prétot-Sainte-Suzanne and Saint-Jores.

== See also ==
- Communes of the Manche department
