= Coigny =

- Part of Montsenelle
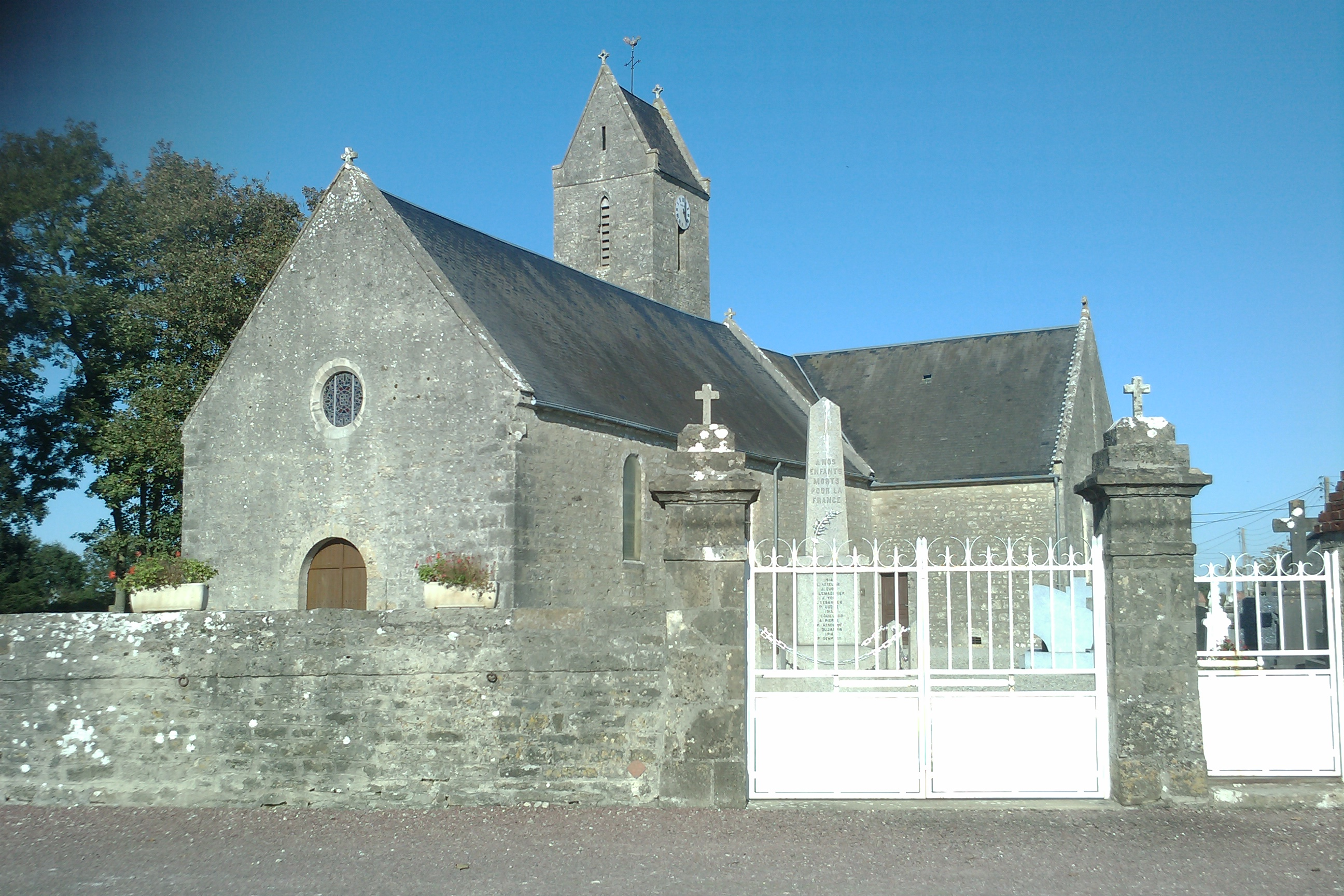
- The church of Saint-Pierre
- Location of Coigny
- Location within France Location within Normandy
- Coordinates: 49°19′26″N 1°22′58″W
- Country: France
- Region: Normandy
- Department: Manche
- Arrondissement: Coutances
- Canton: Créances
- Commune: Montsenelle
- Area^{1}: 4.50 km^{2} (1.74 sq mi)
- Elevation: 30 m (98 ft)
- Highest elevation: 36 m (118 ft)
- Lowest elevation: 4 m (13 ft)
- Population (2022): 168
  - Density: 37.3/km^{2} (96.7/sq mi)
- Time zone: UTC+01:00 (CET)
  - Summer (DST): UTC+02:00 (CEST)
- Postal code: 50250
- ^{1} French Land Register data, which excludes lakes, ponds, glaciers > 1 km^{2} (0.386 sq mi or 247 acres) and river estuaries.

Coigny (French pronunciation: [kwaɲi]) is a former commune in the Manche department in Normandy in north-western France. On 1 January 2016, it was merged into the new commune of Montsenelle.

== People linked to the commune ==
- Robert Jean Antoine de Franquetot de Coigny (1652–1704)
- François de Franquetot de Coigny (1670–1759), Marshal of France
- François-Henri de Franquetot de Coigny (1737–1821), Marshal of France

== See also ==
- Communes of the Manche department
