= Franz Leopold von Nádasdy =

Austrian Field Marshal and Ban of Croatia

Count Franz Leopold von Nádasdy auf Fogaras
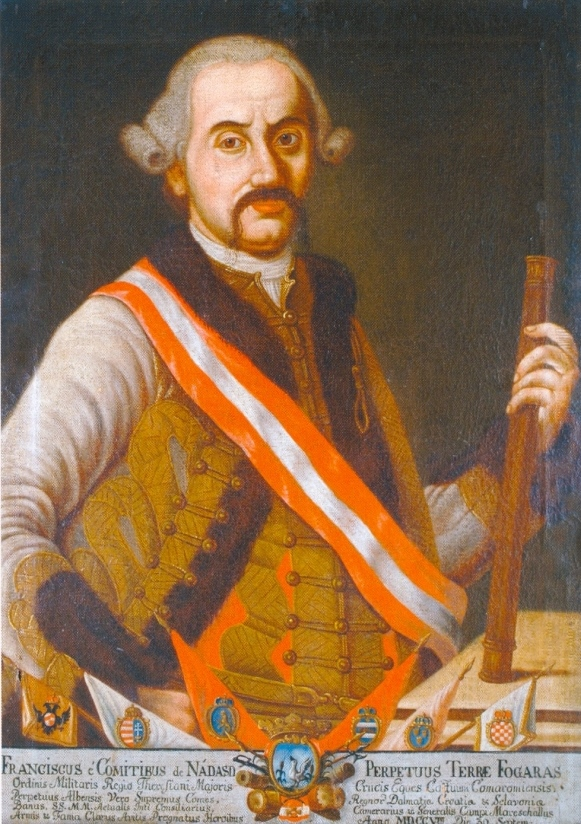
- Born: September 30, 1708; Radkersburg, Austria
- Died: March 22, 1783 (aged 74); Karlstadt, Croatia
- Military career
- Allegiance: Holy Roman Empire
- Branch: Imperial Army
- Rank: Field Marshal
- Conflicts: Corsican War of Independence; War of the Polish Succession; Austro-Turkish War; War of the Austrian Succession; Battle of Wissembourg (1744); Battle of Soor (1745); Battle of Piacenza (1746); Second Silesian War; Third Silesian War; Battle of Kolin (1757); Battle of Moys (1757); Battle of Leuthen (1757); War of the Bavarian Succession
- Awards: Military Order of Maria Theresa (Grand Cross)
- Other work: Ban of Croatia

Franz Leopold von Nádasdy auf Fogaras (1708–1783) was an Austrian Field Marshal who fought in numerous wars of the 18th century. He notably served in the Third Silesian War, having a prominent role in several key battles including Kolin and Leuthen. He also served as the Imperial Ban of Croatia.

== Biography ==
Franz Leopold von Nádasdy auf Fogaras was born on 30 September 1708 in Radkersburg, Austria into a Hungarian family of old nobility. He was the son of Count Franz Nádasdy and Countess Rosa Nádasdy von Schrattenbach. He entered service of the Holy Roman Empire in the 9th Hussar Regiment in 1727, participating in the intervention in the Corsican War of Independence and the War of the Polish Succession. In 1735 he became Colonel of the 8th Hussar Regiment, fought in the Austro-Turkish War and then led the 9th Hussar Regiment. In 1741 he was promoted to Generalfeldwachtmeister. When the War of the Austrian Succession began he was put in charge of the advance guard of Prince Charles of Lorraine's army.

Through the early war Nádasdy commanded cavalry in campaigns in Bohemia, Bavaria and along the Rhine against French, Bavarian and Prussian troops. He led Prince Charles' successful crossing of the Rhine at Schreck near Philippsburg, allowing bridges to be built so the main army could cross on 2 July 1744. Nádasdy was defeated by the French and Bavarians in the Battle of Wissembourg on 5 July. Though outnumbered 40,000 to 10,000, the Austrians inflicted 1,800 casualties on their foes while losing only 1,100 men. At the Battle of Soor on 30 September 1745, the Austrian army was defeated, but Nádasdy and his light troops raided the Prussian camp, seizing the war chest with 85,000 thalers and most of the enemy's baggage.

Nádasdy continued to serve in the Second Silesian War against Prussia and in 1745 he was promoted to Feldmarschall-Leutnant, commanding a detachment of light troops, before going to Italy in 1746. There he fought in the Battle of Piacenza and participated in the operations against the Republic of Genua. In 1754 he was promoted to General der Kavallerie and in 1756 was made Ban of Croatia. When the Third Silesian War began he led Croatian troops in support of Field Marshal Leopold Joseph von Daun. Nádasdy commanded the cavalry on the right wing in the Battle of Kolin, contributing to the major victory. For his services there he was the third man (after Daun and Prince Charles) to be awarded the Grand Cross of the new Military Order of Maria Theresa. As a corps commander he was victorious at Moys and then fought at Breslau.

At the Battle of Leuthen Nádasdy's mixed corps was composed of various Imperial troops and contingents from Bavaria and Württemberg. It formed the separate left wing of the Austrian lines, south of Leuthen. Frederick II of Prussia lured the Austrians into sending their reserves to the north while then appearing to leave the battlefield southwards. Instead of marching off the Prussian right wing, the strong part of their oblique formation, fell into the Austrian left flank, Nádasdy's corps. Nádasdy's calls for reinforcements before the Prussian attack were not answered and his troops were forced back. A counterattack by his cavalry was unable to turn the tide and while his retreating troops, under heavy losses, bought time for the finally sent reinforcements from the center the latter arrived piecemeal, not able to halt the enemy. The Austrians eventually changing front did not save the day for them, and the beaten Imperials retreated towards Schweidnitz, Nádasdy leading a rear guard on the far side of the Schweidnitz river bridges.

Afterwards, in early 1758, Nádasdy was promoted to Field Marshal and left the war, returning to Croatia. There the viceroy continued to organize the Grenz infantry and other border troops on the Balkan. He was recalled to active service during the War of the Bavarian Succession to command the army in Galicia, then retired again. He died on March 22, 1783, at Karlstadt in Croatia. He had been married twice - first to Maria Maximiliana von Rottal (1721–1756), fathering several children, then to Maria Susanna von Rabatinsky (1717–1786).

== Footnotes ==
Political offices
| Preceded by Károly József Batthyány | Ban of Croatia; 1756–1783 | Succeeded by Ferenc Esterházy |
