= François de Franquetot de Coigny =

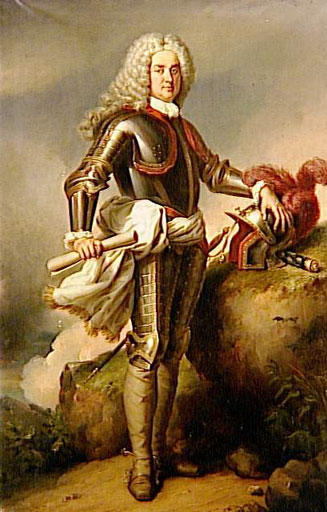
Portrait by Jean-Baptiste Paulin Guérin, 1834

François de Franquetot de Coigny (French pronunciation: [fʁɑ̃swa də fʁɑ̃kto də kwaɲi]; 16 March 1670 – 18 December 1759) was a Marshal of France, Count, and from 1747, the Duke of Coigny.

== Biography ==
He was born in Coigny château near Coutances, Normandy, into an old French noble family as son of Robert-Jean de Coigny, and his wife, Marie-Françoise de Matignon (1648-1719). His maternal uncle was Charles Auguste de Goyon, Count of Gacé (1647-1729), Marshal of France and his cousin Jacques I, Prince of Monaco. Like his father he pursued a military career. He became brigadier in 1702, Maréchal de camp in 1703 and lieutenant general in 1709.

In 1719, during the War of the Quadruple Alliance, he served in the army on the borders with Spain, and contributed in taking Fuenterrabía, San Sebastián, Castellciutat and La Seu d'Urgell.
In 1725, he was appointed Governor of the Principality of Sedan.

Recalled to arms in 1733, his most notable victories were at San Pietro and Guastalla, which he won in 1734 together with Marshal de Broglie against the Austrians in the War of Polish Succession. He was made a Marshal of France in 1734.

In the War of the Austrian Succession he replaced Marshal de Broglie in 1743 to defend the French positions on the Rhine. He Wissembourg and Fribourg. This was his last campaign.

He received the French Order of the Holy Spirit (1724) and the Spanish Order of the Golden Fleece (1734).

In the 1720s he was a member of the Club de l'Entresol, an early modern think tank.

== Family ==
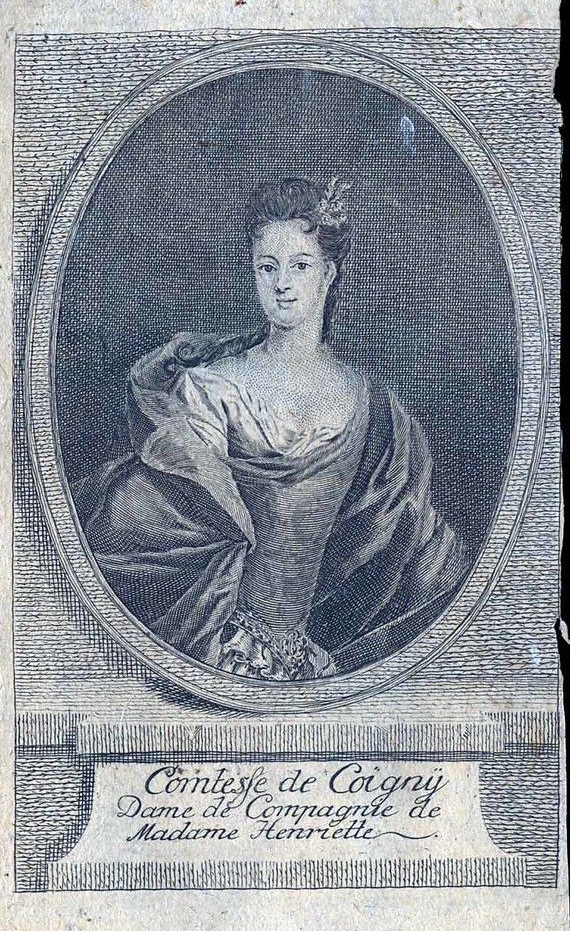
Marie Thérèse de Coigny, lady in waiting to Henriette of France

He married Henriette de Montbourcher du Bordage (1671-1751) on 4 December 1699; they had five children, one son and four daughters:

- Marie-Françoise Adélaïde (b. 1700)
- Jean Antoine François, Marquis de Coigny (1702–1748), killed in a duel against Louis Auguste de Bourbon, Prince of Dombes, married Marie Thérèse Josèphe Corentine de Névet (1717-1778), lady in waiting to Henriette of France and had issue
- Charlotte-Bibiane (1703–1772), married Jean Baptiste Joachim Colbert, Marquis de Croissy (1703-1777) and had issue
- Henriette (1703-1772), married Jean-Baptiste Colbert de Torcy, Marquis de Croissy-en-Brie (1703-1777) and had issue
- Élisabeth Marie (b. 1705)

His grandson was François-Henri de Franquetot de Coigny, also a Marshal of France.

== Death ==
François de Franquetot, Duke de Coigny died on 18 December 1759, at the age of 89, having outlived his son, and his wife Henriette by 8 years.
