= Saint-Jores =

- Part of Montsenelle
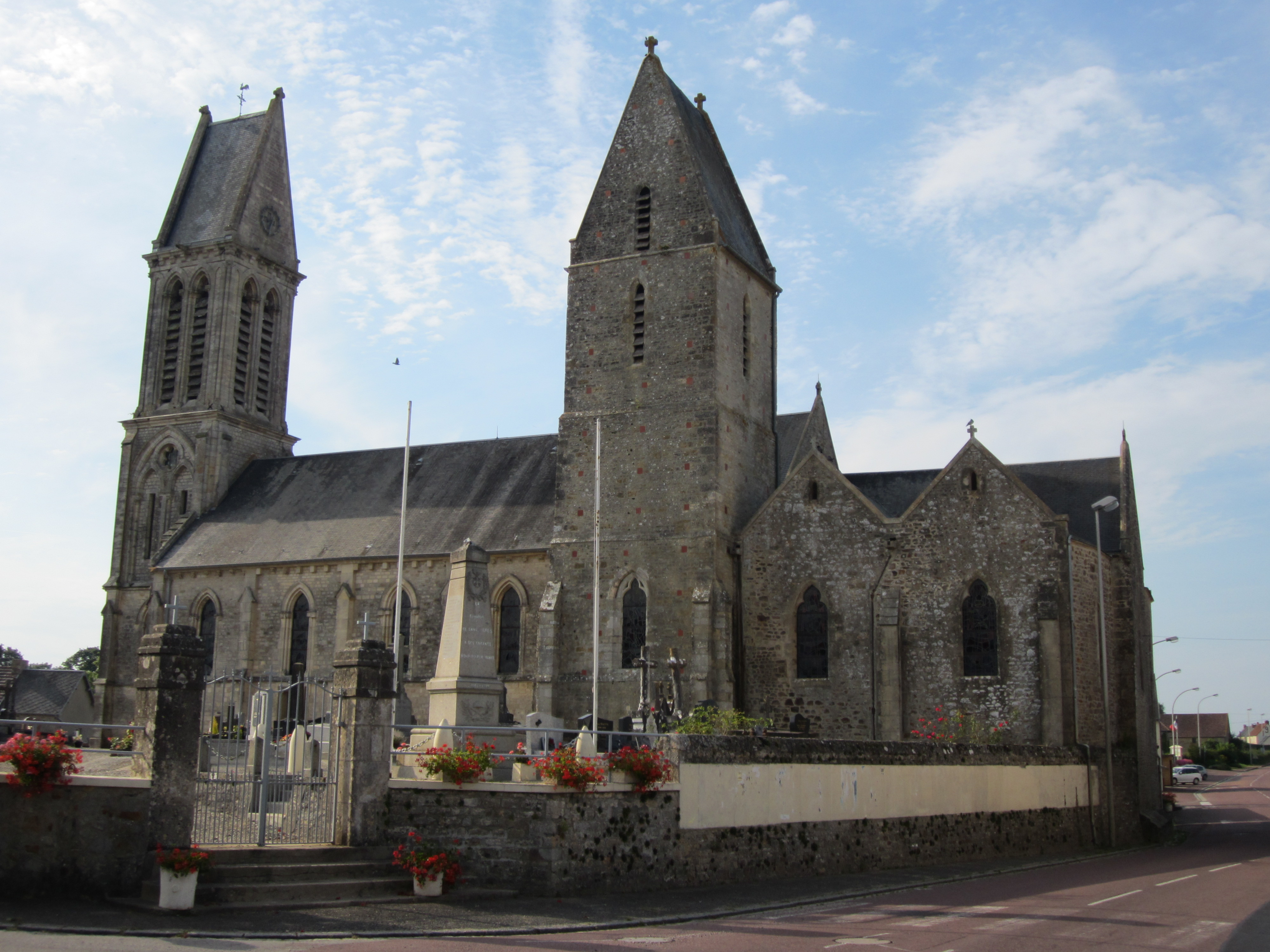
- The church of Saint-Georges
- Location of Saint-Jores
- Location within France Location within Normandy
- Coordinates: 49°18′13″N 1°25′14″W
- Country: France
- Region: Normandy
- Department: Manche
- Arrondissement: Coutances
- Canton: Créances
- Commune: Montsenelle
- Area^{1}: 12.73 km^{2} (4.92 sq mi)
- Elevation: 38 m (125 ft)
- Highest elevation: 44 m (144 ft)
- Lowest elevation: 1 m (3.3 ft)
- Population (2022): 375
  - Density: 29.5/km^{2} (76.3/sq mi)
- Time zone: UTC+01:00 (CET)
  - Summer (DST): UTC+02:00 (CEST)
- Postal code: 50250
- ^{1} French Land Register data, which excludes lakes, ponds, glaciers > 1 km^{2} (0.386 sq mi or 247 acres) and river estuaries.

Saint-Jores (French pronunciation: [sɛ̃ ʒɔʁ]) is a former commune in the Manche department in Normandy in north-western France. On 1 January 2016, it was merged into the new commune of Montsenelle.

== See also ==
- Communes of the Manche department
