= Robert Jean Antoine de Franquetot de Coigny =

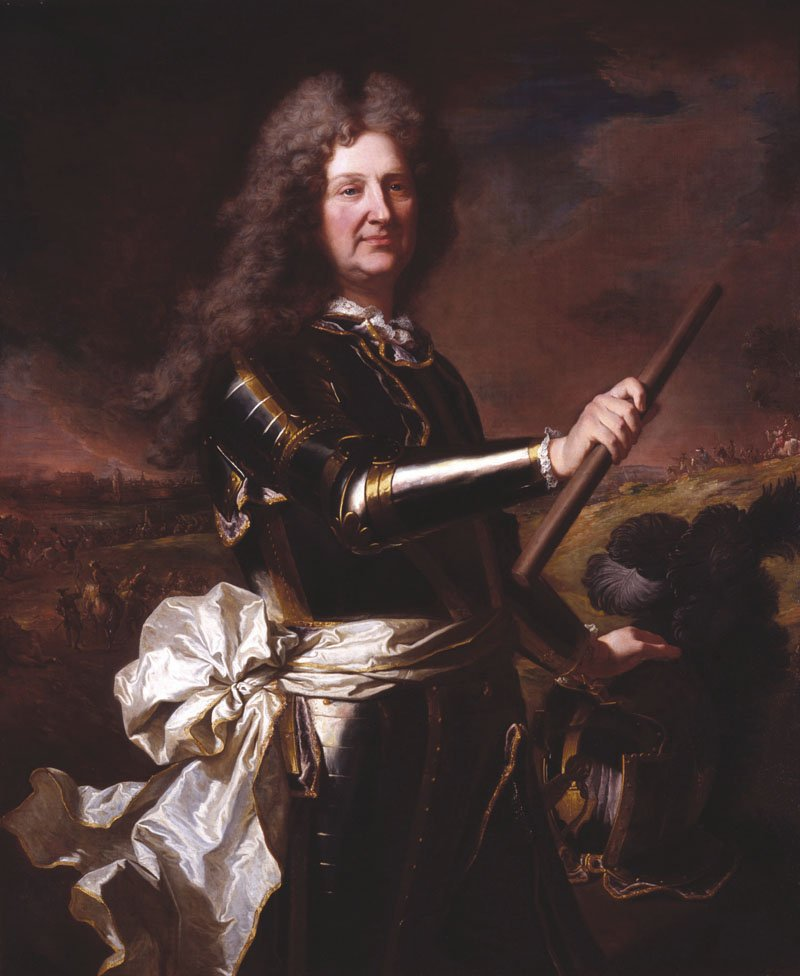
Presumed portrait by Hyacinthe Rigaud, c. 1699

Robert Jean Antoine de Franquetot de Coigny (1652 – August 10, 1704) was a French soldier.

He was the son of Jean Antoine de Franquetot, Comte de Franquetot, who died on July 2, 1652, at the battle of the Faubourg Saint Antoine.

His estate at Coigny was raised to a comté by King Louis XIV as a mark of his father's service. The Comte de Coigny entered the Musketeers in 1667. He was appointed Governor of Caen in 1680. He became Lieutenant-General of Louis XIV's armies in 1693, and Director-General of Cavalry in 1694. He died at Kœnigsmacker, Alsace, in August 1704.

He was buried in the church of Coigny.

Robert Jean Antoine had married Marie-Françoise de Matignon (August 3, 1648 – October 11, 1719) on October 5, 1668. They had 3 children: François, Henri and Madeleine. He was succeeded as Comte de Coigny by his son François de Franquetot de Coigny (1670–1759) who became Marshal of France.
