= Siege of Fribourg (1744) =

- Part of War of the Austrian Succession
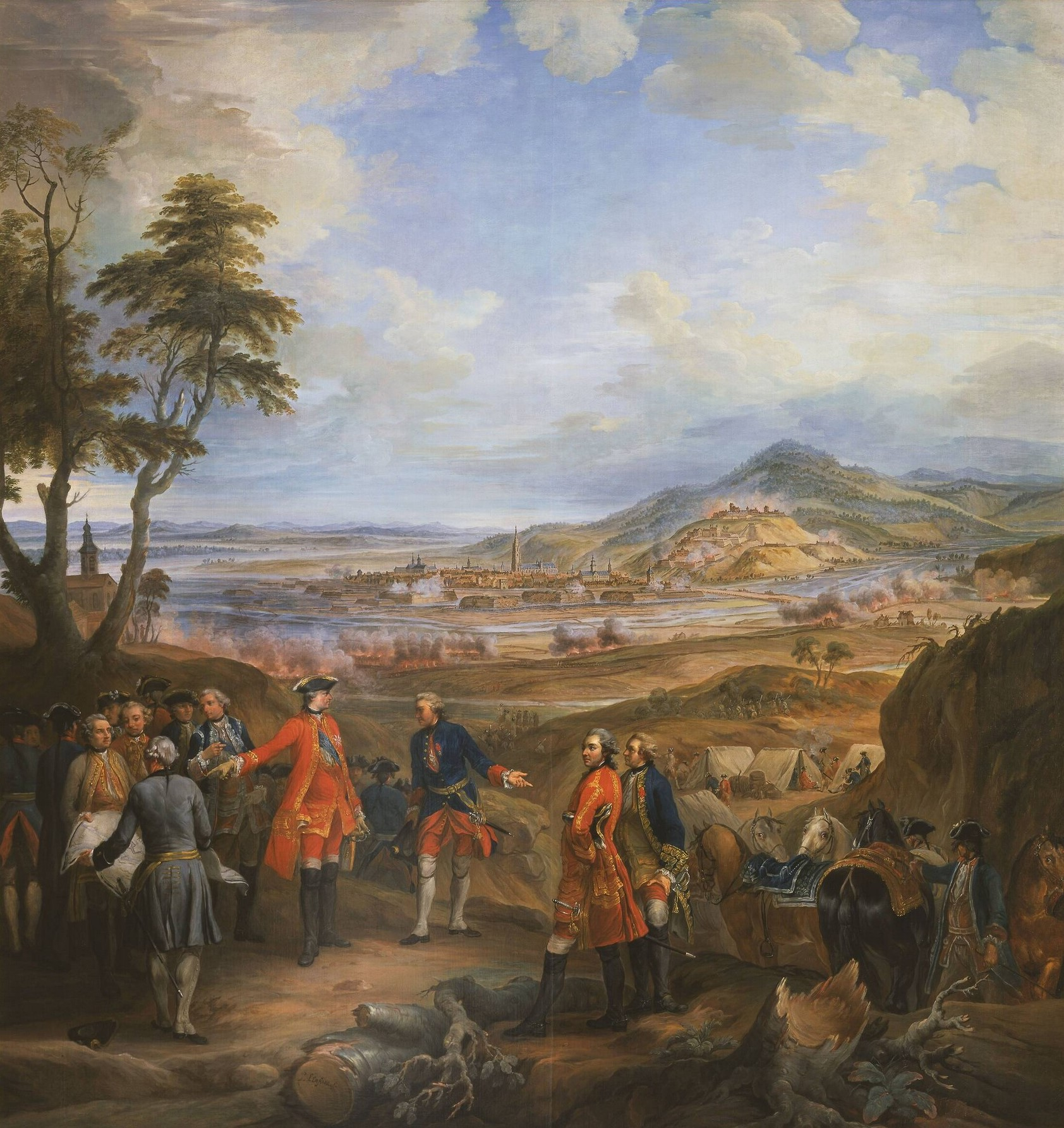
- Siege of Fribourg, 11 October 1744 by Pierre Lenfant, 1759-1767, depicting Louis XV's arrival at the siege
Date	19 September – 25 November 1744
Location	Freiburg im Breisgau 47.9955°N 07.8522°E
Result	French victory

Belligerents
France	(Holy Roman Empire) Habsburg monarchy

Commanders and leaders
François de Franquetot de Coigny	Wolf Siegmund von Damnitz

Strength
70,000 men	around 7,000 men

Casualties and losses
around 10,000 dead	4,570 prisoners, 601 dead, 1,455 sick and wounded, 729 deserters

The Siege of Fribourg took place between September and November 1744 during the War of the Austrian Succession.

After Charles VI's death several members of his family competed to be his heir. Bavaria and Spain formed an alliance in 1741 through the Treaty of Nymphenburg, which Prussia, Saxony, France, Sweden, Naples, the Palatinate and the Electorate of Cologne joined later. Great Britain and the Dutch Republic, France's traditional enemies, allied with Austria against them.

== Austrian preparations ==
When the Austrian commander-in-chief Prince Charles Alexander of Lorraine was transferred from the Rhine to Bohemia following Prussia's declaration of war, he was aware of the threat from France and wished to leave the fortress at Fribourg with a large enough garrison. He hoped he could defend it with 7000 men. The necessary reinforcements were sent under major general von Hagenbach's command. After the reinforcements arrived, the garrison totalled 6044 infantrymen, 370 cavalrymen and 199 artillerymen. 842 sick soldiers were also still inside the fortress, which was put under the command of marshal-lieutenant Wolf Siegmund von Damnitz.

== Austrian order of battle ==
- 18th regiment of imperial infantry
- 24th regiment of imperial infantry
- 36th regiment of imperial infantry
- 40th regiment of imperial infantry
- 41st regiment of imperial infantry
- 47th regiment of imperial infantry
- 955 men from the 'corps franc' of Theiss, 50 hussars and 70 dragoons under the command of lieutenant-colonel Franz de Galhau

== State of the fortress ==
From a military point of view, much had been done to the fortress since its previous siege in 1713. It was surrounded by 8 bastions with ravelins and counter-guards, and six advance lunettes in front of the main defences. The lower castle (commanded by colonel Sturm) and the upper castle (commanded by colonel von Arnswaldt) formed citadels, but were overlooked by several mountains. They were about 300 metres apart and that space was filled by a hexagon called das Salzbůchsel. In front of it ran the Dreisam and a small redoubt. On the reverse slope of the mountain, in front of the upper castle, was a hornwork linked to the redoubt by a covered way. The designers planned for the two castles and the defence works to be defended by 1451 infantrymen, which left only 4593 infantrymen for the fortress proper, an insufficient number given the extent and nature of the defence works. The garrison was divided into three groups:

- the guards and the defence works
- supporting the first group and supplying it with workers and pikemen
- those resting

Even if the planned defence of the fortress needed reinforcements, the reality was different - the defence works alone were in very bad repair, some even in ruin, and several necessary palisades were missing. Engineer-colonel Sully started repairing the outer works, but he had little time to do it in.

== French attack ==
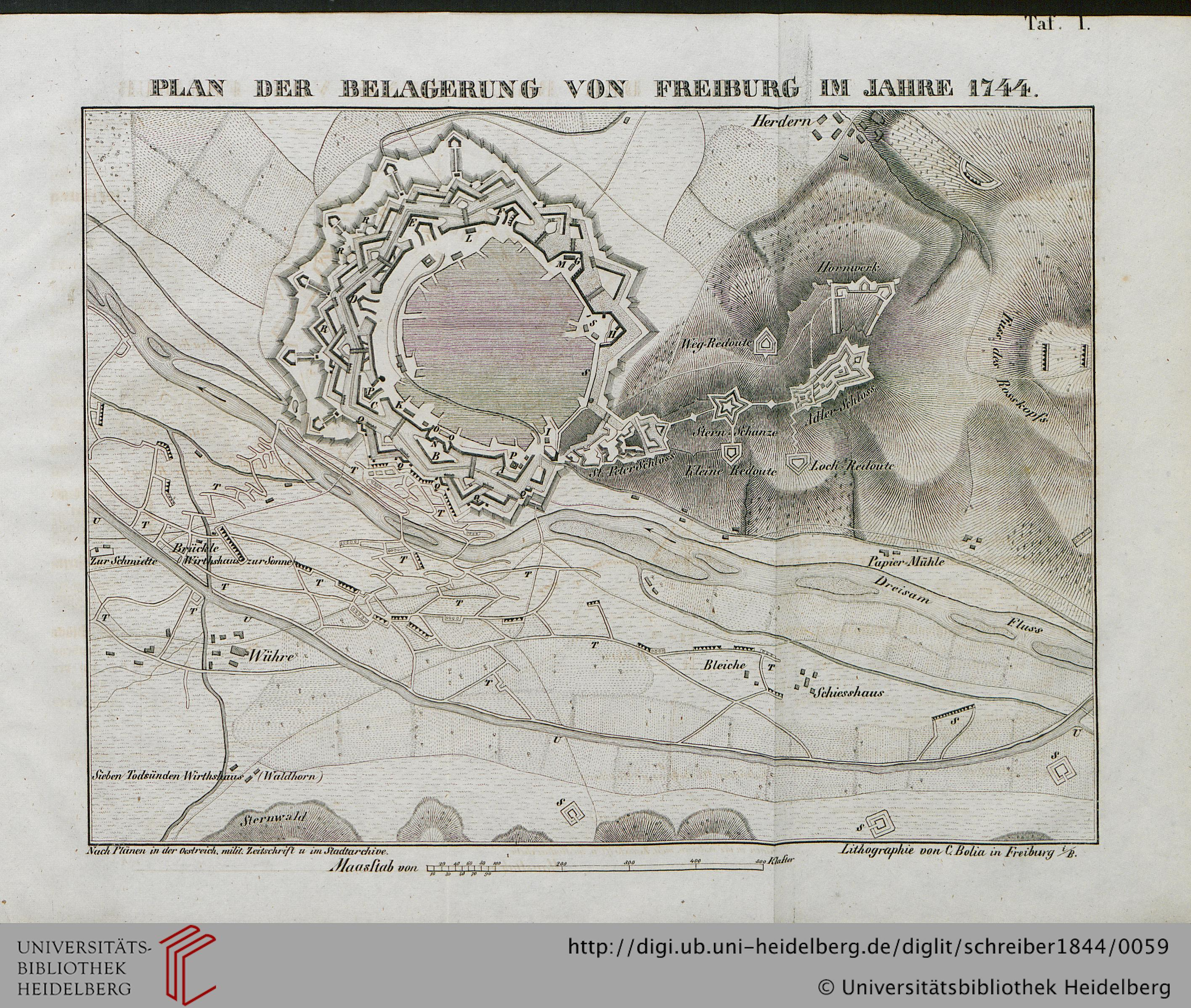
Plan of the siege

On 28 and 29 August the French army crossed the Rhine with around 70,000 men at Fort-Louis, with maréchal Coigny as commander in chief, and the siege of Fribourg became a certainty. On 17 September the French advance guard was sighted, the whole army the following day and by 19 September the fortress was encircled. Contrary to what the Austrians expected, the French decided to send their main attack against the imperial bastion, which was not covered by any defence works. Unlike 1713, the advantage was that this plan did not also need a supporting attack against the castles, but it did require crossing the Dreisnam, liable to sudden flooding. The French therefore decided to divert the river, which was feasible but required much work.

On 20 September the French diverted the water running the fortress's water mills, forcing it to resort to horse-powered mills. On 21 September the French attacked the volunteers posted outside, but they held firm. On the night of 22-23 September the French opened their watercourses, behind which other workers were occupied in digging a new riverbed for the Dreisnam.

The garrison made a sortie on 24 September, but it was a small force and unsuccessful. During the night of 27-28 September the breach was made and most of the waters of the Dreisnam flowed into the new course, though this did allow the fortress's watermills to start once again. The garrison then learned that 107 cannon and 60 mortars had arrived at Coigny's headquarters at Sankt Georgen. On the night of 29 September the second parallel was opened.

== October ==
On the night of 1 October the besiegers worked on several gun batteries, but these were largely destroyed by violent well-targeted fire from the fortress's artillery. Inside the fortress the commander knew his force would be aimed at one of the three bastions - named Pieter, Kaiser and Kaiserin - but did not know which and so had to put in countermeasures at all three.

On the morning of 8 October he did not know if the French had completed and armed their gun batteries. At midday a bomb blew up a powder magazine in the ditches and the besiegers immediately opened fire with all guns. At 1 pm ten batteries, sixty heavy cannon and several mortars began bombarding the castles and town. Several houses and barrack blocks were set on fire and - as the inhabitants could not be persuaded to put out the fires - the garrison suffered seven dead and 36 wounded between then and the following morning.

On 9 October the bombardment continued to burn down several houses, destroyed most of the communication bridges to the defence works and several palisades, and prevented any attempts to repair them. On 10 October four new batteries were ready, the lower castle was violently bombarded, and the Austrian cavalry posts forced to leave their posts dispersed around the town and retire. That day the French also built another new battery. In the three bastions almost all the artillery pieces had been put out of action, the bridges destroyed and workers and wood had both run out.

Louis XV was sick at Metz, but on 12 October the garrison learned through prisoners that he had arrived before Fribourg the previous day with a large force of Swiss troops and encamped at Schloss Munzingen. The same day the besiegers crossed the Dreisnam and set up a bridgehead on the right bank. A bomb fell in the upper castle, setting fire to the wooden bastion in front of the powder magazine, burning down the iron and wood gates behind it and setting light to a barrel of powder. This was only put out thanks to the bravery and presence of mind of an engineer captain named de la Motte, saving the upper castle and countless lives.

Until 19 October there were no other major events other than heavy fire both by and on the besiegers. On the evening of 19 October, at 11 pm, two hundred French troops assaulted the first flèche. The defenders' musket fire dispersed them and a second attack by four hundred men also failed. At midnight the French made a general assault against the covered way into the Kaiser bastion - a mine was blown too soon by the besiegers but a second one had a greater effect. The French searched in vain to hold the covered way as the fire from the musket slits and ravines was too violent, though they did manage to occupy the crest of the glacis and put gap batteries on it. This assault cost them 700 dead and many wounded, whereas the garrison suffered twenty deaths and 56 wounded.

The two French mines cut during the assault left the garrison only one mine, against which the besiegers prepared a counter-mine. They therefore had to blow it up at 10, burying the French miners and wounding several workers with flying stones. On the night of 21 October a fresh assault captured the covered way at the cost of 800 men, including prince Elboeuf, among the besiegers, compared to the garrison's losses of one officer and 22 men dead, 6 officers and 44 men wounded, and 1 officer and 18 men captured.

== November ==
The siege continued. Between 2 and 3 am on 3 November the French took ravelins 1 and 2 and the two sides of the Kaiser bastion on the attack front. The Austrian Harracher grenadiers' bravery pushed the French off the bastion twice. General Friedrich Eberhard von Hagen-Motten († 1757) was wounded. When the day came the fire from the nearest defence works forced the besiegers to abandon everything they had captured. The Austrians did not reoccupy the heavily depleted garrison, whilst the French retrenched and set up new batteries.

=== Surrender ===
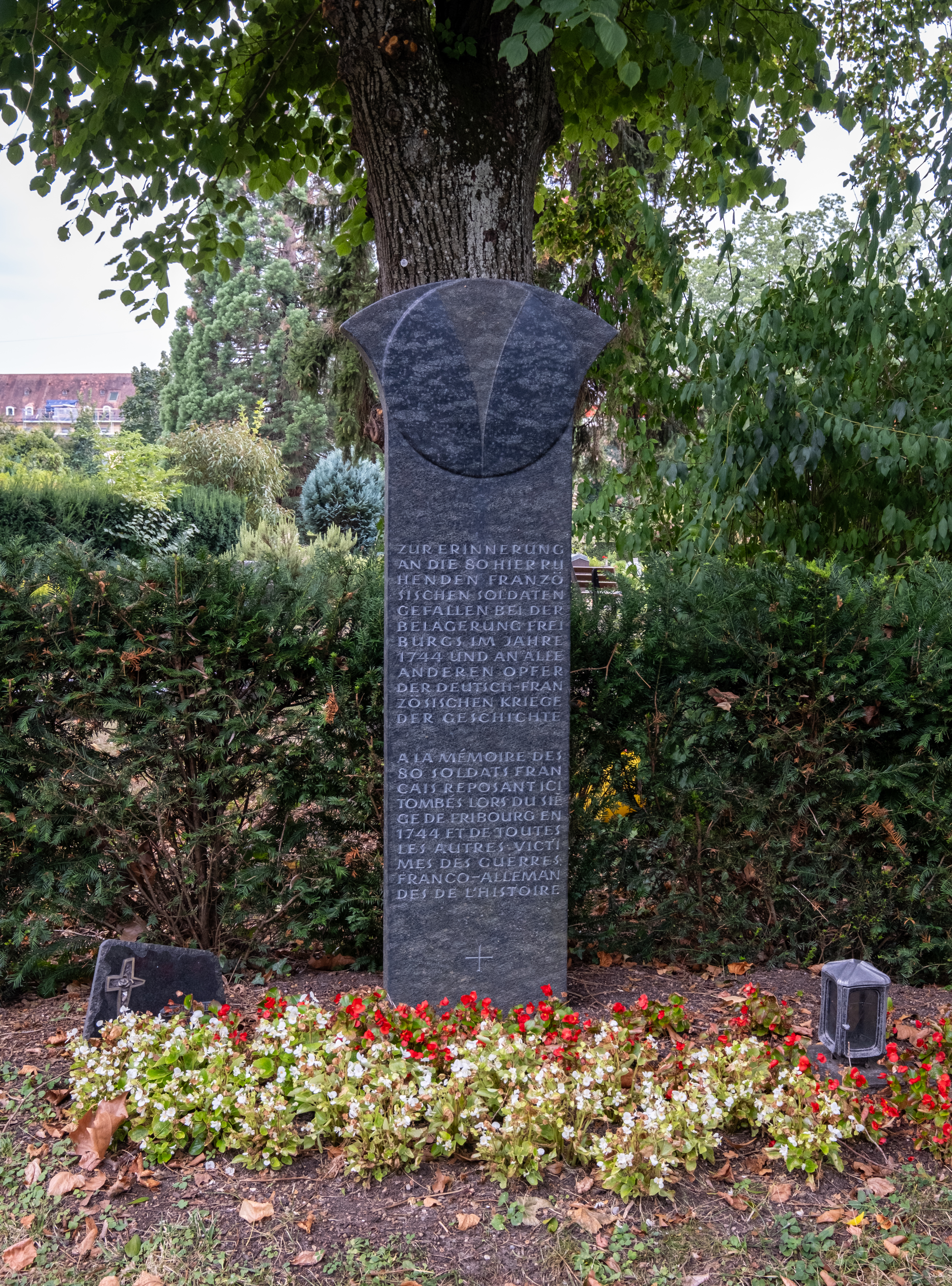
Memorial to the French fallen at the town's main cemetery.

On 5 November field marshal Damnitz called a council of war, which came to a unanimous decision to surrender in order to save the sick and wounded so long as the garrison could march out in arms.

Major baron Materna was sent to make this offer to Louis personally, but the king declined to speak to anyone but the garrison commander. General Damntiz and colonel Häussler then went to meet Louis, who refused to let the garrison go unless the town and its castles were handed over. Damnitz replied that the castles' commanders were independent of his and so he would have to await direct orders from the queen of Hungary Maria-Theresa of Austria.

Louis granted a fifteen day delay and marshal Coigny sent a surrender plan which the council debated. As the town's garrison would not fit in the castles, they decided to hand over the town and castles in return for a free departure. Colonel Heister or Heisser and captain Diversy took this message to Louis, who agreed to it so long as his forces could immediately occupy the Fisherman's Gate. Relying on Louis's word, Damnitz let this happen without concluding a formal surrender, but as soon as the French took possession of the gate a free departure was no longer an option.

Instead the garrison had to immediately move into the castles, where negotiations would then continue. The Austrians speedily evacuated the town, in which the French placed a strong garrison of their own under lieutenant general Balincourt. They put several proposals to the Austrians, but the promise of a free departure was forgotten. On 9 November major Materna went to Vienna to report on the situation, returning on 24 with orders to retake the castles. By then the French had dug trenches in the mountains overlooking the castles and could fire on them at will.

On 25 November Damnitz and marshal Coigny signed an act of surrender, after which the garrison marched out on 28-30 November with all the honours of war, only to be made prisoners of war, though the officers were allowed to keep their swords in captivity and all individuals in the garrison had to be replaced as quickly as possible.

The force which marched out was around 4570 men. 511 had been killed or died of their wounds, 190 had died of sickness, 1455 were sick and wounded and 729 men had deserted. The garrison had fired 100,313 cannon shot, 1,656,115 musket shots and 13,979 bombs. 87 cannon and 3 mortars had been put out of action by the besiegers. 195 usable shells were left (mostly metal), along with 40 stone cannon balls, 55 metal mortars, 6390 quintals of powder, 8354 quintals of flour, 3580 quintals of bread and 79,230 portions of biscuit. No record survives of the total French losses during the siege, but they are estimated at around 10,000 men.

Louis realised he would not be able to hold on to this town during peacetime and immediately started blowing up its defence works, a process which lasted until the French departed. Fribourg also lost its status as a fortress town.

== Bibliography (in German) ==
- Oestreich milit Zeitschrift Jahrgang 1826 Heft XII
- Hans Eggert Willibald von der Lühe, Militair-Conversations-Lexikon, Band 3,
- Schau-ins-Land: Jahresheft des Breisgau-Geschichtsvereins Schauinsland, 1906, S. 100ff
- Die Belagerung von Freiburg. Ein Tagebuch, niedergeschrieben von einem Augenzeugen im Jahr 1744, nebst der Belagerung vom Jahr 1713 und einem Plan der ehemaligen Festung Freiburg,
- Gaston Bodart, Militär-historisches Kriegs-Lexikon (1618–1905),
- Jaromir Hirtenfeld, Oesterreichisches Militär-Konversations-Lexikon, Band 2, S. 534ff
