= Prétot-Sainte-Suzanne =

Former commune in Normandy, France

- Part of Montsenelle
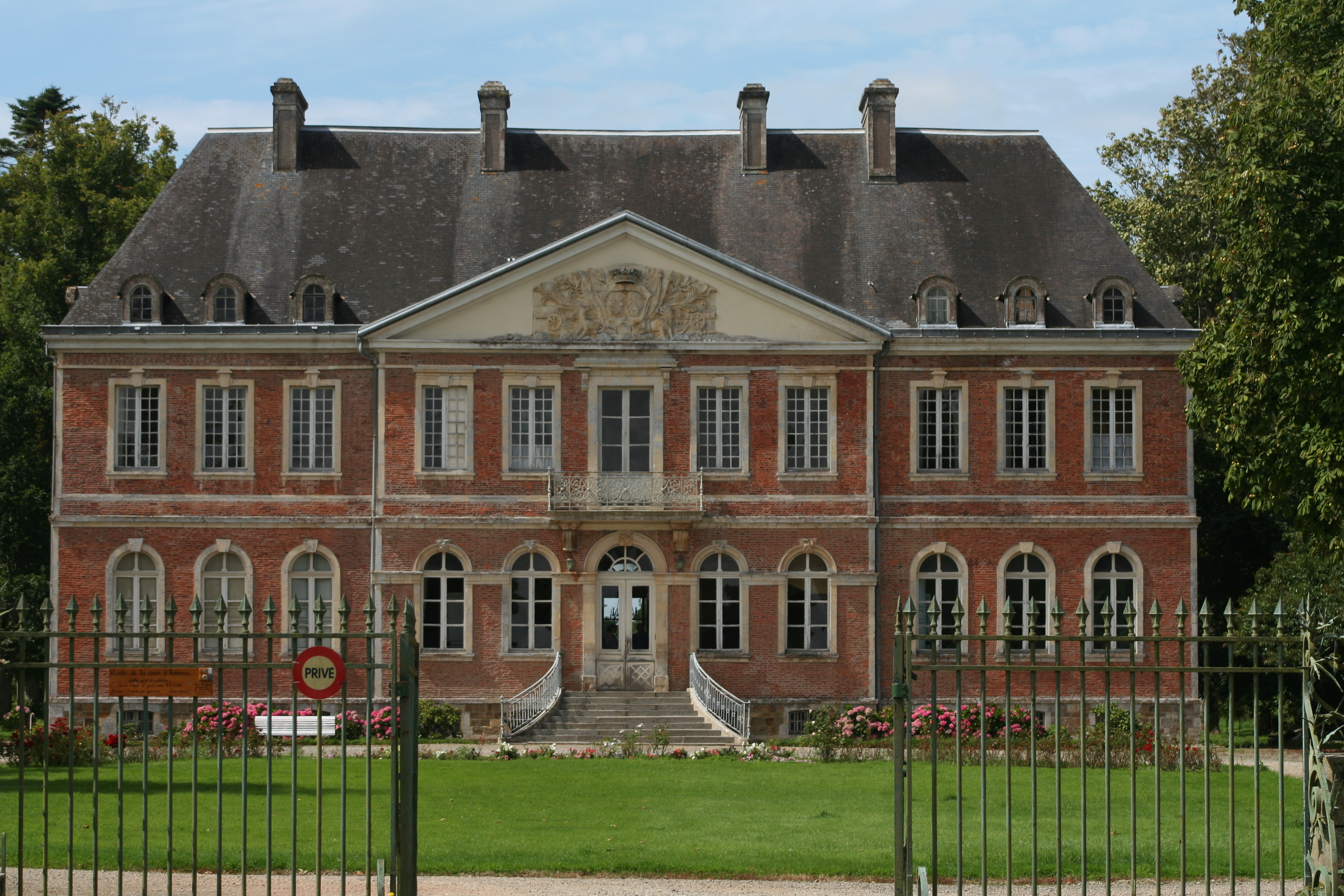
- The chateau of Sainte-Suzanne
- Location of Prétot-Sainte-Suzanne
- Location within France Location within Normandy
- Coordinates: 49°19′32″N 1°26′09″W
- Country: France
- Region: Normandy
- Department: Manche
- Arrondissement: Coutances
- Canton: Créances
- Commune: Montsenelle
- Area^{1}: 11.64 km^{2} (4.49 sq mi)
- Elevation: 36 m (118 ft)
- Highest elevation: 44 m (144 ft)
- Lowest elevation: 4 m (13 ft)
- Population (2022): 296
  - Density: 25.4/km^{2} (65.9/sq mi)
- Time zone: UTC+01:00 (CET)
  - Summer (DST): UTC+02:00 (CEST)
- Postal code: 50250
- ^{1} French Land Register data, which excludes lakes, ponds, glaciers > 1 km^{2} (0.386 sq mi or 247 acres) and river estuaries.

Prétot-Sainte-Suzanne (French pronunciation: [pʁeto sɛ̃t syzan]) is a former commune in the Manche department in Normandy in north-western France.On 1 January 2016, it was merged into the new commune of Montsenelle.

== See also ==
- Communes of the Manche department
