= Kühkopf-Knoblochsaue =

Nature reserve in Hesse

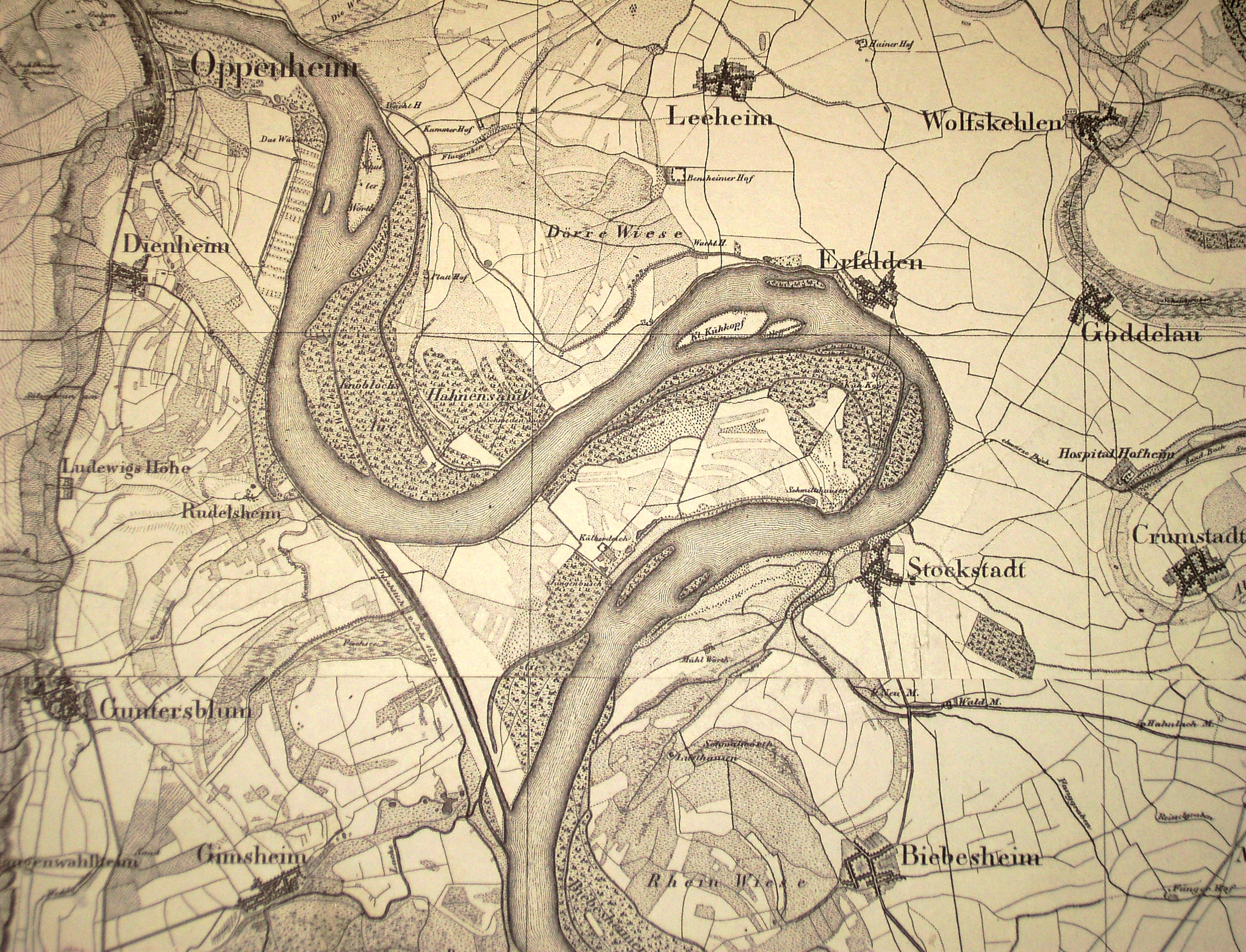
- Historic map of 1829, showing the Rhine meandering before the shortcut, with the Kühkopf enclosed by the central meander, and Knoblochsaue enclosed by the northern meander
- Interactive map of Kühkopf-Knoblochsaue
- Location: Groß-Gerau district, Hesse, Germany
- Coordinates: 49°49′N 8°25′E
- Website: Official website

Kühkopf-Knoblochsaue is a Naturschutzgebiet (nature reserve) of European standard, located in the Groß-Gerau district, Germany. It is the largest nature reserve in Hesse, part of the Hessian Ried between the river Rhine and the Hessische Bergstraße. It is also the largest continuous Überschwemmungsgebiet along the Hessian part of the Rhine, providing flood control.

== History ==
The Rhine flowed in a large meander (Schleife or Schlinge) enclosing the Kühkopf. Until the beginning of the 17th century, the Kühkopf was a hunting area for noble families, also for farming from single estates (Hofgüter). On 7 December 1631, Gustavus Adolphus of Sweden and his army crossed the Rhine during the Thirty Years' War, memorialized by the Schwedensäule monument in the Knoblochsaue.

In 1828/29, directed by Großherzoglicher Darmstädter Wasserbaudirektor Claus Kröncke, a shortcut of the river (Rhein-Durchstich) shortened the passage for ships. The Kühkopf became an island with the new Rhine in the west and the former river bed (Altrhein). The former island Knoblochsaue became a peninsula.

The ecology of the area is of great importance, and has been protected from 20 March 1952. It is now a Europareservat, protected since 2008 by the Habitats Directive of the European Union.

== Nature and landscape ==
The protected area contains riparian forests (Auwald or Aue), both Weichholzaue with typical Kopfweide and black poplar, and bottomland hardwood forests with oak, elm and aspen.

The Kühkopf area has a long tradition of orchards. In 1960, 3531 apple trees, 61 pear trees, 130 plum trees, 36 walnut trees and five mirabelle plum trees were counted, planted as Streuobst (orchard). The protected area has more than 2000 fruit trees, including more than 30 kinds of apples.

The extended swamps of the floodplains, with grass, reed beds and trees, offer breeding places for many kinds of birds, and resting places for migrating birds. The symbol of the Kühkopf is the black kite. Deer, wild boars, foxes, frogs and toads are common in the protected area. In spring, much of the forest floor is covered by wild garlic. Many trees host mistletoes.

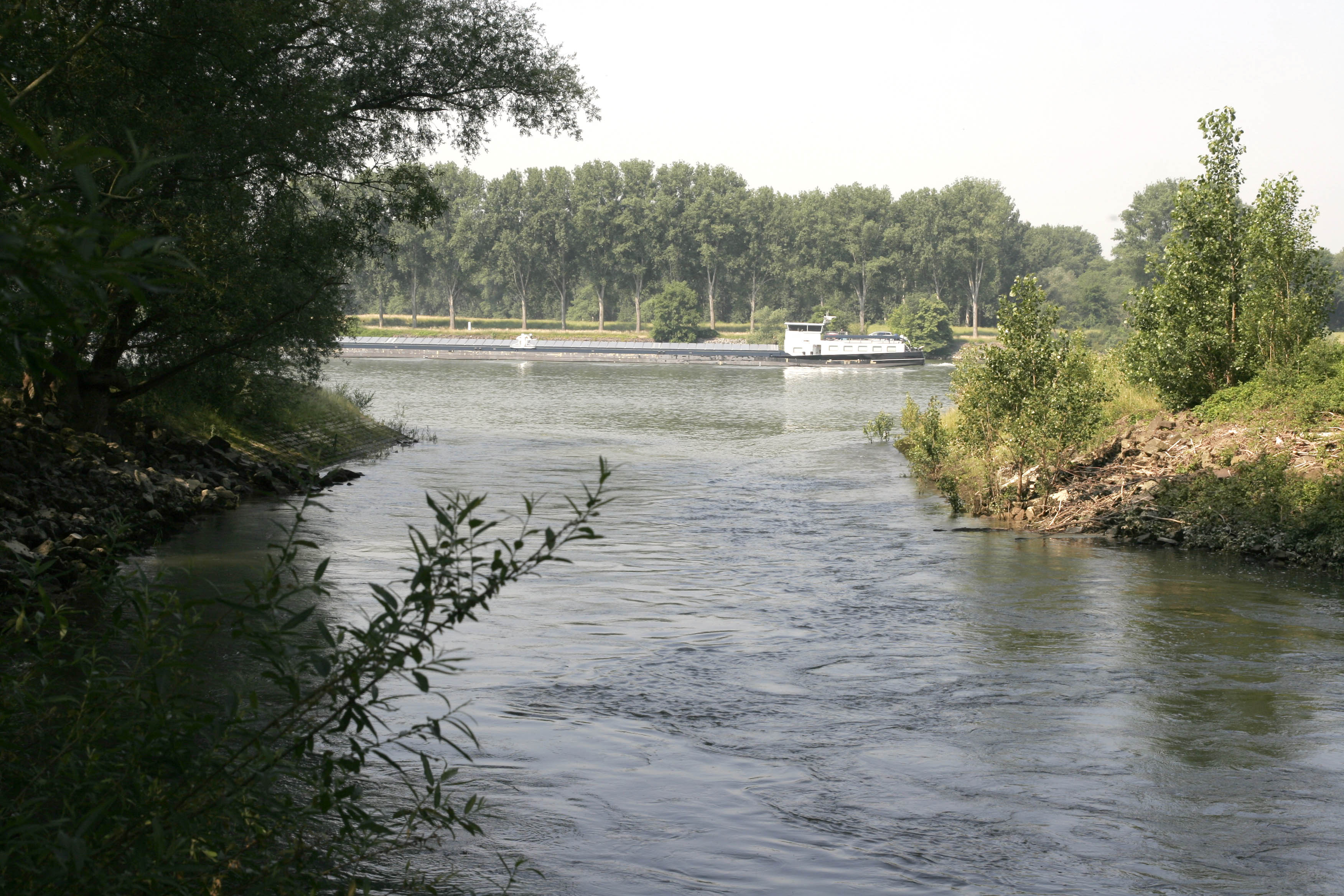
Altrhein separating from the Rhine

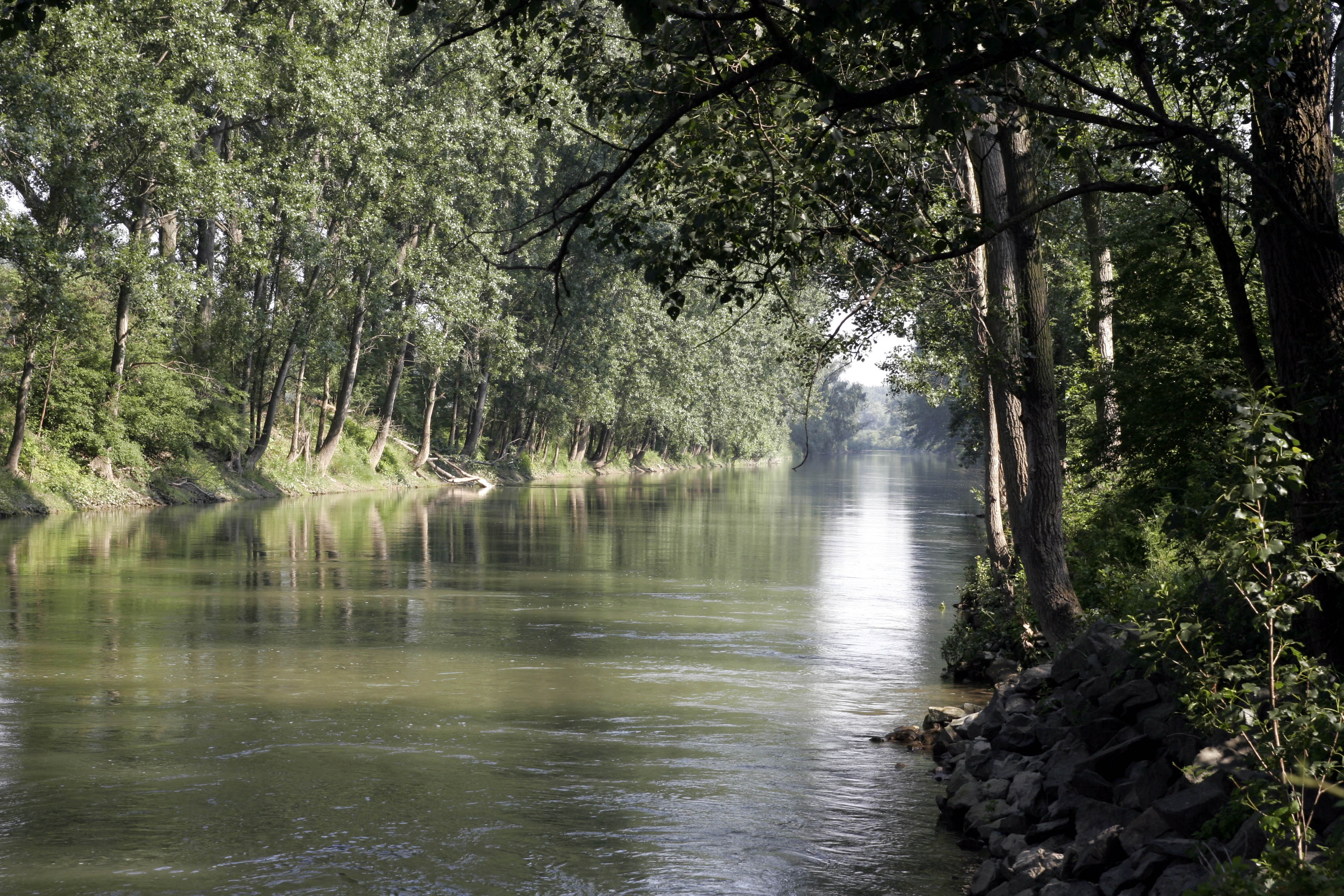
Altrhein, Kühkopf to the left

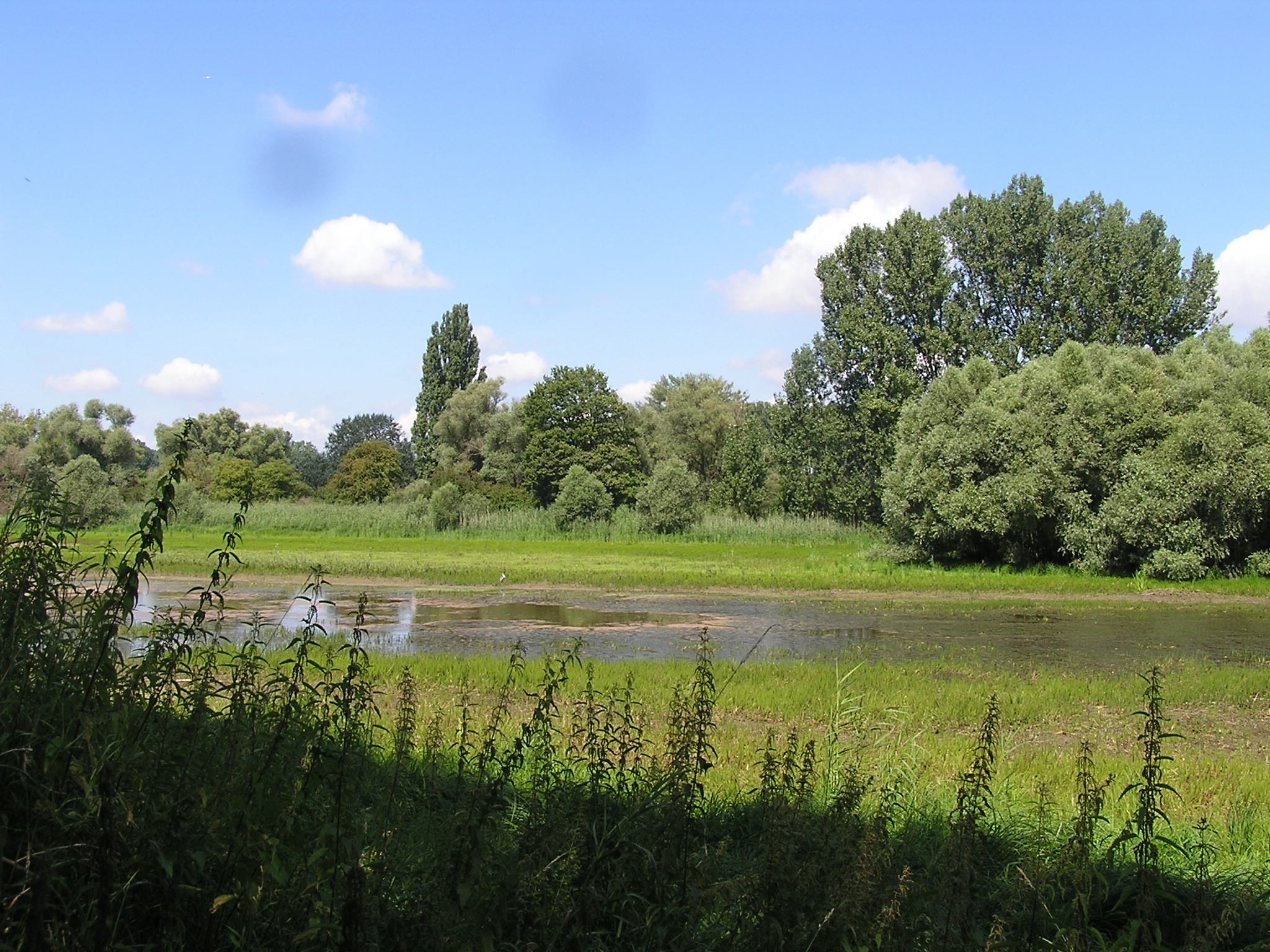
Altrhein

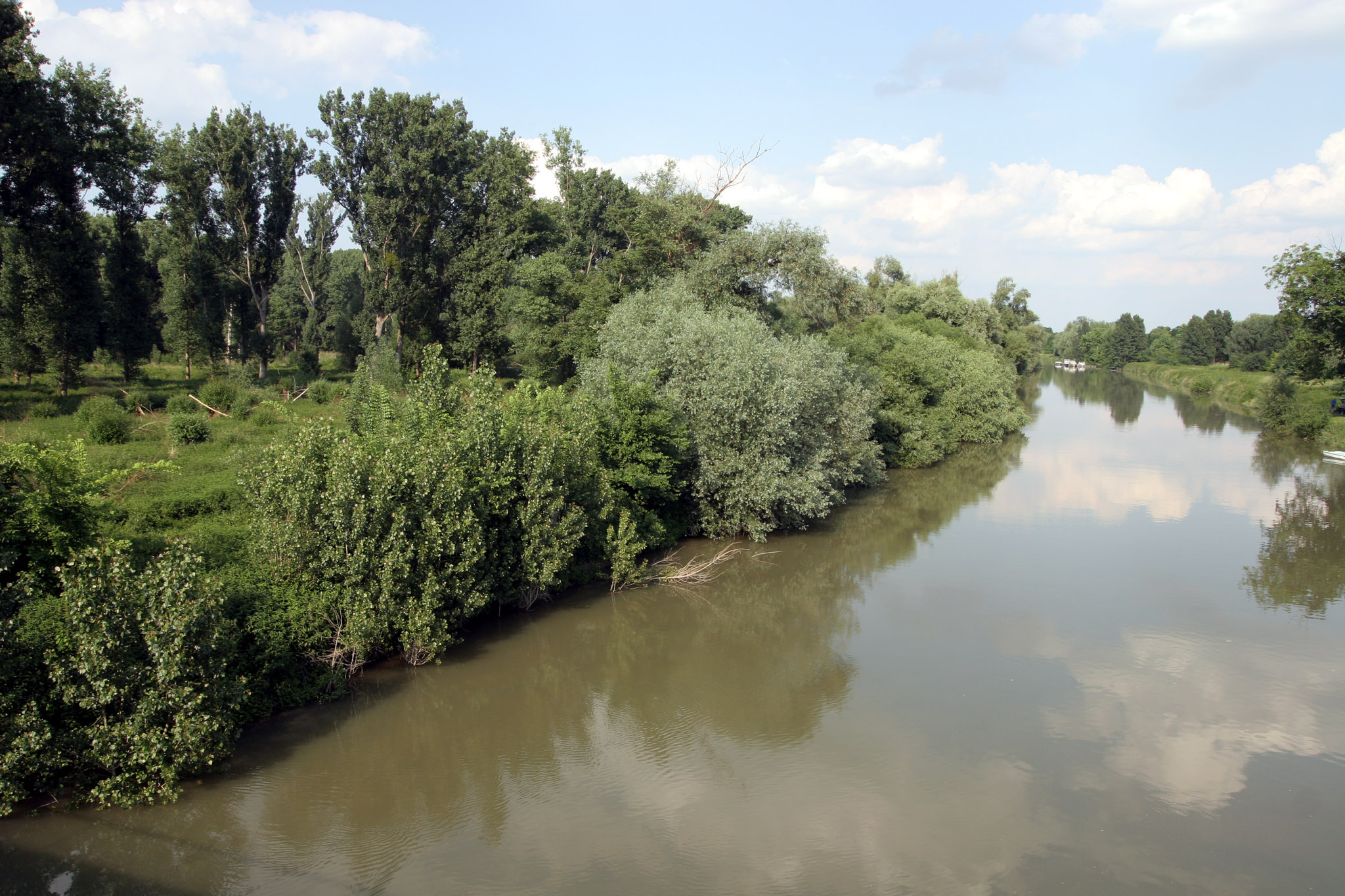
Altrhein near Stockstadt, Kühkopf to the left

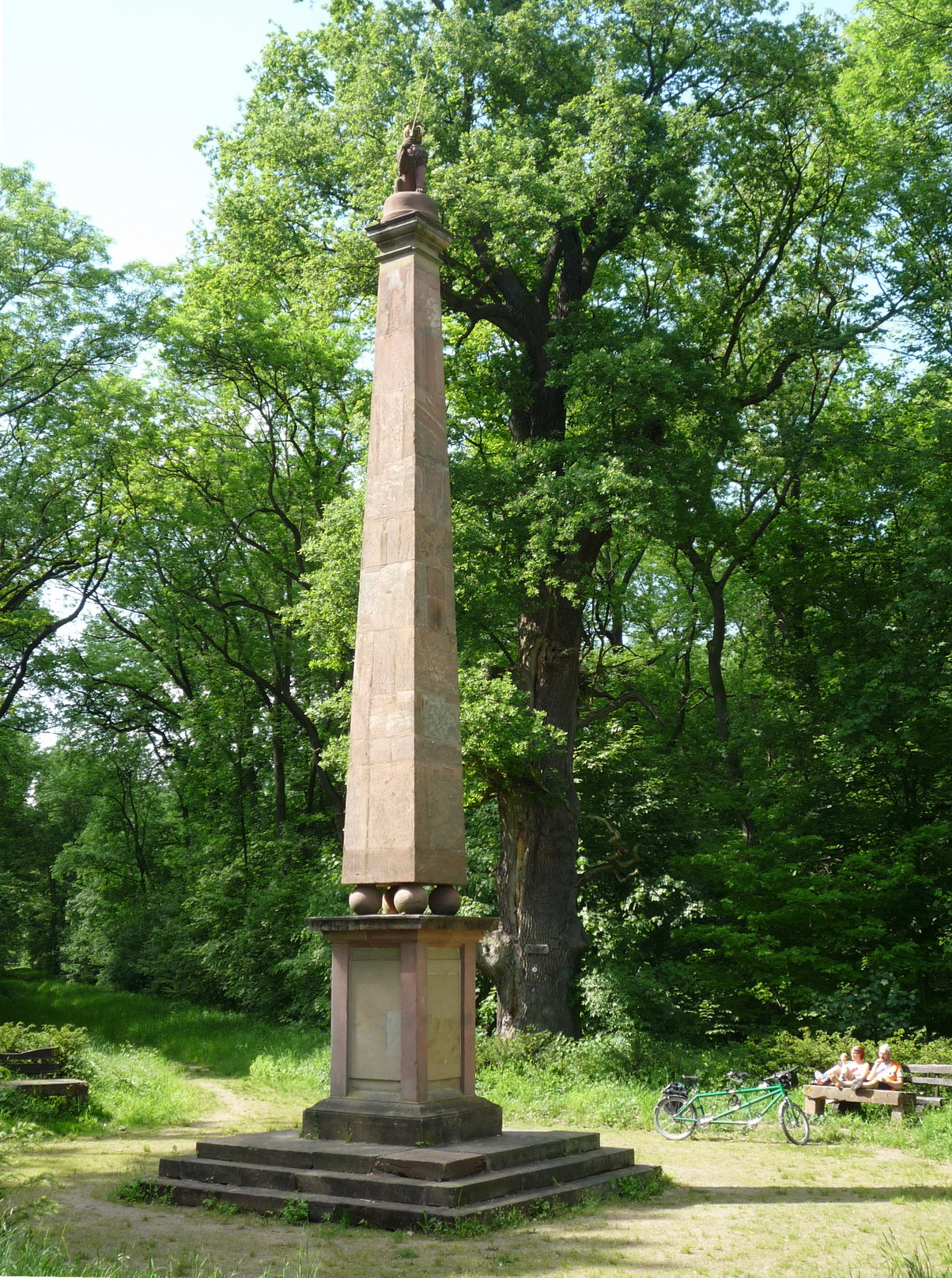
Schwedensäule

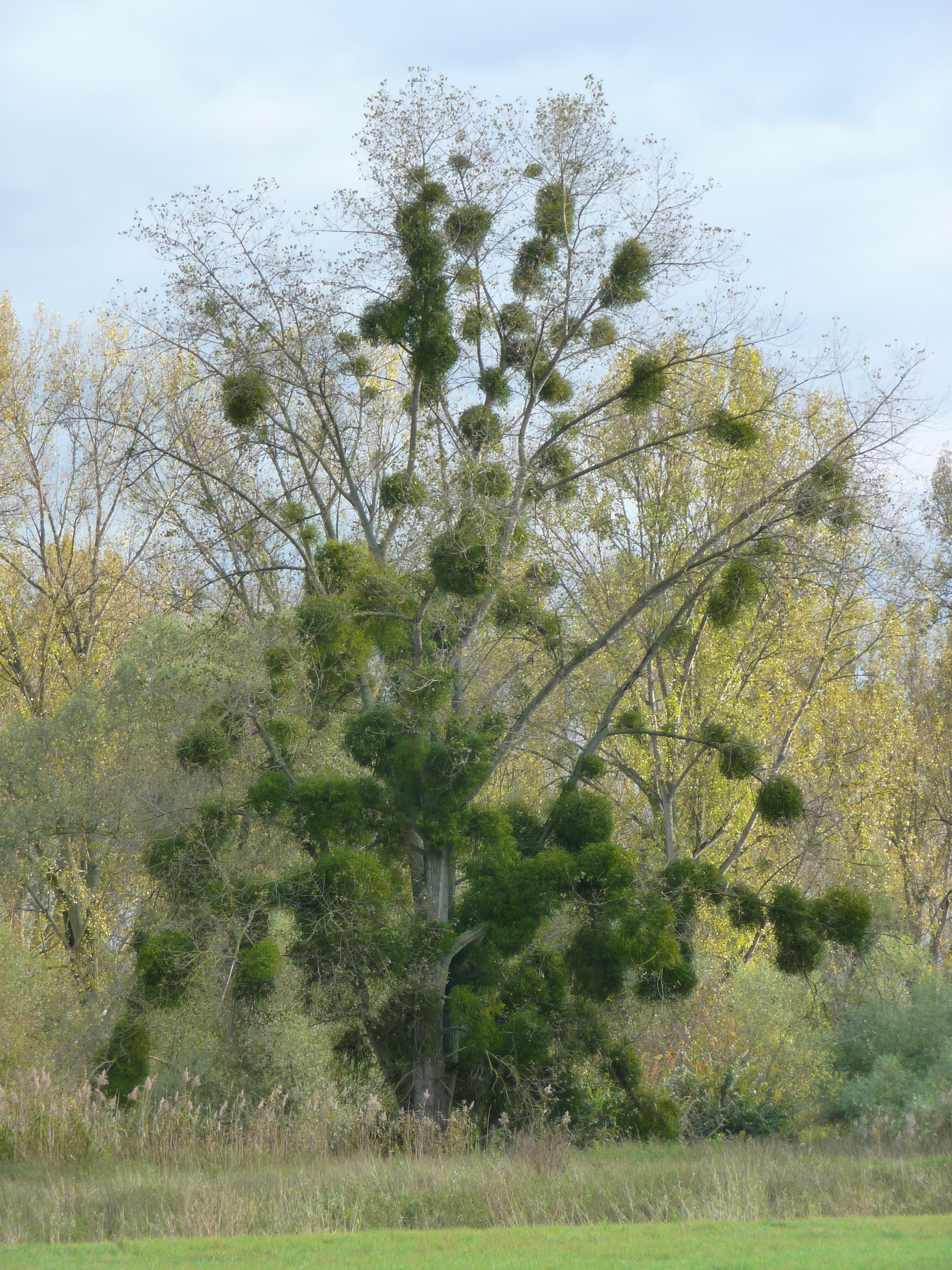
Mistletoe growing on poplar

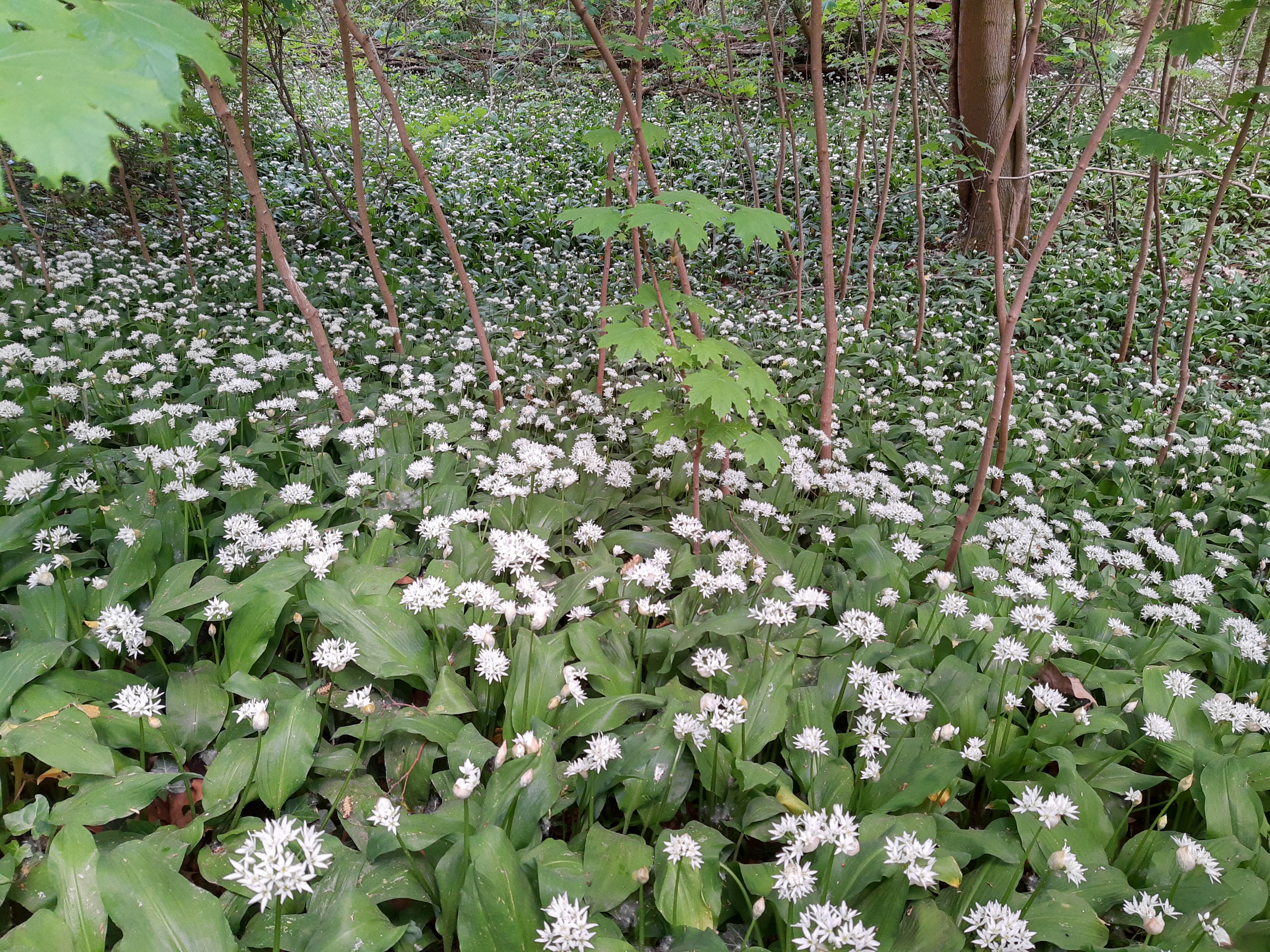
Wild garlic
