= Hugh Dalrymple-Murray-Kynynmound =

Scottish landowner, lawyer, and journalist (1695–1741)

Hugh Dalrymple-Murray-Kynnynmond (né Hugh Dalrymple) (1695 – 23 December 1741), was a Scottish landowner, lawyer and journalist.

== Early life ==
He was a younger son of Sir David Dalrymple, 1st Baronet and Janet (née Rochead) Murray Dalrymple. At the time of his parents' marriage, his mother was the widow of Alexander Murray of Melgund (eldest son of Sir Robert Murray, Lord Provost of Edinburgh, and brother to Robert Murray). From his mother's first marriage, he had an elder half-brother, Sir Alexander Murray, 1st Baronet. Among his siblings of his parents marriage were Andrew Dalrymple (who immigrated to the Massachusetts Bay Colony giving up his right to the family title), Sir James Dalrymple, 2nd Baronet (who married Lady Christian Hamilton, daughter of Thomas Hamilton, 6th Earl of Haddington), and Janet Dalrymple (who married Sir John Baird, 2nd Baronet and, after his death, Gen. James St Clair).

His father was the fifth and youngest son of James Dalrymple, 1st Viscount of Stair and Margaret Ross (daughter of James Ross of Balneil, Wigtown). His paternal uncles were John Dalrymple, 1st Earl of Stair, Sir James Dalrymple, 1st Baronet, Sir Hew Dalrymple, and Thomas Dalrymple (who became physician to Queen Anne). His maternal grandfather was Sir James Rochead, 1st Baronet of Inverleith and his aunt, Mary Rochead, was the wife of Sir Francis Kinloch, 3rd Baronet.

== Career ==
In 1709, his father became Lord Advocate of Scotland and purchased Whitehills House as a family seat, renaming it Newhailes after the Dalrymple's Hailes Castle. Hugh became an advocate, and journalist and lived at Kynynmound in Fife.

Upon the death of his nephew, Sir Alexander Murray, 2nd Baronet, in March 1736, the Murray baronetcy passed to Sir Joseph Murray, 3rd Baronet (the son of Robert Murray), while the estate, including Melgund Castle, passed to him. In recognition, he assumed these names on succeeding to the estates of the Murrays of Melgund in Forfarshire, and Kynnynmond in Fife.

== Personal life ==
Hugh married Isobel Sommerville (b. c. 1699–1760), the daughter of Hugh Sommerville of Invertiel (later absorbed in to Kirkcaldy). Together, they were the parents of:

- Agnes Dalrymple-Murray-Kynynmound (1734–1778), who married Sir Gilbert Elliot, 3rd Baronet, of Minto, in 1747.

Dalrymple-Murray-Kynnynmond died on 23 December 1741. Melgund Castle was inherited by his daughter and passing by marriage to his grandson, the 1st Earl of Minto, who was granted the title Viscount Melgund, presently used by the heir to the earldom. It remained in the family until it was sold in 1990.

=== Descendants ===
Dalrymple-Murray-Kynnynmond was posthumously a grandfather to eight, including Gilbert Elliot-Murray-Kynynmound, 1st Earl of Minto, Hugh Elliot, Alexander Kynymound Elliot, Robert Elliot, and Eleanor Elliot (wife of William Eden, 1st Baron Auckland).
