= Sir James Dalrymple, 2nd Baronet =

Scottish Member of Parliament (1692–1751)

The Right Honourable Sir James Dalrymple Bt

Member of Parliament for Haddington Burghs
- In office 1722–1734
- Preceded by: Sir David Dalrymple, Bt
- Succeeded by: James Fall

Personal details
- Born: 24 July 1692
- Died: 24 February 1751 (aged 58)
- Spouse: Lady Christian Hamilton (m. 1725)
- Relations: Hugh Dalrymple-Murray-Kynynmound (brother)
- Children: 15
- Parent: Sir David Dalrymple, 1st Baronet
- Education: Queen's College, Oxford

Sir James Dalrymple, 2nd Baronet (24 July 1692 – 24 February 1751) was Member of Parliament for Haddington Burghs and the Principal Auditor of the Exchequer in Scotland.

== Early life ==
He was the son of Sir David Dalrymple, 1st Baronet and Janet (née Rochead) Murray Dalrymple. At the time of his parents' marriage, his mother was the widow of Alexander Murray of Melgund (eldest son of Sir Robert Murray, Lord Provost of Edinburgh, and brother to Robert Murray). From his mother's first marriage, he had an elder half-brother, Sir Alexander Murray, 1st Baronet. Among his siblings of his parents marriage were Andrew Dalrymple (who immigrated to the Massachusetts Bay Colony giving up his right to the family title), Hugh Dalrymple-Murray-Kynynmound, and Janet Dalrymple (who married Sir John Baird, 2nd Baronet and, after his death, Gen. James St Clair).

His father was the fifth and youngest son of James Dalrymple, 1st Viscount of Stair and Margaret Ross (daughter of James Ross of Balneil, Wigtown). His paternal uncles were John Dalrymple, 1st Earl of Stair, Sir James Dalrymple, 1st Baronet, Sir Hew Dalrymple, and Thomas Dalrymple (who became physician to Queen Anne). His maternal grandfather was Sir James Rochead, 1st Baronet of Inverleith and his aunt, Mary Rochead, was the wife of Sir Francis Kinloch, 3rd Baronet.

He was educated at Queen's College, Oxford.

== Career ==
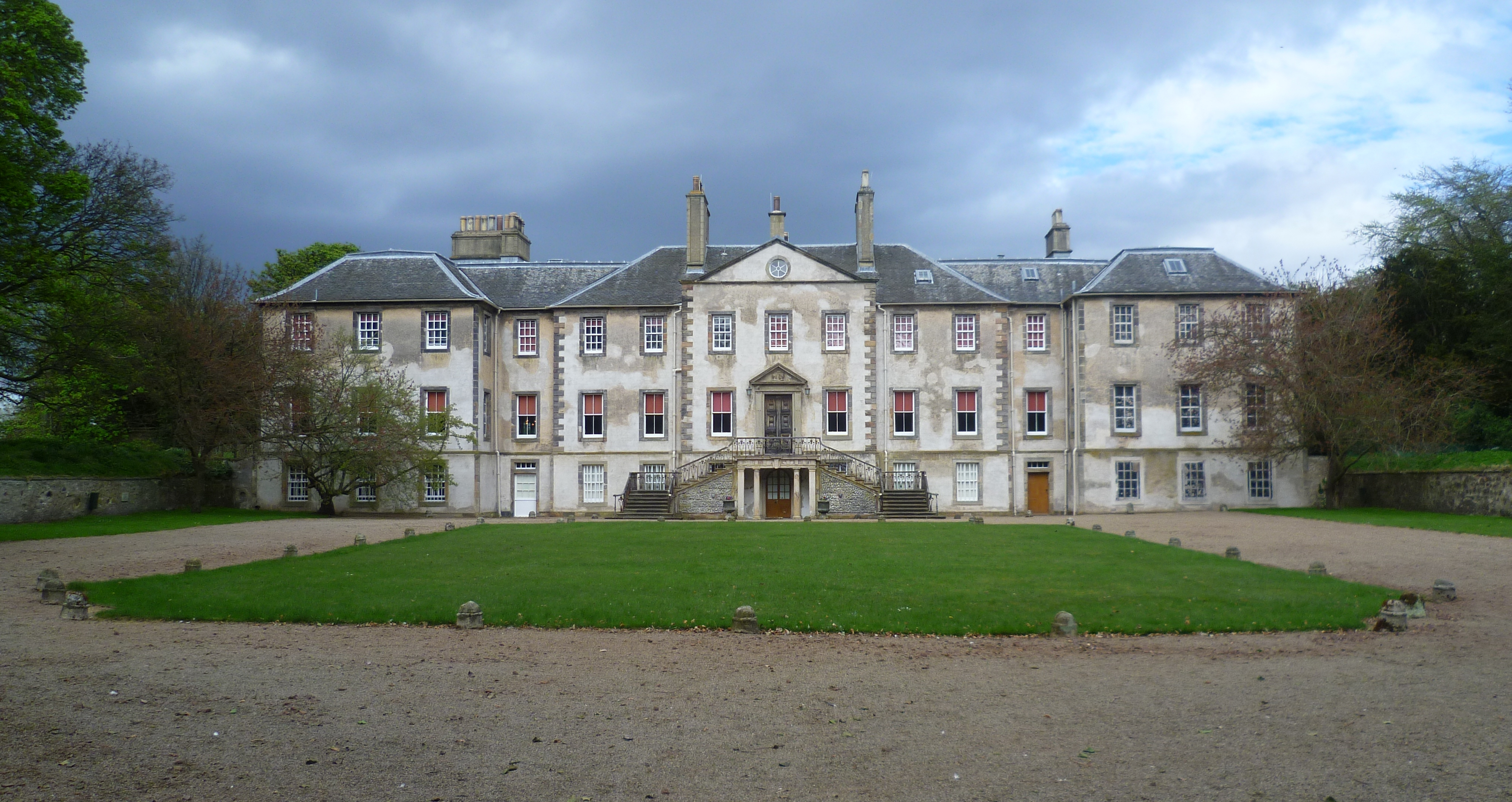
Newhailes, the Dalrymple home

Sir James succeeded his father in 1722 as the Member of Parliament for Haddington Burghs. He also served as the Principal Auditor of the Exchequer in Scotland.

== Personal life ==
He married Lady Christian Hamilton (1702–1770), daughter of Thomas Hamilton, 6th Earl of Haddington. They lived at Newhailes, a country house between Edinburgh and Musselburgh bought by his father, and which Sir James extended. and had fifteen children, including:

- David Dalrymple, 3rd Baronet (1726–1792), who married Anne Broun, daughter of George Broun, Lord Coulston, in 1763. After her death, he married Helen Fergusson, daughter of James Fergusson, Lord Kilkerran, in 1770.
- Hugh Dalrymple (d. 1784), who married Lady Helen Wemyss, daughter of James Wemyss, 5th Earl of Wemyss, in 1754
- James Dalrymple (d. 1791), who married Elizabeth St Clair, daughter of Charles St Clair of Herdmanston, in 1773.
- John Dalrymple (d. 1779), who served as Lord Provost of Edinburgh in 1770; he married Anne Young Pringle, daughter of Walter Pringle, in 1774.
- Alexander Dalrymple (1737–1808), a hydrographer and geographer.

Sir James died on 24 February 1751 and Lady Christian died on 30 June 1770. Upon his death, he was succeeded in the baronetcy by his eldest son and heir, David.

Parliament of Great Britain
Preceded by Sir David Dalrymple, Bt	Member of Parliament for Haddington Burghs; 1722–1734	Succeeded by James Fall
Baronetage of Nova Scotia
Preceded by David Dalrymple	Baronet (of Hailes); 1721–1751	Succeeded by David Dalrymple
