= Maria Christina, Duchess of Teschen =

Duchess of Teschen from 1766 to 1798

Maria Christina
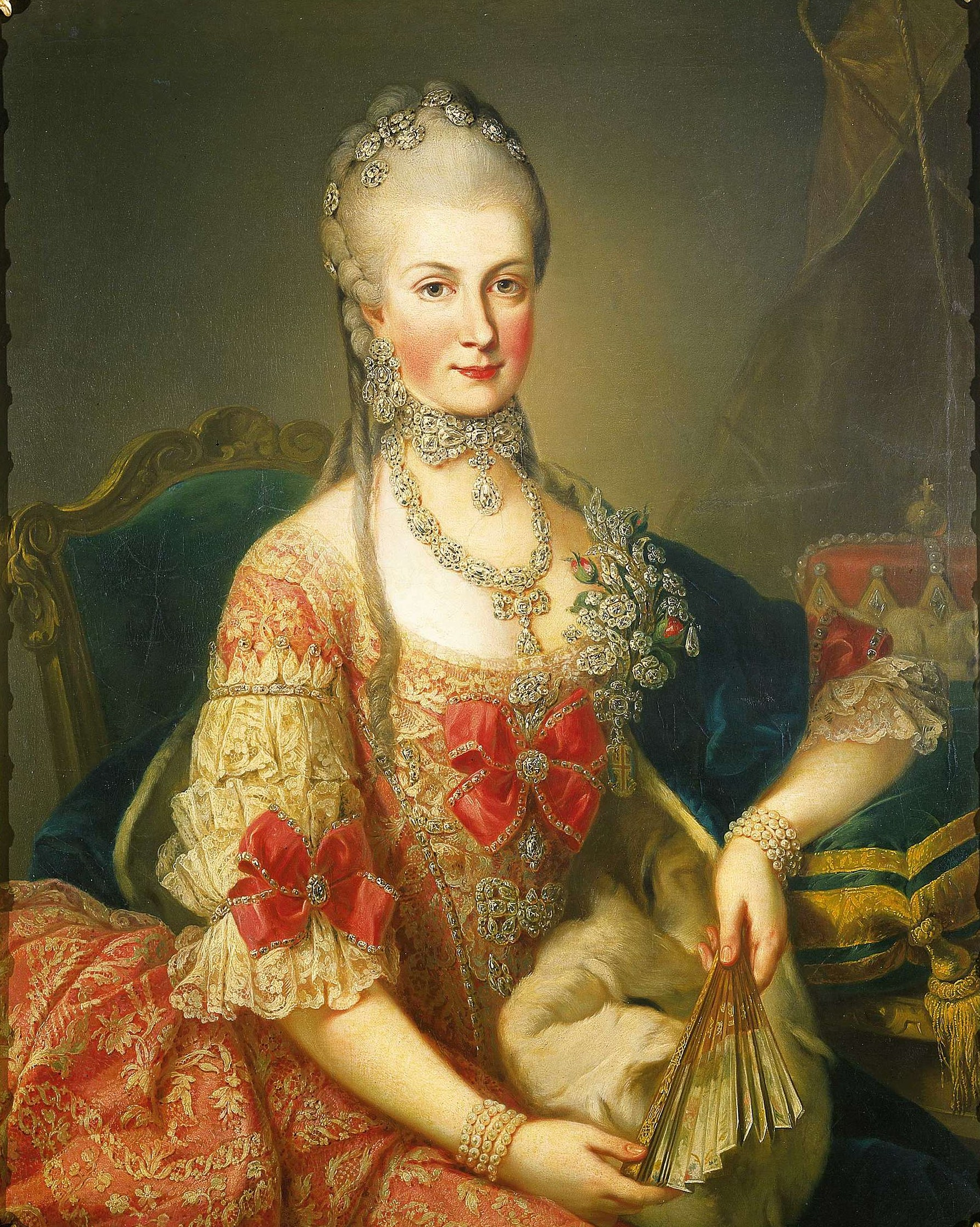
- Portrait by Martin van Meytens, 1765

Duchess of Teschen
- Reign: 8 April 1766 – 24 June 1798
- Predecessor: Joseph II
- Successor: Albert Casimir
- Alongside: Albert Casimir

Governor of the Austrian Netherlands
- Tenure: 29 November 1780 – 1 March 1792
- Predecessor: Prince Charles Alexander of Lorraine
- Successor: Archduke Charles of Austria
- Alongside: Albert Casimir
- Born: 13 May 1742; Vienna, Archduchy of Austria, Holy Roman Empire
- Died: 24 June 1798 (aged 56); Vienna, Archduchy of Austria, Holy Roman Empire
- Burial: Imperial Crypt
- Spouse: Albert Casimir, Duke of Teschen (m. 1766)
- Issue: Princess Maria Theresia of Saxony
Names
- English: Mary Christina Joan Josephine Antonia; German: Maria Christina Johanna Josefa Antonia; French: Marie Christine Jeanne Josèphine Antoinette
- House: Habsburg-Lorraine
- Father: Francis I, Holy Roman Emperor
- Mother: Maria Theresa
- Religion: Roman Catholicism

Maria Christina, Duchess of Teschen (Maria Christina Johanna Josepha Antonia; 13 May 1742 – 24 June 1798), was the fifth child of Maria Theresa of Austria and Francis I, Holy Roman Emperor. Married in 1766 to Prince Albert of Saxony, the couple received the Duchy of Teschen, and she was appointed Governor of the Austrian Netherlands jointly with her husband during 1781–1789 and 1791–1792. After two expulsions from the Netherlands (in 1789 and 1792), she lived with her husband in Vienna until her death.

== Biography ==
=== Early years ===
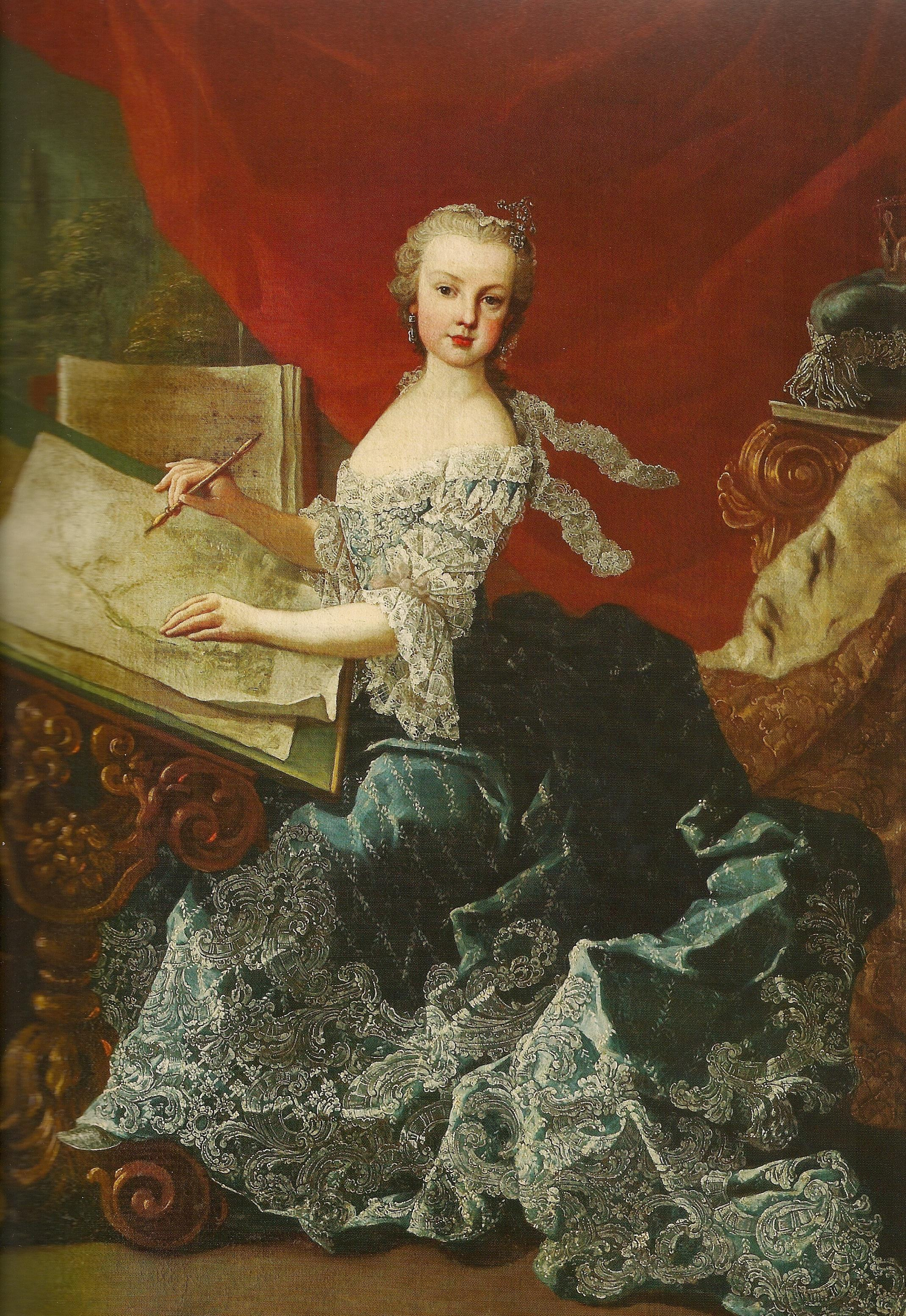
Archduchess Maria Christina, by Martin van Meytens, 1750

The fifth child and fourth (but second surviving) daughter, Maria Christina was born on the 25th birthday of her mother, on 13 May 1742 in Vienna, Austria. The next day she was baptized in the Hofburg with the names Maria Christina Johanna Josepha Antonia; Christina was named after her grandmother Elisabeth Christine of Brunswick-Wolfenbüttel, however, she was always called Marie or Mimi at the Viennese court and by her family. She was Maria Theresa's favourite child, as can be seen in the letters that the Empress wrote to her. Little is known about her early childhood. In a letter dated 22 March 1747 the Prussian ambassador in Vienna, Count Otto Christoph von Podewils, described the then five-year-old Maria Christina as pretty and witty.

The Archduchess, capricious and spirited in her youth, received a particularly loving education from her parents. That notorious preference that Maria Christina received from her mother caused the intense jealousy of her brothers and sisters, who avoided her and criticized her prominent position within the family more and more vehemently. The dislike of her siblings increased later in life, since Maria Theresa increasingly used her to exercise influence over the other members of the family.

Maria Christina got along very badly with her governess, Princess Maria Karoline von Trautson-Falkenstein. However, the Empress only agreed to change her governess in 1756, when she appointed the widowed Countess Maria Anna Vasquez (née Kokorzowa) to the position. Maria Christina's relationship with Vasquez was much better, and a few years later Countess Vasquez was even named Obersthofmeisterin of Maria Christina's household.

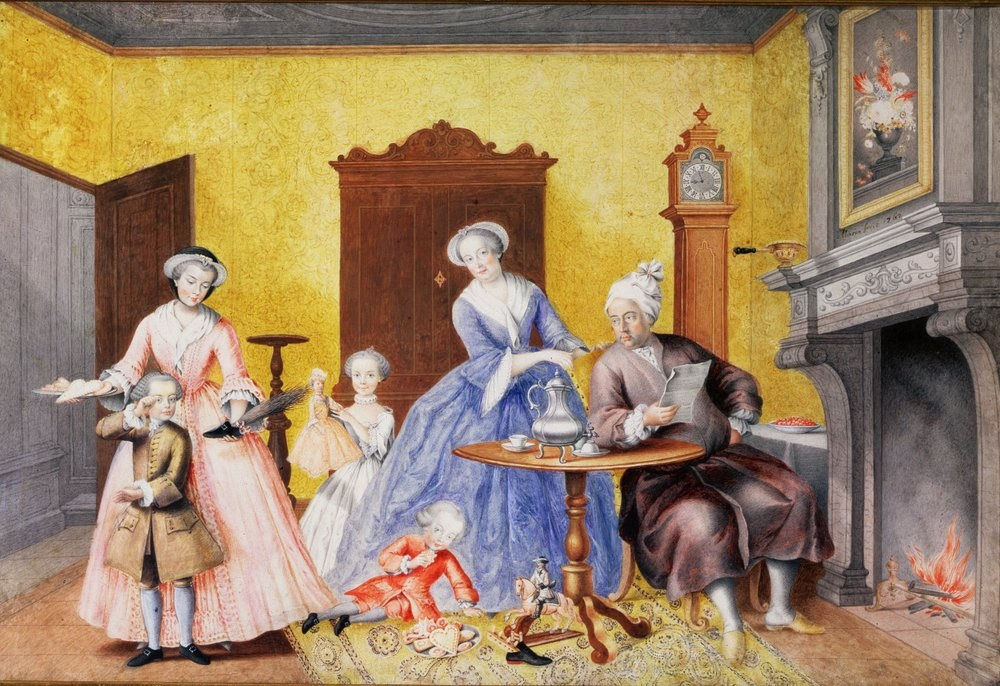
The Imperial family celebrating Saint Nicholas, by Archduchess Maria Christina, 1762

Beautiful, highly intelligent but also artistically gifted, Maria Christina enjoyed a conscientious education. The Jesuit Father Lachner taught her several languages and history. The Archduchess learned, among other things, perfect Italian and French, which, according to Podewils, she particularly liked to speak, as well as quite good English. She also proved to be a talented painter very early. In Schönbrunn Palace her drawings of the imperial family were exhibited which attest to her great artistic talent. She painted some family members including herself and also some copies of genre paintings by Dutch and French masters. One particular portrait made by Maria Christina in gouache about 1762 showed the Imperial family celebrating Saint Nicholas: there the Emperor is shown reading the newspaper and the Empress serving the coffee, while her three youngest siblings (Ferdinand, Maria Antonia and Maximilian) were with their gifts.

The 17-year-old Maria Christina had a romance with Louis Eugene, Duke of Württemberg, but a marriage between them displeased the Empress, who believed that the third son of the Duke of Württemberg was not of enough rank for an Archduchess. In early January 1760 Princes Albert and Clemens of Saxony arrived at the Imperial Court and both were warmly received by the Emperor and Empress. Prince Albert met the lovely Archduchess on the occasion of a concert, in which she participated, and soon he developed a great affection for her, as he recalled in his memoirs. At the end of January 1760, Albert and Clemens returned from Vienna.

In the following years, Maria Christina developed an intense love affair with Princess Isabella of Parma, who married the future Joseph II, Holy Roman Emperor on 6 October 1760. Among other things, the two young women often played together. The beautiful, educated, and very sensitive Isabella, who detested the court ceremonial and her position as wife of the Habsburg heir, wanted a more sensual destiny; however, despite these inner feelings, she appeared to be cheerful and satisfied with her fate. While her husband loved her very deeply, she was reserved towards him. In contrast, for Maria Christina, she had a heartfelt affection, expressed in about 200 letters between them, usually written in French. They spent so much time together that they were compared to Orpheus and Eurydice. Isabel and Mimi were united not only by a shared interest in music and art but also by a deep mutual love.

Maria Christina made a formal description of Isabella, in which she portrayed her as amiable, kind, and generous, but she also did not overlook her weaknesses. The early demise of her sister-in-law (who was more and more inclined to melancholy and a growing obsession with death) on 27 November 1763 following childbirth complications, left Maria Christina heartbroken.

=== Marriage ===
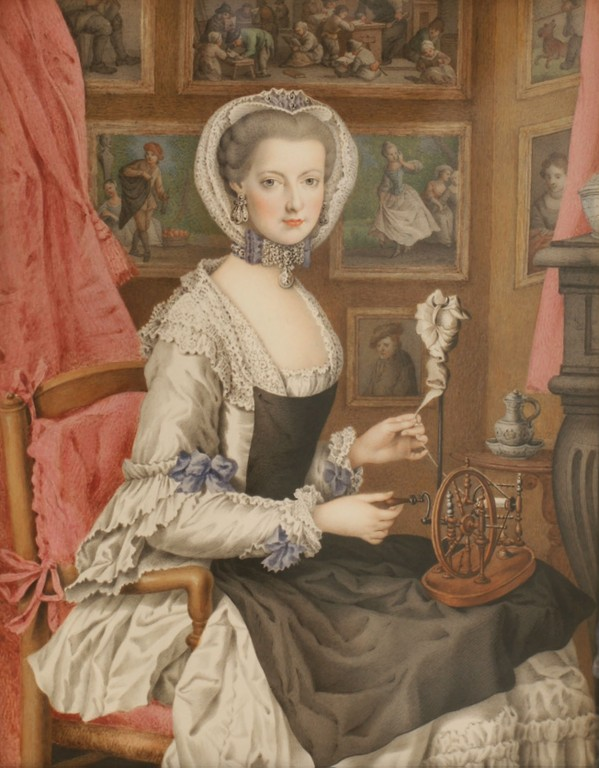
Self-portrait after an engraving of Johann Casper Heilmann, ca. 1765

In December 1763, Prince Albert of Saxony returned to Vienna to express his condolences to the Imperial family for Isabella of Parma's death. He had become a good friend of the late Isabella after her marriage with the future Joseph II and, as he noted in his diary, also developed a close relationship with Maria Christina. In 1764 the Saxon prince met the Archduchess, firstly in Vienna in the spring and later more often in Pressburg, at that time capital of Hungary. After these visits, Maria Christina fell deeply in love with Albert, who, despite his affection for the Archduchess, did not believe that he could win her hand in marriage because of his relatively weak and politically unstable position for the imperial standards. But then he was invited to Vienna to study a new service regulation for the cavalry, to participate in hunts and amusements of the Imperial court, and received the invitation of Maria Christina to give free rein to his feelings for her but not yet publicly.

Maria Christina had a strong influence over her mother, who approved of her relationship with Albert, but the lovers were forced to keep their relationship secret because the Emperor wanted her to marry her first cousin, Prince Benedetto of Savoy, Duke of Chablais (son of Elisabeth Therese of Lorraine, younger sister of Francis I). The Empress advised her impatient daughter to appear calm and cautious with regard to her liaison with Albert, and to rely on her; Maria Theresa promised to arrange the match with Albert.

In July 1765, the Imperial family travelled to Innsbruck for the wedding of Archduke Leopold, Grand Prince of Tuscany, with Infanta Maria Luisa of Spain; Albert also participated in the celebrations. Since the Duke of Chablais was also present, Maria Christina and her beloved had to proceed more carefully. One month after Leopold's marriage, the Emperor suddenly died (18 August) from either a stroke or heart attack. The Imperial family was badly affected by this death, including Maria Christina, whose marriage plans were now no longer a hindrance since her mother had long been on her side. In consequence, she was the only daughter of Maria Theresa who didn't marry for political reasons; however, out of respect for the Emperor's death, a period of mourning had to be observed first before her wedding could take place.

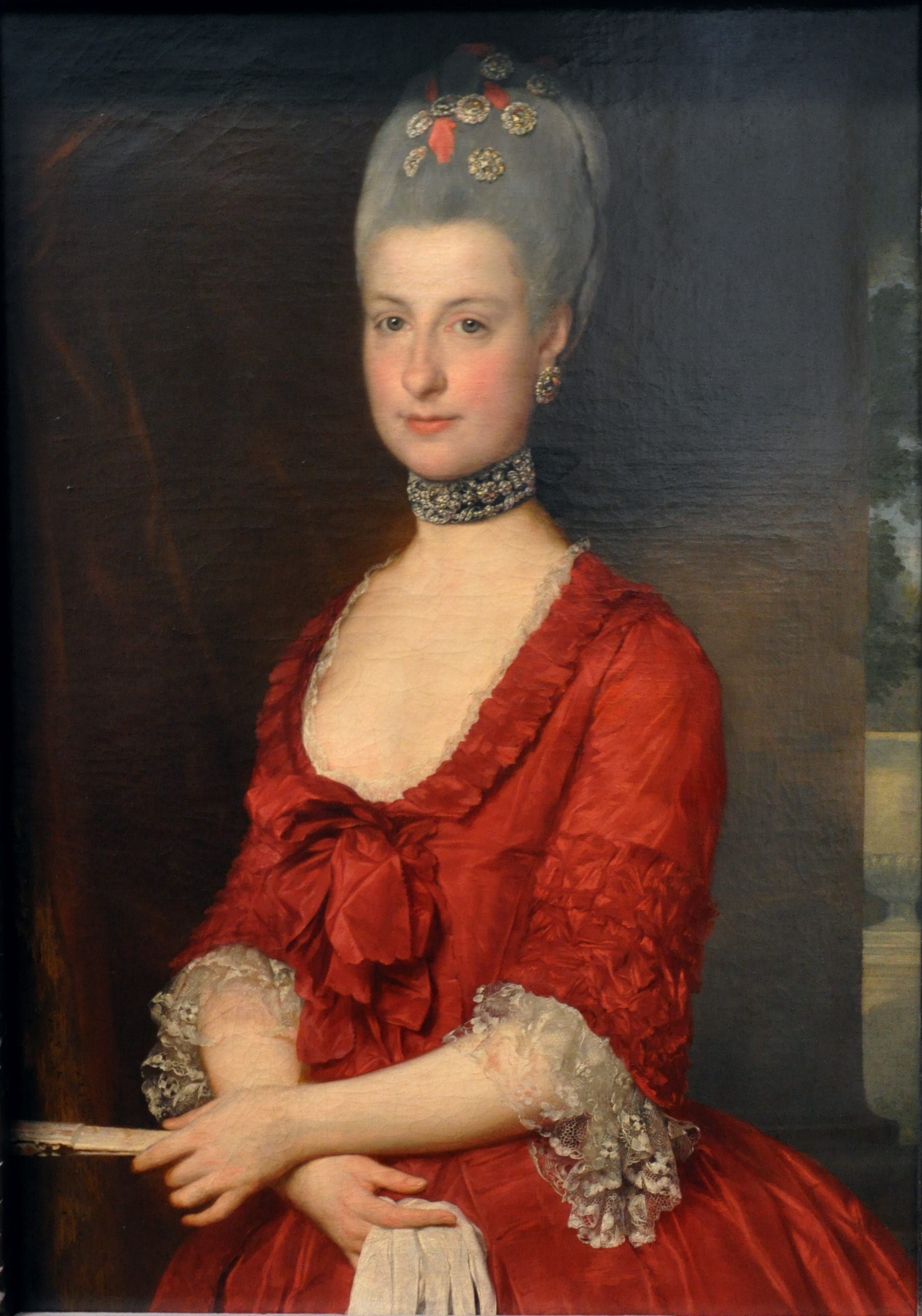
Maria Christina, Duchess of Teschen, by Marcello Bacciarelli, 1766

Maria Christina, Duchess of Teschen, by Johann Baptist von Lampi the Elder, ca. 1766–1770

The wedding preparations began as early as November 1765. Maria Theresa was worried that the young couple could not live comfortably. In December, Albert was appointed Field Marshal and Statthalter of Hungary; these posts forced him and his future wife to live in Pressburg. The local castle was renovated at a cost of 1.3 million florins, and the Dowager Empress took care of even the furniture and tableware. In Laxenburg castle complex Maria Christina and Albert received the Grünnehaus. When the couple came to Vienna later, they were allowed to stay in the Hofburg Palace. Finally, Maria Christina received a rich dowry: the Silesian Duchy of Teschen (whereupon Albert became entitled as Duke of Saxe-Teschen); the towns of Mannersdorf, Ungarisch Altenburg, and other lordships; and the amount of ƒ100,000. The household of the couple included about 120 people. These gifts received by Maria Christina caused the displeasure and envy of her brothers and sisters.

On 7 January 1766, Albert (whose succession rights over the Saxon throne won him several adepts) received a warm welcome in Pressburg by the citizens. On 2 April the engagement took place and six days later, on 8 April, the wedding took place in the chapel of Schloss Hof. During the ceremony (in which the Dowager Empress was present), Maria Christina wore a white, pearl-decorated mousseline dress, and Albert his military uniform. However, the rest of the guests were dressed in black because of the ongoing court mourning. Soon afterward, the newlyweds settled in Pressburg.

Maria Christina's luck in being permitted to marry the man she loved embittered Maria Theresa's other daughters, who already resented their mother's favouritism. One of her sisters, the Archduchess Maria Amalia, was also in love with a minor prince, Charles of Zweibrücken, but was forcibly married off to Ferdinand, Duke of Parma. She remained estranged from her mother for the rest of the Dowager Empress' life.

In the first weeks after the wedding, Maria Christina, Albert, and Maria Theresa started a correspondence. The Dowager Empress gave her daughter, whom she greatly missed, advice on how to behave towards her husband. She advised her to cultivate an attitude based on Christian values. The happily married couple held a court at the palace in Pressburg, arranged festivals, and also traveled frequently to Vienna.

=== Issue ===
Maria Christina gave birth to a daughter named Princess Maria Theresia Josepha Johanna Nepomucena of Saxony, on 16 May 1767, but the child lived only one day, dying on 17 May 1767. Maria Christina developed puerperal fever, while in mid-June Albert fell ill with smallpox; however, they were both able to recover.

Name	Birth	Death	Notes
Princess Maria Theresia Josepha of Saxony	16 May 1767	17 May 1767	Died shortly after her birth, is buried in the Imperial Crypt

Since Maria Christina was unable to have any more children due to her difficult childbirth, in 1790 she persuaded her brother Leopold, Grand Duke of Tuscany, to let her and her husband adopt one of his youngest sons, Archduke Charles, in order to have an heir.

Name	Birth	Death	Notes
Archduke Charles of Austria	5 September 1771	30 April 1847	Nephew and adopted son, later known as the winner of the Battle of Aspern-Essling.

=== Life in Hungary and trip to Italy ===
Maria Christina, Duchess of Teschen, by Johann Zoffany, 1776

In Pressburg, Maria Christina and her husband were able to host a luxurious court life with frequent parties and visits home to Vienna. They soon succeeded in obtaining the affection of the Hungarian nobility and citizens, and devoted themselves to their common interest in art, which made Pressburg a cultural center during their time there; it was here that they began their acquisition of drawings and engravings, which was to become the famous Albertina Art Collection.

From December 1775 to July 1776, Maria Christina and Albert made an extended trip to Italy to visit her siblings Leopold (in Florence), Maria Carolina (in Naples), Maria Amalia (in Parma) and Ferdinand (in Milan), after which she reported to their mother about their lives. Furthermore, the couple paid a visit to Pope Pius VI. However, Maria Christina's weak health and sadness increased, as Albert was in active military service in 1777–1778 during the War of the Bavarian Succession.

=== Governor of the Austrian Netherlands ===
==== First years ====
After the death of Charles Alexander of Lorraine on 4 July 1780 Maria Christina and Albert were, according to Maria Theresa's will, appointed as joint governors of the Austrian Netherlands. But the Dowager Empress died on 29 November, during the preparations of the couple's journey. Joseph II now assumed sole sovereignty as Holy Roman Emperor; he had a bad relationship with his sister and had been jealous of her privileged position and intimate relationship with their mother. In order to get her out of Vienna, he confirmed her and her husband's appointment as governors but reduced their income. On 3 June 1781, Maria Christina and Albert left Vienna and were greeted in Tienen by Georg Adam, Prince of Starhemberg, and designated Minister Plenipotentiary of the Austrian Netherlands on 9 July; the next day (10 July), they made their official entrance into Brussels, taking their residence there.

The Emperor did not allow his sister the financial resources corresponding to her position. Maria Christina complained to her brother Leopold and criticized how she had been treated in the division of Maria Theresa's inheritance. She and her husband were also unable to play an independent political role but were limited to be symbolic figureheads. Even before the appointment of her sister and brother-in-law, Joseph II (who for seven weeks strictly controlled the Austrian Netherlands) found the administration and internal conditions to be negative and decided to carry out profound reforms. He discussed his plans with his ministers and leading officials, and the joint governors were only to execute the orders and sign the decrees issued by the Emperor through the advisers he appointed to them. Without any real power, Maria Christina and Albert limited themselves to receiving foreign guests and enjoying hunting. Between 1782 and 1784, they had the Palace of Laeken constructed for their summer residence, where they completed their famous Albertine art collection.

In the Austrian Netherlands, however, strong social tensions prevailed. The property was largely owned by the members of the upper two estates, the nobility enjoyed a clear preference in the tax and judiciary systems, there were great shortcomings in the administration, trade hindered economic development and foreign trade suffered through the barrier of the Scheldt for the carriage of goods. Joseph II's plans to trade portions of Bavarian territory for portions of the Austrian Netherlands or the 1784–1785 forced lifting of the Scheldt barrier for navigation, failed. Instead, the Prince of Starhemberg was replaced in 1783 as Minister Plenipotentiary by Count Ludovico di Barbiano di Belgiojoso, who made himself immensely unpopular. The Emperor, who lacked a clear understanding of the situation of the Austrian Netherlands, imposed drastic reforms especially in the field of education, which caused a lot of resistance and the loss of the Catholic Church's position in November 1781, and in March 1783 different monasteries were abolished. He also proposed at the administrative level the introduction of a centralized administration.

==== Trip to Vienna and France ====
Maria Christina and Albert traveled to Vienna in the winter of 1785-1786 after being called by Joseph II. The Emperor received his guests politely and invited them to festivals. Due to the visit, Joseph II ordered the presentation of the operas Der Schauspieldirektor of Wolfgang Amadeus Mozart and Prima la musica e poi le parole of Antonio Salieri on 7 February 1786 in a private performance at Schönbrunn Palace. The couple, however, did not succeed in persuading the Emperor to take a more cautious approach in the realization of his reform plans for the Austrian Netherlands and the withdrawal of the regulations.

By the end of July 1786, Maria Christina and her husband arrived in Paris, following an invitation from King Louis XVI. In the Palace of Versailles she met her sister Queen Marie Antoinette (with whom she had a cold relationship), and the Imperial ambassador of France, Florimond Claude, Comte de Mercy-Argenteau. Mimi's mockery and habit of retelling everything to her mother made her other sisters distance themselves from her. This included Marie Antoinette who treated Maria Christina as just another state guest in Versailles. Maria Christina’s request to see the Petit Trianon, Marie Antoinette's private retreat, was ignored. In their short visit to France, the couple visited museums and factories, were present in court festivities and met the Finance Minister Jacques Necker and his daughter, the famous writer Madame de Staël. In mid-September 1786 the governors returned to Brussels.

==== Resistance to Joseph II's reform plans ====
In 1787, Maria Christina and Albert were forced to introduce the radical Josephine Reforms in the Austrian Netherlands, which included a far-reaching modification of the central government institutions there, a transformation of the provincial division which was equivalent to the dissolution of the existing provinces, and a reorganization of the judicial organization. She was ordered to do so by Joseph II through Count Ludovico di Belgiojoso, but did so unwillingly and predicted that they would lead to protests. Against the Imperial reforms were mainly formed two opposition groups: first, the Statists, led by Hendrik Van der Noot, who was supported by numerous nobles and clerics and wanted to retain the traditional relationship with the Habsburgs. On the other hand the Vonckists, named after their leader Jan Frans Vonck, wanted a democratic rule with elections by means of the vote.

The reforms lead to violent riots. On 30 May 1787, a mob, who demanded that Belgiojoso be removed from power, broke into the royal residence in Brussels and forced Maria Christina and Albert to retract the Imperial decree. Maria Christina described it to her brother:

"People thronging in thousands, with their hats blazoned with the arms of Brabant, made it a day of terror - all the more so as we had certain information that it was intended to begin that very evening the pillage of the royal and ecclesiastical treasuries, that the minister and those members of the Government who were in ill odour [sic] were to be put to death, and complete independence declared."

For Joseph II, however, who condemned the indulgence of the couple, a revocation of his orders was out of the question. He wanted to suppress possible riots and therefore increased the number of troops and sent Count Joseph Murray to command regiments in the Austrian Netherlands. He also ordered Count di Belgiojoso and the joint governors to go to Vienna. Maria Christina and Albert arrived to the Imperial court in late July 1787, but could not bring about any change of opinion in the Emperor. Count Ferdinand von Trauttmansdorff was appointed the new Minister Plenipotentiary and the ambitious General Richard d’Alton took the place of the compromised Count Murray.

In January 1788, Maria Christina and Albert returned to the Austrian Netherlands, where the potential for conflict was clearly increased. New unrest was foreseen. In April 1788, they officially warned the Emperor that the apparent tranquility in the country was only external and that fear and disharmony prevailed, but assured that they had done their best to restore confidence. Although Trauttmansdorff wanted to push through the Josephine reforms in a somewhat milder style, he still saw strong opposition from the Brabant states. Hendrik Van der Noot played a leading role in this resistance. After his escape in August 1788, he tried in Breda (with the support of the Dutch Republic) to find soldiers to fight, attempting to hire Prussian soldiers against the imperial government violence in the Austrian Netherlands. Nevertheless, the resistance of the Brabant estates became increasingly violent.

==== Twofold expulsion ====
During the summer of 1789, rebellions arose in the Austrian Netherlands. Inspired by the French Revolution, they were fomented by a secret society called Pro aris et focis which sought for the formation of a patriotic army. Maria Christina and her husband defied Joseph II's order to return to Vienna and left Laeken for Brussels. On 24 October 1789 started the Brabant Revolution: from Breda the anti-imperial "Patriot Army" invaded Brabant and in the next few weeks they gained this province and Flanders under their control. On 18 November, the joint governors, though reluctant, had to flee. After a journey through Luxembourg, Trier and Koblenz they arrived in Bonn at the side of Maria Christina's youngest brother Archduke Maximilian Francis, Archbishop-Elector of Cologne, staying a long time in the Poppelsdorf Palace. In the meantime, Hendrik Van der Noot was able to enter triumphally in Brussels on 18 December 1789.

Maria Christina was bitterly angry about her expulsion, but she was still trying to take steps to continue the rule of her brother in the Austrian Netherlands. In particular, she wrote on 12 December 1789 to the Archbishop of Mechelen, that the Emperor would now apply a different behavior towards the rebellious provinces if they submitted. Despite many promises from the prelate, nothing happened. In addition, Maria Christina condemned the publication of her letters to Trauttmansdorff.

In January 1790, the Austrian Netherlands became in the independent United Belgian States with Van der Noot as his First Minister. The seriously ill Emperor Joseph II died on 20 February and was succeeded by his younger brother Leopold II, with whom Maria Christina had a better understanding. They exchanged many letters where she advised the new Emperor to either initiate negotiations about the regaining of his rule over the Austrian Netherlands or began a military action. The enlightened new Emperor could contain the unrest in different parts of the Austrian dominion through concessions and started negotiation of a ceasefire in the war against the Turks, while in the meantime took advantage of the constant conflicts between the Statists and Vonckists, who put the already new Republic on the edge of civil war. The Austrians reconquered Brussels without a fight at the beginning of December 1790. Maria Christina and Albert (who after their stay in Bonn moved firstly to Frankfurt, then to Vienna and finally in Dresden), returned to Brussels on 15 June 1791 as joint governors. The population received them kindly, but also suspiciously.

In 20–21 June 1791, the Governors was ready to welcome Louis XVI and Marie Antoinette during their intended escape during the Flight to Varennes. When the royal party was arrested near the border and escorted back to Paris, the brothers of Louis XVI, the counts of Provence and Artois, appeared in Brussels and asked Maria Christina to make a military intervention and send troops across the border to France and apprehend the royal party before they reached Paris, but Maria Christina refused, stating that she would need the emperor's permission to perform such an act, by which time it would already be too late.

Maria Christina and Albert this time had more actual power than what Joseph II had allowed them, although after the Brabant Revolution they turned to a more authoritarian rule. By her good cooperation with Leopold II and his new Minister Plenipotentiary, Count Franz Georg Karl von Metternich (father of the later famous politician and statesman Klemens von Metternich), the joint governors ensured a certain degree of stability through a policy of amnesty.

Leopold II died suddenly on 1 March 1792, amidst rumours of poisoning or secret assassination. Maria Christina and Albert were confirmed as joint governors by Leopold II's son and successor Francis II. However, in October the Austrian Netherlands were invaded by Revolutionary France. The French General Charles François Dumouriez decisively defeated the Austrian troops commanded by Prince Albert and Charles de Croix at the Battle of Jemappes on 6 November; as a result, the embittered joint governors were again forced to flee, after they were able to evacuate their art collection by sea. However, one of the three ships on which their treasures were transported was destroyed as a result of a hurricane.

=== Last years and death ===
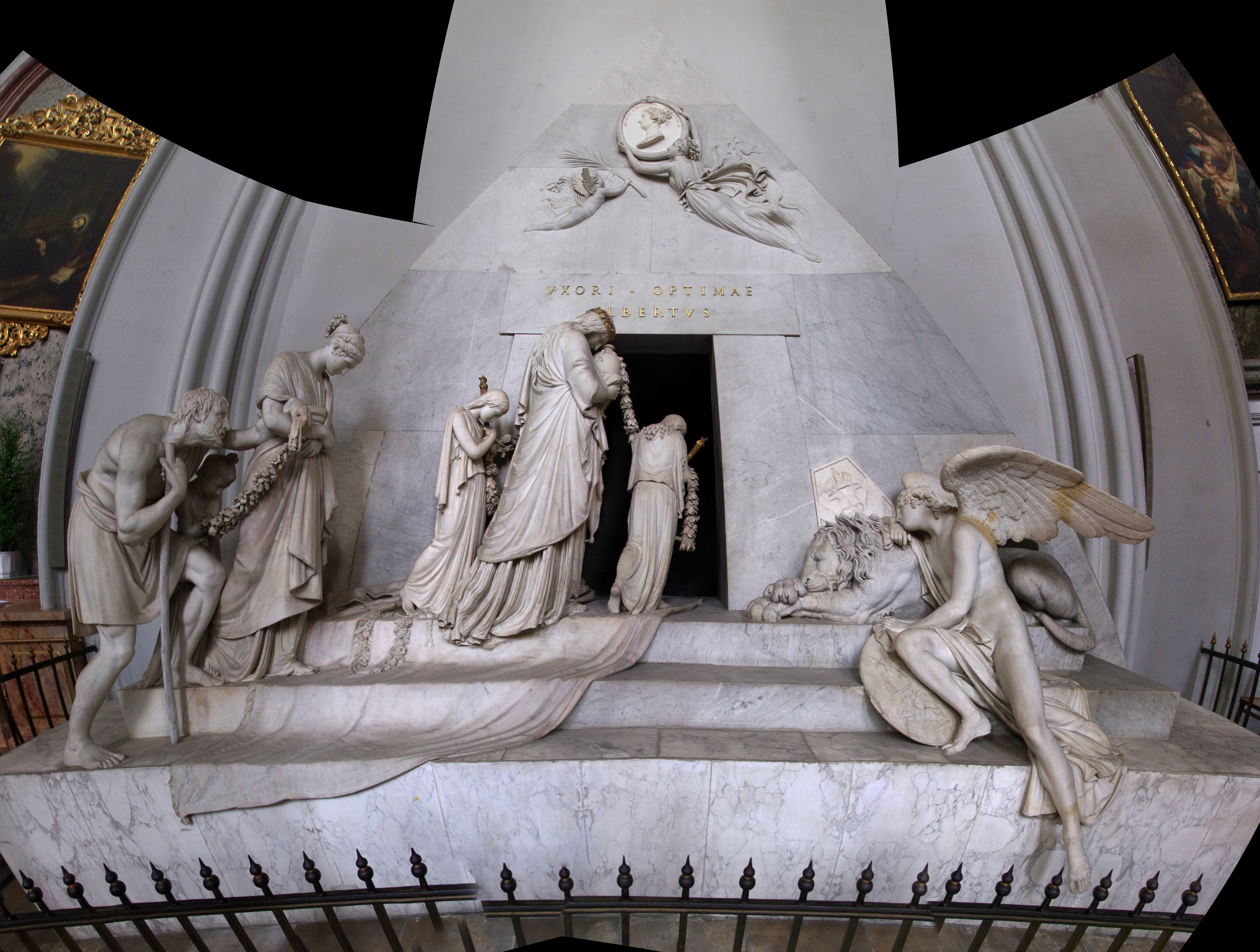
Cenotaph to Marie Christine of Austria in the Augustinerkirche, by Canova

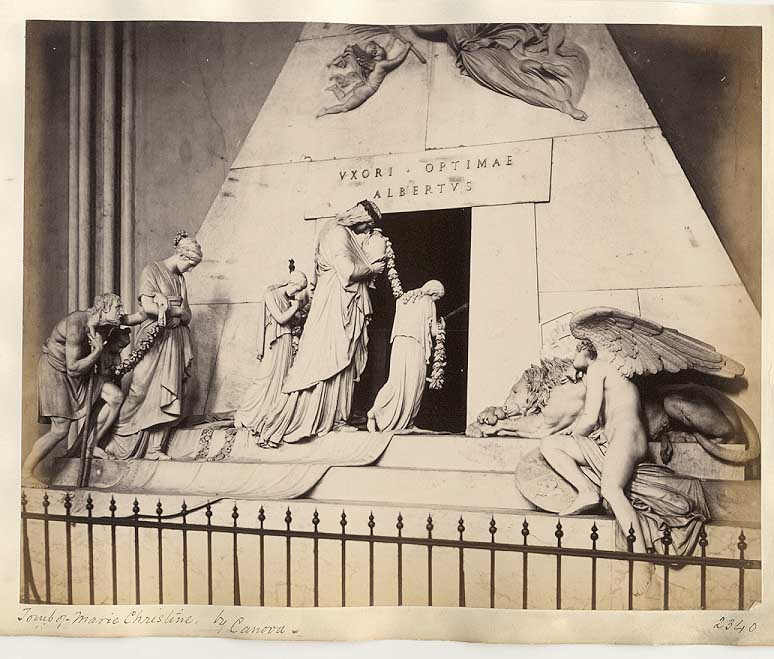
Other detail of the cenotaph

Maria Christina no longer exercised any political influence. After a stay in Münster during the winter of 1792-1793 she moved with the seriously ill Albert to his hometown Dresden. They lived harmoniously, but without their previous warm relationship, and therefore no longer had such an elaborate court. At the beginning of 1794 they learned that the Emperor would now give them financial support. After their permanent move to Vienna, Maria Christina and her husband lived in the palace of Count Emanuel Silva-Tarouca. In the future, Albert was mainly concerned in his art collection. After the rise of Napoleon, Maria Christina was deeply shocked when she knew about the military clashes and the signing of the Treaty of Campo Formio (18 October 1797) between Napoleon and Francis II.

In 1797 Maria Christina, who had become melancholic, began to suffer from a stomach disease. She went to bathing in Teplitz in July 1797 and had a short-term improvement in her health, but soon suffered again with great pain. Due to the restructuring of the Augustinerbastei, she and her husband rented the Palais Kaunitz and moved there. After a new short recovery, Maria Christina became more and more sick in the middle of June 1798; after writing to Albert a farewell letter in which she mentioned her deep and lifelong love for him, she died the following day on 24 June 1798 aged 56. She was buried in the Tuscan Vault of the Imperial Crypt in Vienna. Her heart was buried separately and is located in the Herzgruft, behind the Loreto Chapel in the Augustinian Church within the Hofburg Palace complex in Vienna.

After the death of his wife, the deeply saddened Albert built an impressive cenotaph for Maria Christina in the Augustinian church. In the ornaments of this tomb, a work of the famous neoclassical sculptor Antonio Canova, was notably seen that not a single Christian symbol is displayed but several Freemasons motifs are shown. The flat pyramid wall contains a medallion of Maria Christina's and figures in Carrara marble. It bears the inscription Uxori Optimae Albertus, implying a dedication from Albert to his excellent wife. In a book published in 1805 by Van de Vivere, which deals with the tomb of Canova and is also available in a German translation of the same year, it is clearly shown that the grave monument has arisen out of the Christian thought, although the impact of Enlightenment is noticeable. With the language of allegory Canova created mourning symbols and figures which were used in antiquity and in the early Christian period. After his death in 1822, Albert was buried next to her and their daughter.

== Arms ==
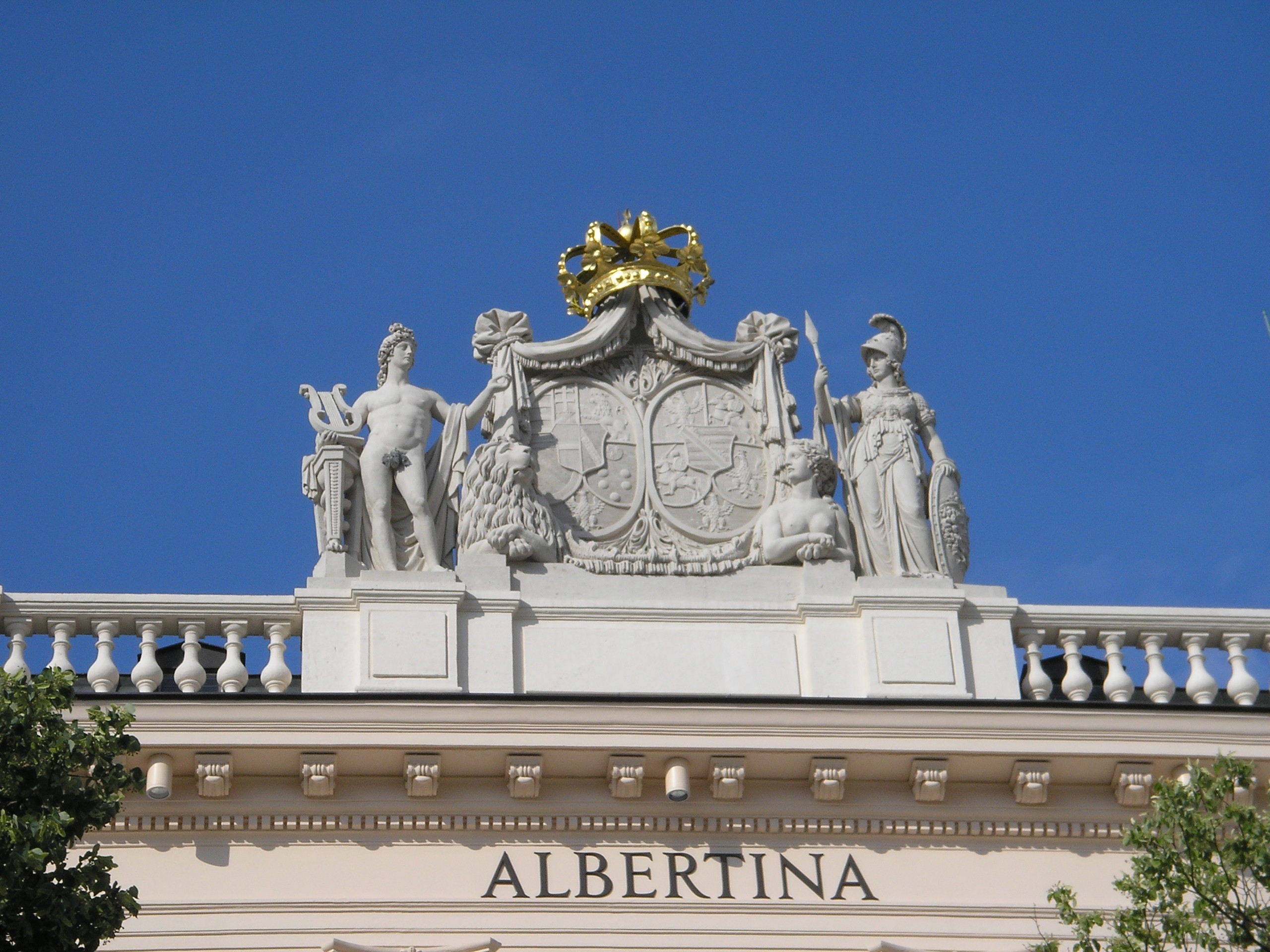
Arms of Marie Christine of Austria and Albert of Saxony, Dukes of Teschen

The personal coat of arms of the Duchess of Teschen impales Consort's shield, the arms of King Augustus II of Poland – Quarterly, I and IV gules, a eagle argent, armed, beaked, langued, liée, and crowned Or (for Poland); II and III Gules, a knight armed cap-à-pie mounted on a horse salient argent, brandishing a sword proper and maintaining a shield azure charged with a cross of Lorraine Or (for Lithuania); overall and inescutcheon barry sable and Or, a crancelin vert (for Saxony); - enté en point azure an eagle or (for Teschen) (her husband's shield) to the dexter (viewer's left) with her brother's shield, the arms of Holy Roman Emperor Joseph II – Quarterly, I barry of eight, gules and argent, impaling gules a patriarchal cross argent on a trimount vert (for Hungary); II gules a lion rampant argent, queue fourchée crossed in saltire, armed, langued, and crowned Or (for Bohemia); III bendy of six Or and azure, a bordure gules (for Burgundy); IV Or, in annulo six torteaux, the torteau in chief replaced by a roundel azure charged with three fleurs-de-lis Or (for the Medici family); overall and inescutcheon gules a fess argent (for Austria) impaling Or a bend gules three alerions argent (for Lorraine); - enté en point azure an eagle or (for Teschen).

== Ancestry ==
Ancestors of Maria Christina, Duchess of Teschen

16. Nicholas II, Duke of Lorraine
8. Charles V, Duke of Lorraine
17. Claude Françoise of Lorraine
4. Leopold, Duke of Lorraine
18. Ferdinand III, Holy Roman Emperor
9. Eleonore of Austria
19. Eleonora Gonzaga
2. Francis I, Holy Roman Emperor
20. Louis XIII of France
10. Philippe I, Duke of Orléans
21. Anne of Austria
5. Élisabeth Charlotte d'Orléans
22. Charles I Louis, Elector Palatine
11. Elisabeth Charlotte of the Palatinate
23. Charlotte of Hesse-Kassel
1. Archduchess Maria Christina, Duchess of Teschen
24. Ferdinand III, Holy Roman Emperor (= 18)
12. Leopold I, Holy Roman Emperor
25. Maria Anna of Austria
6. Charles VI, Holy Roman Emperor
26. Philip William, Elector Palatine
13. Eleonor Magdalene of Neuburg
27. Elisabeth Amalie of Hesse-Darmstadt
3. Maria Theresa of Austria
28. Anthony Ulrich, Duke of Brunswick-Wolfenbüttel
14. Louis Rudolph, Duke of Brunswick-Wolfenbüttel
29. Elisabeth Juliana of Holstein-Norburg
7. Elisabeth Christine of Brunswick
30. Albert Ernest I, Prince of Oettingen-Oettingen
15. Christine Louise of Oettingen-Oettingen
31. Christine Friederike of Württemberg

== Bibliography ==
- Hanns Schlitter, Briefe der Erzherzogin Marie Statthalterin der Niederlande an Leopold II. nebst einer Einleitung zur Geschichte der französischen Politik Leopolds II. Gerold, Vienna 1896 on-line
- J. C. H. Blom: History of the Low Countries
- Guida Myrl Jackson-Laufer: Women Rulers Throughout the Ages: An Illustrated Guide
- Stollberg-Rilinger, Barbara (2017). Maria Theresia: Die Kaiserin in ihrer Zeit. Eine Biographie. Munich: C.H. Beck. ISBN 978-3-406-69748-7.
- Friedrich Weissensteiner: Die Töchter Maria Theresias. Bastei-Lübbe, Bergisch Gladbach 1996, ISBN 3-404-64145-0, p. 57–103
- Michael Erbe: Belgien, Niederlande, Luxemburg, 1993, ISBN 3-17-010976-6, p. 172–179

Maria Christina, Duchess of Teschen House of Habsburg-Lorraine Cadet branch of the House of Lorraine Born: 13 May 1742 Died: 24 June 1798
Regnal titles
Preceded by Joseph II	Duchess of Teschen; 1766–1798 with Albert Casimir	Succeeded by Albert Casimir
Political offices
Preceded by Charles Alexander of Lorraine	Governor of the Austrian Netherlands; 1781–1793	Succeeded by Charles of Austria-Lorraine
