= Robert Murray (died 1672) =

Scottish politician

Sir Robert Murray

Member of Parliament for Edinburgh
- In office 1661–1663 Serving with James Borthuik, John Mylne
- Preceded by: John Tomfon
- Succeeded by: Sir Andrew Ramsay; John Somervell

Provost of Edinburgh
- In office 1660–1662
- Preceded by: Sir James Steuart
- Succeeded by: Sir Andrew Ramsay

Personal details
- Died: 1672
- Spouses: Helen Hay (died 1663) Jean Dickson (m. 1665)
- Relations: Sir Alexander Murray, 1st Baronet (grandson); Sir Joseph Murray, 3rd Baronet (grandson)
- Children: 6

Sir Robert Murray of Cameron (died 1672) was a Scottish politician.

== Early life ==
He was the second son of James Murray (died 1649), of Deuchar in Selkirkshire, who was a younger son (the second son to be called James) of Patrick Murray of Philiphaugh. Among his siblings were James Murray of Skirling (heir of their father), MP for Peeblesshire, and Patrick Murray of Deuchar, MP for Selkirkshire.

== Career ==
Murray was a merchant in Paris before returning to Edinburgh. In 1656, he acquired the estate on which Panmure House was later built but in 1666, "after legal proceedings, he had to part with it to James Wilkie, son of Archibald Wilkie of Harlowmuir, the original owner. In 1670 Murray bought Cameron, the joint appendage of the Prestonfield estate, from a daughter of Sir Alexander Hamilton, brother of the first Earl of Haddington. Murray was proprietor of Cameron until 1677, when he sold it to Sir James Dick, Bart. Murray, who seems to have been the owner of Prestonfield also.

In 1660 he became Provost of Edinburgh, succeeding Sir James Steuart. In 1661, he represented Edinburgh in the Parliament of Scotland, serving until 1663. Murray was also a member of the Privy Council of Scotland from 1669 to 1672.

== Personal life ==
Murray was married to Helen Hay (d. 1663), a daughter of Alexander Hay of Kenneth. Together, they were the parents of five sons, including:

- James Murray, who died young.
- Alexander Murray of Melgund (d. 1682), who married Janet Rochead, a daughter of Sir James Rochead, 1st Baronet of Inverleith. After his death, she married Sir David Dalrymple, 1st Baronet.
- John Murray (b. 1656)
- Robert Murray (c. 1655–1719), who married Marguerite Therese Booninck in c. 1710.
- William Murray (1662–1703).

After the death of his first wife, he married on 1 June 1665 to Jean Dickson, a daughter of John Dickson of Hartree. They were the parents of one son:

- James Murray (b. 1669).

Murray died in 1672 and was buried at Greyfriars in Edinburgh on 8 February 1672. His widow died in early 1677 and was buried on 4 February 1677.

=== Descendants ===
Though his eldest son Alexander, he was a grandfather of Sir Alexander Murray, 1st Baronet.

Through his son Robert, he was a grandfather of Sir Joseph Murray, 3rd Baronet.
