= Ludwig, Prince of Starhemberg =

Austrian diplomat

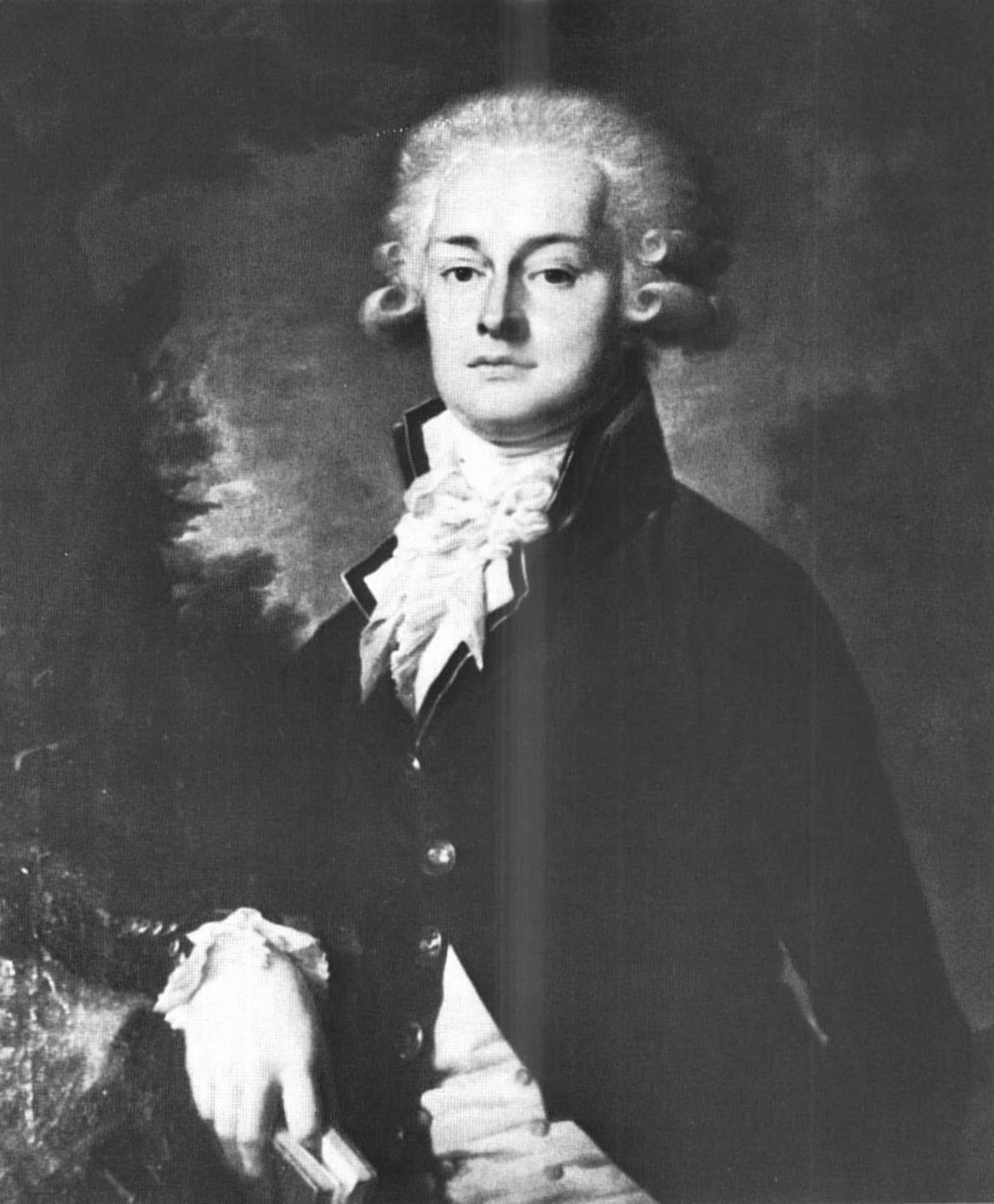
- Born: March 12, 1762; Paris
- Died: September 2, 1833 (aged 71); Dürnstein

Prince Ludwig Joseph Maximilian von Starhemberg (Paris, 12 March 1762 – Dürnstein, Lower Austria, 2 September 1833) was an Austrian diplomat and since 1802 Knight of the Order of the Golden Fleece.

== Early life ==
Ludwig von Starhemberg was the son of Georg Adam, Prince of Starhemberg, the Austrian ambassador to the French court of Louis XV between 1754 and 1766, and his second wife, Princess Franziska von Salm-Salm. His godfather was the Louis XV, in person.

== Career ==
Ludwig von Starhemberg spent most of his youth in Brussels, where his father was appointed Minister Plenipotentiary between 1770 and 1783. Ludwig was introduced into society at an early age and received a thorough education, which included learning the classical languages of Greek and Latin as well as mathematics, physics, history, philosophy, religion and solid physical training.

The diplomatic career of the young Count and later Prince Ludwig began in Russia, when he was sent in 1790 to Empress Catherine II in St. Petersburg with a letter of notification of Emperor Leopold II's accession to the throne. After his return, he became Envoy in The Hague, but in the same year he was moved to London, where he stayed as Austrian Ambassador for a total of 17 years, with only a one-year break in 1808, until February 1810. The aim of his policy was to tie Great Britain militarily and financially as a partner to the great powers Austria, Prussia and Russia against Napoleonic France. Due to the high cost of living and representation, he got into a severe financial crisis, with high debts.

After a further professional stay as Envoy in Turin (1805–1810), he withdrew completely into private life, temporarily living in Eferding. He died in 1833 at his castle in Dürnstein.

== Personal life ==
He married in Brussels in 1781 Princess Marie Luise Franziska von Arenberg (1764–1835), daughter of Field Marshal Duke Charles Marie Raymond, 5th Duke of Arenberg and his wife, Countess Louise Margarethe von der Marck-Schleiden (1730–1820). They had 5 children :

- Ernestine Margarete (1782–1852), married Frederic Augustus Alexander, Duke of Beaufort-Spontin, had issue,
- Georg Adam (1785–1860), married Princess Aloysia Helena Camilla von Auersperg, no issue,
- Franziska (1787–1864), married Count Istvan Zichy, had issue,
- Leopoldine Georgine Marie Louise (1793–1863), married Joseph Ferdinand, Count von Thürheim, had issue,
- Georges Frédéric Louis (1802–1834), married Countess Valerie Georgine Marie Louise of Beaufort-Spontin, no issue.

In 1786, he moved to Vienna. When his father's older brother, Count Ernst von Starhemberg, died childless, he inherited the dominions of Schaunberg, Eferding and Wagenberg in Upper Austria. In Vienna he joined the Masonic lodge Zur Neugekrönte Hoffnung, which also included Emanuel Schikaneder and Wolfgang Amadeus Mozart.

== Sources ==
- Constantin von Wurzbach: "Starhemberg, Ludwig Joseph Max Fürst." In: Biographisches Lexikon des Kaiserthums Oesterreich (Biographical Lexicon of the Empire of Austria). Part 37 Kaiserlich-königliche Hof- und Staatsdruckerei, Vienna 1878, p. 209–213 (digitalised).
- Archive online
- ADB:Starhemberg, Ludwig Fürst von
- ÖBL:Starhemberg Ludwig Fürst von
