= Albert Casimir, Duke of Teschen =

Duke of Teschen from 1766 to 1822

Albert Casimir
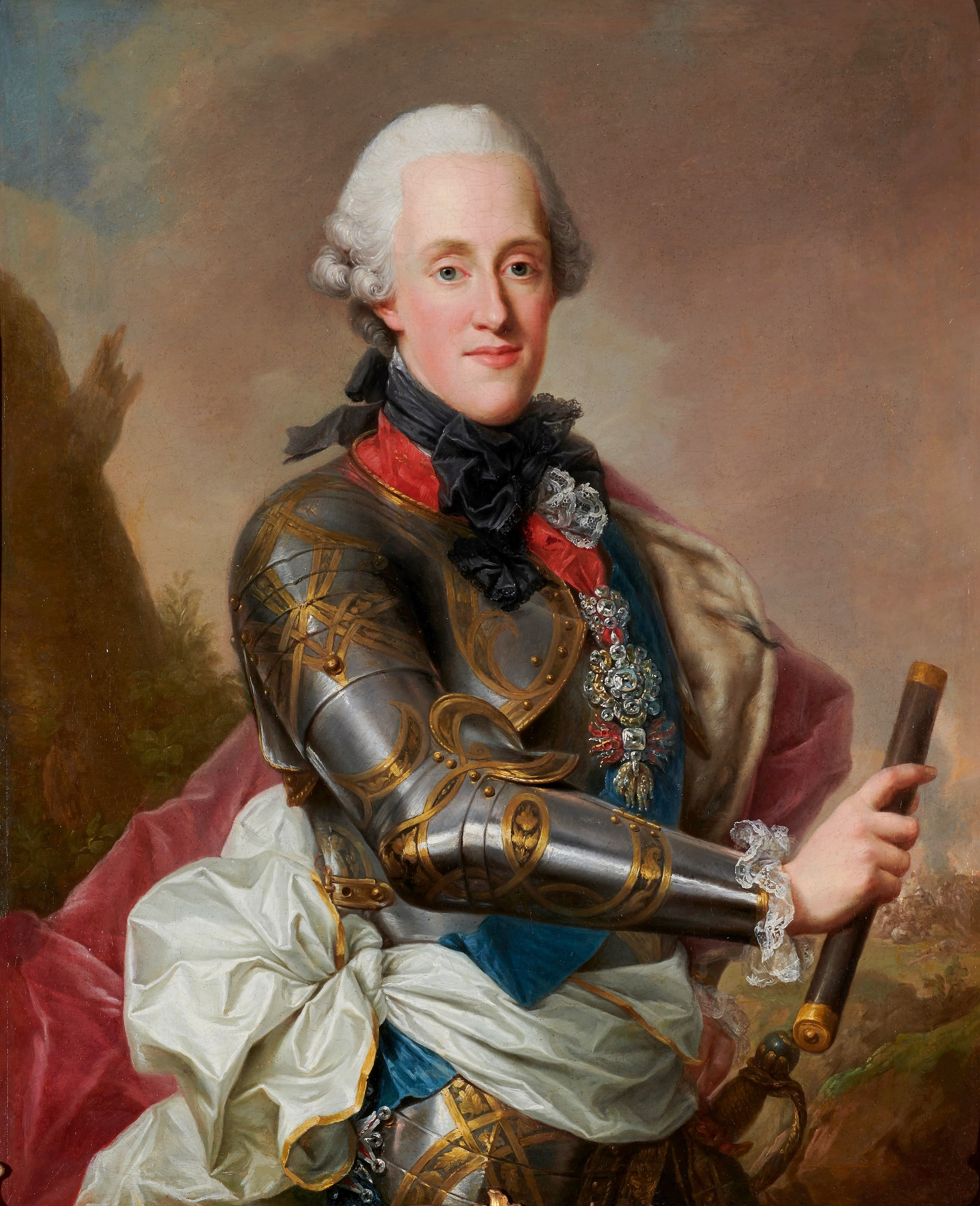
- Portrait by Marcello Bacciarelli, c. 1766

Duke of Teschen
- Reign: 8 April 1766 – 10 February 1822
- Predecessor: Joseph II
- Successor: Charles
- Alongside: Maria Christina

Governor of the Austrian Netherlands
- Tenure: 29 November 1780 – 1 March 1792
- Predecessor: Prince Charles Alexander of Lorraine
- Successor: Archduke Charles of Austria
- Alongside: Maria Christina
- Born: 11 July 1738; Moritzburg, Electorate of Saxony
- Died: 10 February 1822 (aged 83); Vienna, Austria
- Burial: Ducal Crypt, Vienna
- Spouse: Maria Christina, Duchess of Teschen (m. 1766; died 1798)
- Issue: Princess Maria Theresia Josepha Johanna Nepomucena
Names
- Albert Kasimir August Ignaz Pius Franz Xavier
- House: Wettin
- Father: Augustus III of Poland
- Mother: Maria Josepha of Austria
- Religion: Roman Catholicism

Prince Albert Casimir of Saxony, Duke of Teschen (German: Albert Kasimir von Sachsen-Teschen; 11 July 1738 – 10 February 1822) was a Saxon prince from the House of Wettin who married into the Habsburg imperial family. He was noted as an art collector and founded the Albertina in Vienna, one of the largest and finest collections of old master prints and drawings in the world.

== Biography ==
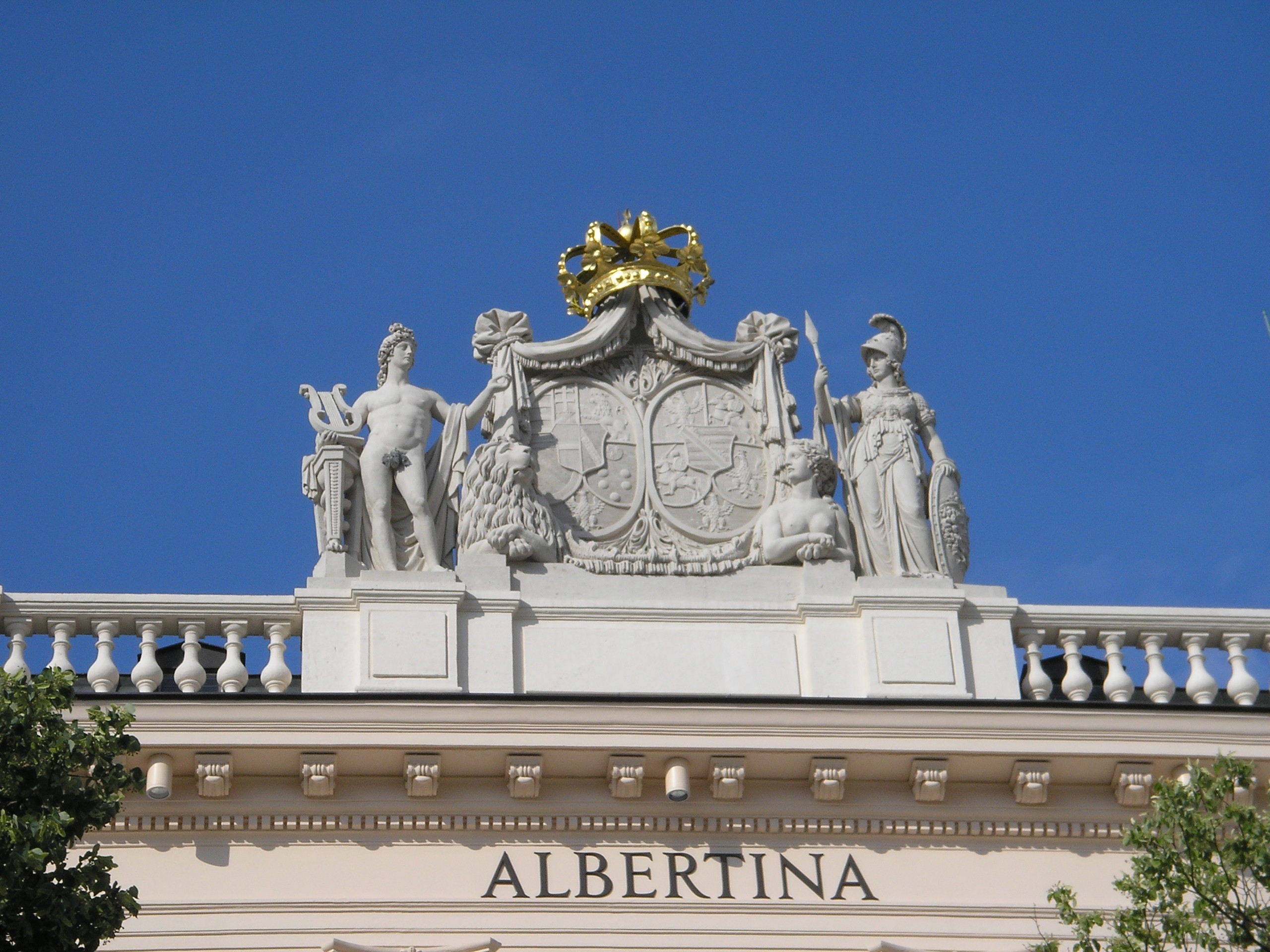
Coat of arms of Maria Christina of Austria and Albert Casimir of Saxony

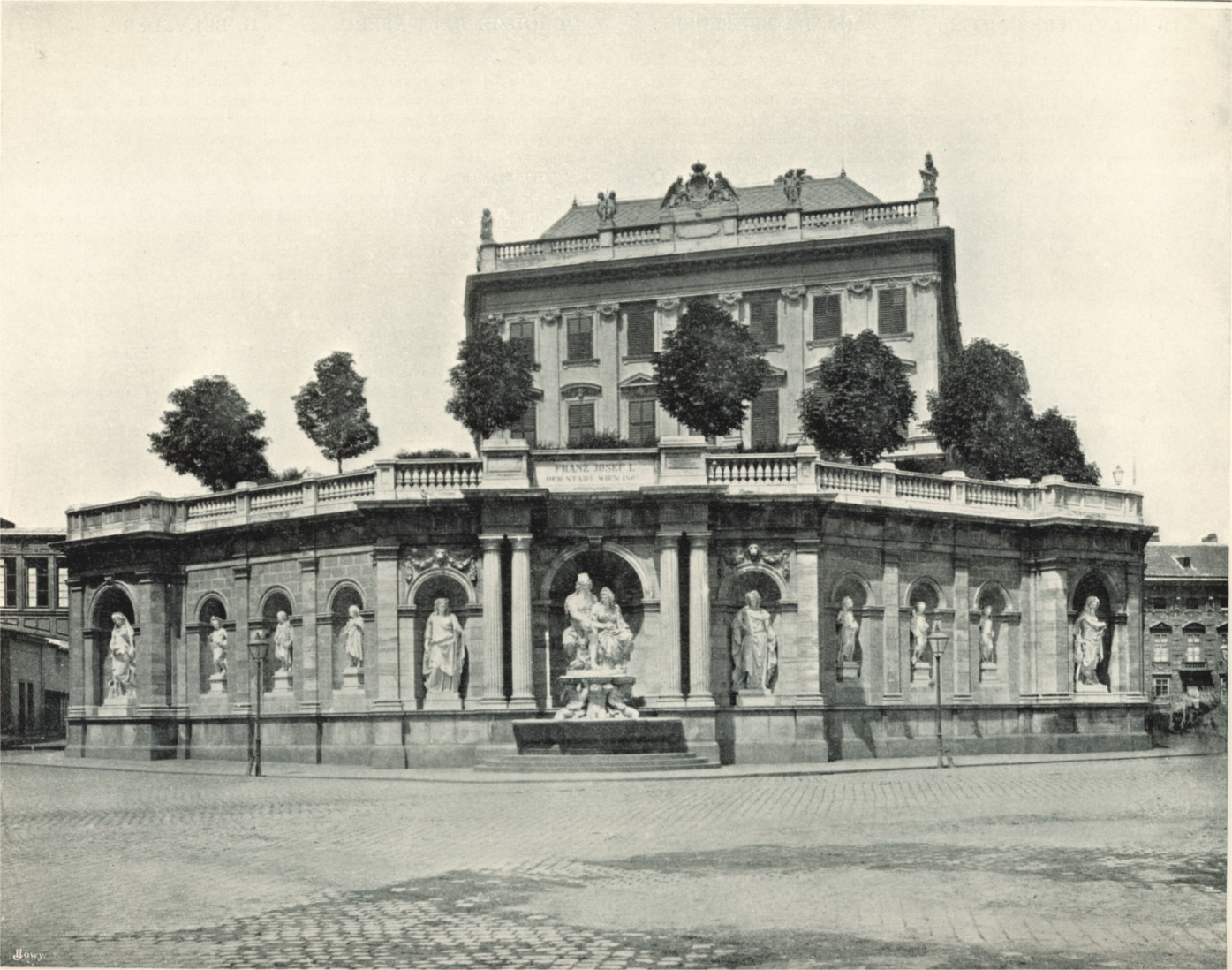
Palace of Prince Albert, today houses his Albertina collection

Albert was a younger son of King Augustus III of Poland (who was also Elector of Saxony) and his wife, Maria Josepha of Austria, a first cousin of Empress Maria Theresa, being the eldest daughter of Emperor Joseph I. Prince Albert of Saxony, Duke of Teschen, was also one of the godparents to his namesake, Prince Albert of Saxe-Coburg and Gotha.

Young Albert was specifically chosen by Archduchess Maria Christina of Austria to be her husband, after her romance with Louis Eugen of Württemberg. This was a special favour granted by her mother, Empress Maria Theresa of Austria, because marriages of imperial children were usually used for diplomatic purposes. Still, the betrothal and wedding had to wait until the death of her father, Emperor Francis I, and the wedding decorations were black because it occurred during the official mourning period after his death. From his father-in-law's estate, Albert received the territory of Teschen in Austrian Silesia and was accordingly given the title of Duke of Teschen.

The Silesian Duchy of Teschen had been inherited by Emperor Francis through his father's Gonzaga ancestry, as compensation for the lost Duchy of Montferrat, taken from them in favor of the dukes of Savoy. Archduchess Maria Christina, the daughter of Francis of Lorraine, received the duchy among her dowry. Prince Albert of Saxony thus became the Duke of Teschen, the only non-Habsburg to become such after the title passed into Habsburg control. Their only daughter;

- Princess Maria Theresia Josepha Johanna Nepomucena of Saxony (b. Vienna, 16 May 1767 - d. Vienna, 17 May 1767) died in infancy

Upon the death of the widowed Albert in 1822, Teschen was granted to their adopted son, Archduke Charles of Austria, who became Duke of Teschen and started the Habsburg-Lorraine branch of Dukes of Teschen.

Albert was royal governor of Hungary from 1765 to 1781, with his seat at Bratislava Castle and his summer residence in Halbturn Castle at Neusiedl. He was then made Governor of the Austrian Netherlands, along with his wife. In Brussels, they built a palace in Laeken (the present-day home of the Belgian royal family) as their seat. There, he assembled the beginnings of his vast art collection, which he took with him when the couple had to flee from Brussels to Vienna in 1793, due to the French Revolution and following his military defeat by invasion forces at the Battle of Jemappes.

In Vienna, a palace adjoining the Hofburg, originally designed by Emanuel Teles Silva-Tarouca, was enlarged for them by architect Louis Montoyer. That palace is today called the Albertina, after Albert, and houses the collection he started. Only two-thirds of his collection survives, because one of the cargo ships bringing it from Brussels sank en route. After his return to Vienna, he used as an advisor Adam von Bartsch, the Curator of the Imperial prints collection and the greatest prints scholar of his age.

After the early death of his wife in 1798 of typhus, Albert lived only for his art collection, which he bequeathed to his nephew and adopted son, Archduke Charles of Austria.

Next door to his palace, in the Augustinerkirche, Albert had a famous memorial to his wife carved by Antonio Canova. The couple are buried in tombs 111 and 112 in the Tuscan Vault of the Imperial Crypt in Vienna, with their hearts in urns 40 and 28 in the nearby Herzgruft, and their viscera in urns 75 and 63 of the Ducal Crypt in Vienna's cathedral.

== Ancestry ==
Ancestors of Albert Casimir, Duke of Teschen

8. John George III, Elector of Saxony
4. Augustus II of Poland
9. Anna Sophie of Denmark
2. Augustus III of Poland
10. Christian Ernst, Margrave of Brandenburg-Bayreuth
5. Christiane Eberhardine of Brandenburg-Bayreuth
11. Sophie Louise of Württemberg
1. Albert Casimir, Duke of Teschen
12. Leopold I, Holy Roman Emperor
6. Joseph I, Holy Roman Emperor
13. Eleonore Magdalene of Neuburg
3. Maria Josepha of Austria
14. John Frederick, Duke of Brunswick-Calenberg
7. Wilhelmine Amalie of Brunswick-Lüneburg
15. Benedicta Henrietta of the Palatinate

Albert Casimir, Duke of Teschen House of Wettin Born: 11 July 1738 Died: 10 February 1822
Regnal titles
Preceded by Joseph II	Duke of Teschen; 1766–1822 with Maria Christina	Succeeded by Charles II
