= Giulio Visconti Borromeo Arese =

Italian soldier and diplomat

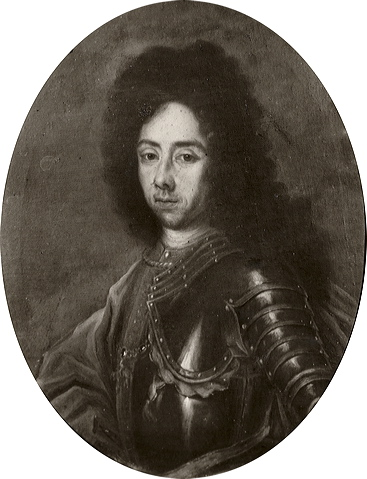
Giulio Visconti Borromeo Arese

Giulio Visconti Borromeo Arese, Count of Pieve di Brebbia (1664 - 1750) was an Italian soldier and diplomat in the service of the Habsburg monarchy. From 1726 to 1732 he headed the administration of the Austrian Netherlands. From 1733 until the end of Habsburg rule there in 1735, he was Viceroy of Naples.

== Life ==
Giulio was the third son of Count Fabio Visconti and Margharita Arese. The family was a side branch of the noble family of Visconti of Milan, which can be traced back to Charlemagne. This line died out with him in the male line, since his marriage to Teresa Cusani, produced only one daughter.

After the end of the War of the Spanish Succession, he entered the service of the Habsburgs, the new masters of his homeland in the Duchy of Milan. In 1726 he was appointed Minister plenipotentiary of the Austrian Netherlands and thus the highest administrative officer under the governorship of Archduchess Maria Elisabeth. During this time he was also entrusted with diplomatic missions to London.

His promotion to the independent position of Viceroy of Naples in 1733 can be interpreted as an indication of the satisfaction of the court in Vienna. His actual term of office there only lasted until 1734, when the Austrian troops and the administration had to vacate the country before the advancing Spanish troops led by Charles of Bourbon.

In a decree of Emperor Charles VI from June 18, 1738, he is described as Grandee of Spain, Knight of the Order of the Golden Fleece, Privy Councilor of State, General of the Artillery and Obersthofmeister of the Empress.

== Sources ==
- Geneanet
- the article in the German Wikipedia, Giulio Visconti Borromeo Arese.
