= James Fall (politician) =

Scottish politician

Captain James Fall (pronounced Faw) (c. 1685–1743) was Scottish MP for Haddington Burghs (1734–1742).

One of four brothers who built a mercantile empire centred on Dunbar, as MP he represented the interests of the family. The family also dominated Dunbar town council, where Fall's career continued; he served as bailie (magistrate) from October 1735 until his death.

Fall residedat Dunbar (now Lauderdale) House, which he had built, at the north end of Dunbar High Street. He married Jean Murray and had a daughter, Janet, who married Sir John Anstruther. He was buried at Dunbar on 9 December 1743.

Parliament of Great Britain
Preceded by Sir James Dalrymple, Bt	Member of Parliament for Haddington Burghs; 1734–1742	Succeeded by Sir Hew Dalrymple, Bt
