= Georg Adam, Prince of Starhemberg =

Austrian diplomat (1724–1807)

Georg Adam von Starhemberg
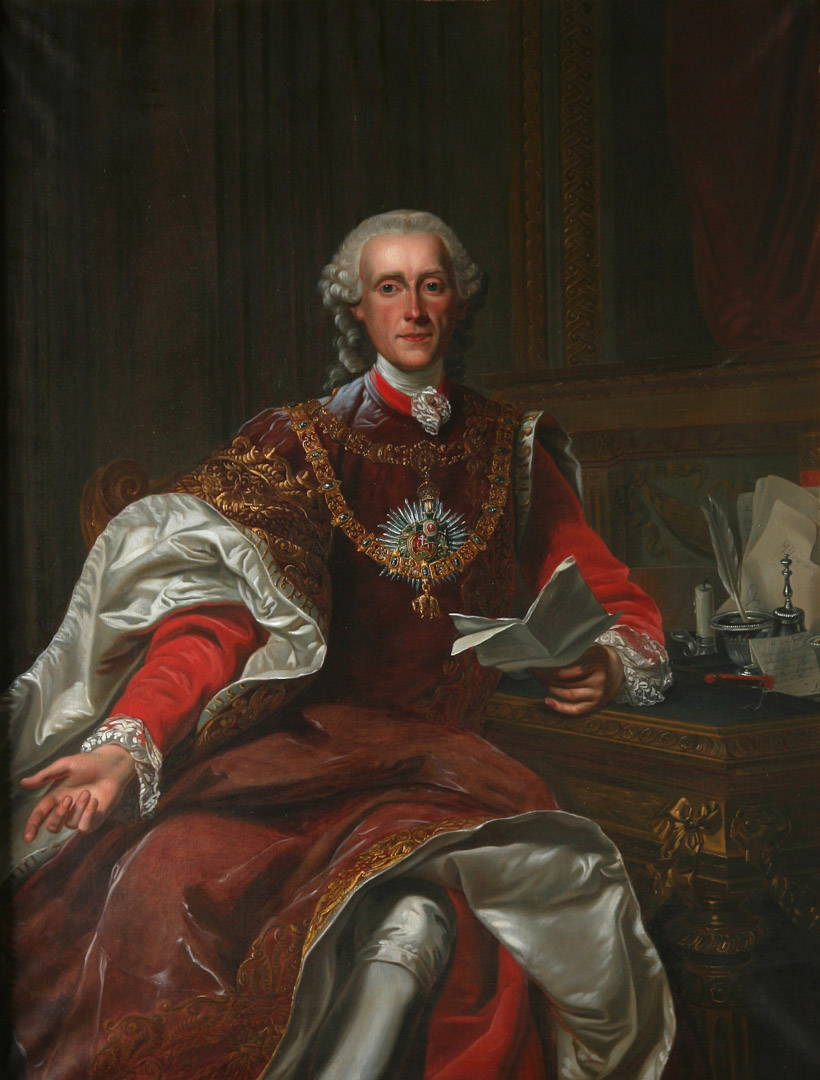
- Georg Adam von Starhemberg (1724–1807), Imperial ambassador
- Born: 24 August 1724; London, Great Britain
- Died: 19 April 1807 (aged 82); Vienna, Austrian Empire
- Occupation: Austrian diplomat

Johann Georg Adam Graf von Starhemberg, since 1765 Fürst von Starhemberg (prince of Starhemberg) (10 August 1724 in London – 19 April 1807 in Vienna) was an Austrian diplomat, minister, chief chamberlain and close confidant of Empress Maria Theresa.

== Life ==
Georg Adam was born in London as the fifth son to the Imperial envoy Konrad Sigmund, Graf von Starhemberg (1689–1727) and his wife Leopoldine, née Princess von Löwenstein-Wertheim-Rochefort (1689-1763). King George I became his godfather. He had two notable great-uncles. Gundaker Thomas von Starhemberg (1663–1745), a financial expert at the court in Vienna who played a key role in the education of Georg Adam and Count Ernst Rüdiger von Starhemberg (1638–1701), the military governor of Vienna and leading figure in the Battle of Vienna and the subsequent Great Turkish War from 1683 to 1699.

In 1727, when Georg Adam was three years of age, he experienced the loss of his father who died at the age of just 38 years. Georg Adam received his education in Vienna conducted under the auspices of his mother and his great-uncle, Austrian minister of finance Gundaker Thomas von Starhemberg. Subsequently, he did his Grand Tour; in the company of a mentor he visited a number of capitals and courts in Europe.

In 1742, at the age of 18, Count Georg Adam von Starhemberg joined Austrian civil service. In 1748, he was appointed 'Aulic Councillor of the Empire' (Reichshofrat) and became chamberlain (Kammerherr) of Archduke Joseph, the eldest son of Empress Maria Theresa.

The following years he travelled as an envoy to Lisbon, Trieste, Madrid and Paris where he met Wenzel Anton, Prince of Kaunitz. Kaunitz was married to Countess Maria Ernestine von Starhemberg (1717–1749), a granddaughter of Georg Adam's great-uncle and educator Gundaker Thomas Graf von Starhemberg. In 1754 Count Georg Adam was sent to Paris as Imperial envoy and stayed there for the next twelve years. Along with Kaunitz he paved the way for a rapprochement between the Habsburgian rulers and France after a long-standing history of conflict. He tried to influence the French king primarily by Louis' chief mistress, the Marquise de Pompadour. The first meeting between the Austrian envoy and the marquise for this purpose took place on 30 August 1755. In 1756 the Treaty of Versailles was concluded with his participation. In Paris, Starhemberg also successfully negotiated the marriage between the Habsburg Archduchess Maria Antonia and the Duke of Berry, the future king Louis XVI. In 1770 he accompanied the archduchess to the first encounter with her future husband.

The same year he was sent to Brussels as authorised minister (minister plenipotentiary) in the Austrian Netherlands, since his predecessor Count Karl von Cobenzl had died in January of that year. One of the reasons that influenced the decision to send Starhemberg to Brussels was that Joseph II who had become co-ruler in 1765 had been disappointed by Starhemberg and now wanted to remove him from the vicinity of his mother, Empress Maria Theresa, in Vienna. Starhemberg remained the next 13 years in Brussels where he successfully stimulated the development of the provinces in the Austrian Netherlands in spite of the fact that Joseph had limited his powers. During the American War of Independence Starhemberg tried to establish trade contacts with the emerging young nation.

Georg Adam, Prince of Starhemberg also managed to found the first academy of the Austrian Netherlands in Brussels in 1772 by converting Count Karl von Cobenzl's 'Literary Society' into the 'Imperial and Royal Academy of Science and Letters' of Brussels with the approval of the Empress Maria Theresa.

Starhemberg returned to Vienna in 1783.

Count Belgiojoso became his successor in Brussels as authorised minister in the Austrian Netherlands.

From 1783 until 1807 Starhemberg occupied the position as Grand Master of the Household (Obersthofmeister) at the Imperial court in Vienna. However, his duties in this function had a more representative character without significant political influence except the period after the death of Joseph II from 1790 until 1797. In 1807 Starhemberg died at the age of 83.

== Marriage and family ==
On 13 November 1747 he firstly married his cousin, Countess Maria Theresia Esther von Starhemberg (1731-1749), daughter of Count Ottokar Franz Jacob von Starhemberg (1681-1733) and Countess Maria Christine von Trautson-Falkenstein (1702-1743). She died however in October 1749 leaving behind a daughter Maria Leopodine who died in childhood in Paris in 1756.

In 1761 he married his second wife Princess Maria Franziska Josefa von Salm-Salm (1731-1806), daughter of Prince Nikolus Leopold vonn Salm-Salm (1701-1770) and his first wife Princess Dorothea Franziska Agnes von Salm (1702-1751). In the following year Maria Franziska gave birth to 2 sons:

- Ludwig, Prince of Starhemberg (1762–1833), his son and heir. Louis XV became godfather of this child.
- Franz Josef (1767-1771), died in childhood.

== Distinctions ==
He was decorated with the title 'Ambassador to the Emperor' for his diplomatic achievements in the relationship with France.

In 1759 he became Knight in the Order of the Golden Fleece.

In 1765 Count Starhemberg was elevated from 'Graf' to 'Reichsfürst' (Prince of the Empire). From then on he held the title 'Fürst von Starhemberg' (Prince of Starhemberg).

In 1767 Prince of Starhemberg was awarded the Grand Cross of the Order of St. Stephen.

== See also ==
- Starhemberg

== Literature ==
- A. Graf Thürheim (1889). Ludwig Fürst Starhemberg. Eine Lebensskizze. Verlagsbuchhandlung Styria, Graz
- Hanns Schlitter (1893). ADB: Starhemberg, Georg Adam Fürst von. In: Allgemeine Deutsche Biographie, herausgegeben von der Historischen Kommission bei der Bayerischen Akademie der Wissenschaften, Band 35, p. 471–473,
- Franz A. J. Szabo (1994). Kaunitz and Enlightened Absolutism 1753-1780. Cambridge University Press
- P. Lenders, « STARHEMBERG, Georg Adam von », in Nationaal Biografisch Woordenboek, deel II, Paleis der Academiën, Brussel, 1966, p. 806-814.

Preceded by Count Karl von Cobenzl	Authorized minister in the Austrian Netherlands (plenipotentiary); 1770–1783	Succeeded by Count Ludovico di Belgiojoso
