= Ludovico Barbiano di Belgiojoso (1728–1801) =

Austrian diplomat (1728-1801)

Ludovico Count of Belgiojoso Ludwig Karl Maria Graf von Belgiojoso
- Ludovico Luigi Carlo Maria di Barbiano di Belgiojoso
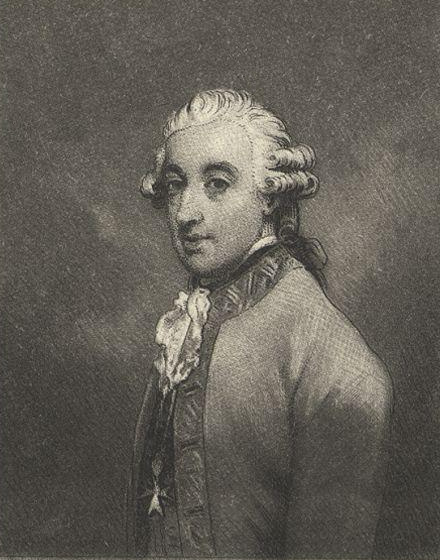

Authorized minister in the Austrian Netherlands (plenipotentiary of the Austrian Netherlands)
- In office 1783–1787
- Preceded by: Georg Adam, Prince of Starhemberg
- Succeeded by: Joseph, Count Murray (ad interim)

Personal details
- Born: 2 January 1728
- Died: 15 May 1801 (aged 73)

Ludovico Luigi Carlo Maria di Barbiano di Belgiojoso or Ludwig Karl Maria von Barbiano Graf von Belgiojoso (2 January 1728 – 15 May 1801, Milan) was an Austrian diplomat and Lieutenant Field Marshal who served the Habsburg monarchy in the second half of the 18th century.

== Life ==
Ludovico di Belgiojoso was born in Belgioioso as the second son of Count Don Antonio Barbiano di Belgioioso (1693–1779) and his wife Barbara Luigia Elisabetta D'Adda, contessa di Bronno (1707–1769). The medieval castle of Belgioioso, a town located just south of Milan, had been the seat of the Belgiojoso family for centuries. Belgioioso was part of the Duchy of Milan which itself formed a part of the Holy Roman Empire at that time.

Ludovico's father Count Antonio had served the Habsburg empress Maria Theresa throughout his career as Imperial ambassador and since 1748 as Imperial Personal Councillor. He was made a Knight in the Order of the Golden Fleece in 1763 and was elevated from Count (Graf) to 'Prince of the Empire and of Belgioioso' (Reichsfürst von Belgiojoso in German, Principe del Sacro Romano Impero e di Belgioioso in Italian) in Vienna on 5 August 1769. The elevation included the right to mint coins bearing the effigy of the prince.

His son Ludovico was created a Knight of Malta at the age of seven in 1735.

Following in the footsteps of his father Ludovico then started a successful career in the service of the Emperor becoming at first an Imperial Chamberlain. In 1757 he was appointed captain of the Imperial army. From 1764 until 1769 he served as Habsburg's ambassador to Sweden. Empress Maria Theresia was satisfied with his performance to such an extent that in 1769 she gave him the important position of the Emperor's special envoy and plenipotentiary at the Court of St James's in London. In the following years he also accompanied Maria Theresia's son Joseph on his journeys to a number of European courts and cities. On 3 May 1781, Belgiojoso was admitted a Fellow of the Royal Society. He stayed in London until 1782.

Count Belgiojoso was promoted 'Lieutenant Field Marshal of the Holy Roman Empire' on 26 April 1783.

On 9 May of that year emperor Joseph II appointed him 'authorised minister in the Austrian Netherlands' (plenipotentiary of the Austrian Netherlands) and sent him to Brussels in succession of Georg Adam, Prince of Starhemberg. Belgiojoso arrived in Brussels on 3 June 1783 and assumed his duties a few days later. He remained as authorised minister in Brussels the next four years until 1787. In this period emperor Joseph II tried to introduce a number of reforms, especially in the field of education, which caused a lot of resistance. When Joseph replaced the central organs of government (most notably the Collateral Councils) with a single General Council of Government, and abolished the Council of Brabant, replacing it with a supreme court, he provoked widespread rioting and a rising in Brussels known as the "Small Revolution" in May 1787. The government in Brussels tried to calm down the unrests by suspending the edicts from January 1787 which caused the troubles. This prompted a furious reaction from the emperor. With order from 24 June 1787 Count Belgiojoso, his authorised minister in the Austrian Netherlands, and the Duke of Teschen, his governor-general, were both recalled to Vienna. They left Brussels between 19 and 20 July. Both were replaced ad interim with Joseph Count Murray de Melgum, commander-in-chief of the Austrian army in the Austrian Netherlands. Following an invitation of the emperor, a delegation of the Provincial States of Brabant travelled to Vienna to meet the Emperor. Although Joseph felt a bit satisfied by this gesture, the disputed issues remained unsolved and both sides left frustrated. In an attempt to soothe the tensions Count Murray again suspended in September 1787 the edicts from January. As a result, he was also removed from his post as commander-in-chief and replaced with Count Richard d'Alton. As future 'authorised minister in the Austrian Netherlands' the emperor however appointed Ferdinand von Trauttmansdorff.

Count Belgiojoso's political career was finished and he returned later on to Milan. Between 1790 and 1796, along with architect Leopold Pollack, Belgiojoso redesigned the family residence, now known as Royal Villa of Milan.

On 15 May 1801 Ludovico Count of Belgiojoso died in Milan.

== Literature ==
- Joseph II., in deutsche-biographie.de (in German)
- Trauttmansdorff, Ferdinand Fürst zu, in deutsche-biographie.de (in German)
- F. Calvi (1878), Curiosità storiche e diplomatiche del secolo decimo-ottavo, Milano (section: Letterre dell’ Imperatore Giuseppe II, al Tenente-Maresciallo Conte Lodovico Antonio Belgiojoso-Este, 1774–87) (in Italian)
- Ottokar Lorenz (1862), Joseph II. und die belgische Revolution, Wien (in German)
- Bright, James Franck (1923), Joseph II, Macmillan and Company.
- Renate Zedinger (2000), Die Verwaltung der Österreichischen Niederlande in Wien (1714–1795), Böhlau Verlag Wien (in German)
- Derek Edward Dawson Beales (2009), Joseph II: Volume 2, Against the World, 1780–1790, Cambridge University Press

== Notes ==
Preceded by Georg Adam, Prince of Starhemberg	Authorized minister in the Austrian Netherlands (plenipotentiary); 1783–1787	Succeeded by Joseph Jacob, Count Murray (ad interim)
