= Robert Murray (died 1719) =

Scottish soldier

Robert Murray (died 1719) was a Scottish soldier.

He was a younger son of Sir Robert Murray, Lord Provost of Edinburgh. His elder brother, Alexander Murray of Melgund, was the father of Sir Alexander Murray, 1st Baronet.

On 8 January 1681 Murray was commissioned as captain-lieutenant of the Earl of Linlithgow's company in that nobleman's regiment of Foot Guards, now the Scots Guards. He was promoted to captain on 13 September 1687 and major and lieutenant-colonel on 1 September 1691. He was granted brevet rank as colonel on 1 June 1693 and made lieutenant-colonel of the Scots Foot Guards on 13 November 1695. He was present at the Battle of Landen in 1693 and the Siege of Namur in 1695.

On 30 May 1697 Murray was appointed colonel of a Scots regiment in the Dutch States Army. He was made brigadier-general on 9 May 1702, major-general on 14 April 1704 and lieutenant-general on 1 January 1709. He served throughout the campaigns of the Duke of Marlborough, and at the time of his death was Governor of Tournai.

Robert Murray's only surviving son by his wife Marguerite Therese Booninck was Sir Joseph Murray, 3rd Baronet, also a soldier, who was created a Count of the Holy Roman Empire in 1761.
