= Ferdinand von Trauttmansdorff =

Austrian diplomat and statesman

Prince Ferdinand von Trauttmansdorff
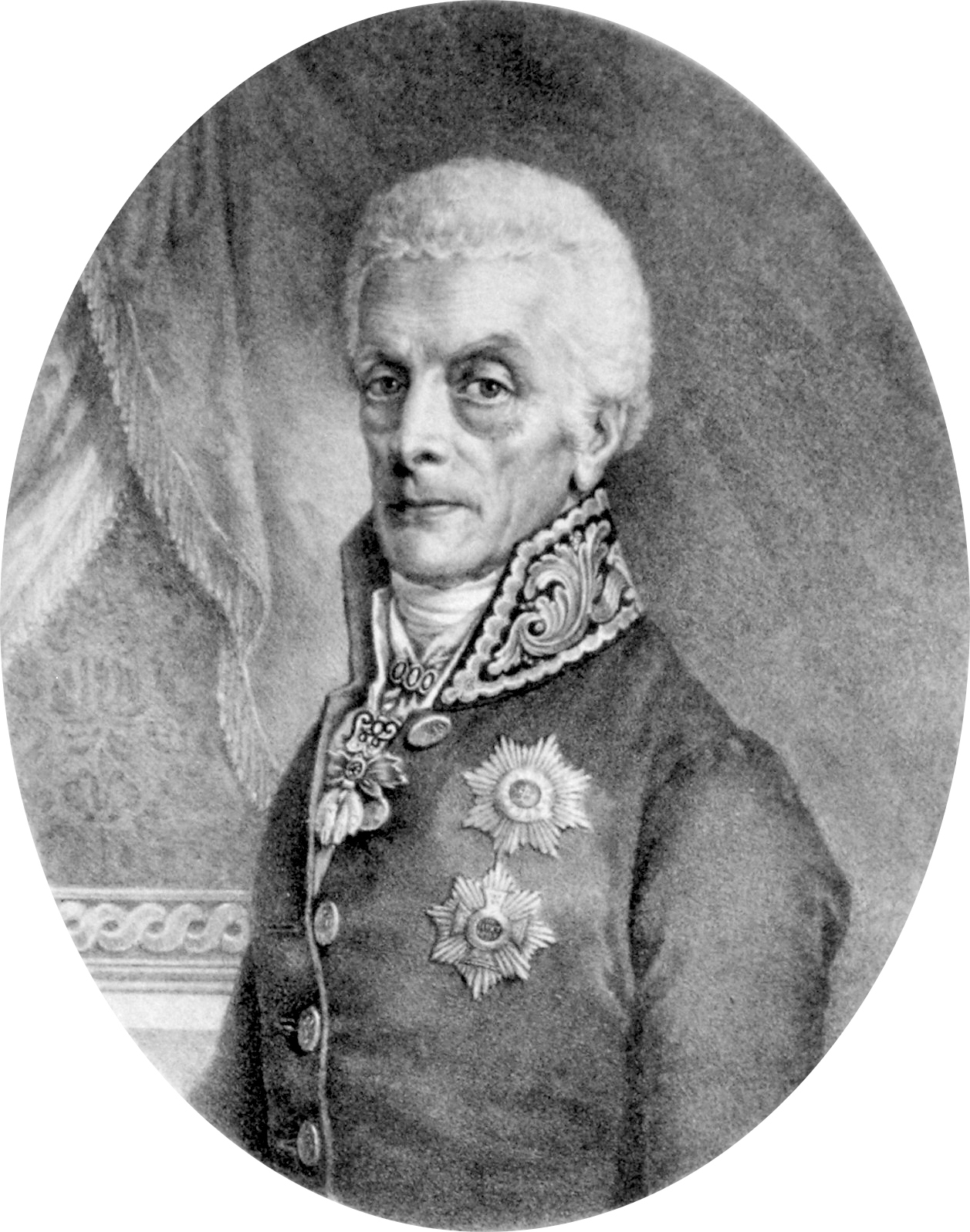
- Lithograph portrait by Friedrich Johann Gottlieb Lieder

Minister plenipotentiary of the Austrian Netherlands
- In office 1787–1789
- Monarch: Joseph II
- Preceded by: Count Joseph Murray (acting)
- Succeeded by: Philipp von Cobenzl

Personal details
- Born: 12 January 1749 Vienna
- Died: 27 August 1827 (aged 78) Vienna
- Spouse: Marie Caroline von Colloredo
- Education: University of Vienna

Prince Ferdinand von Trauttmansdorff-Weinsberg (1749–1827) was an Austrian diplomat and statesman. From 1787 to 1789 he was Minister plenipotentiary of the Austrian Netherlands, ruling on behalf of Emperor Joseph II.

== Early life ==
Ferdinand was born in Vienna on 12 January 1749, into the House of Trauttmansdorff, one of the most prominent houses of the Austrian nobility. He was the son of Count Franz Norbert von Trauttmansdorff (1705-1786) by his second wife, Countess Maria Anna von Herberstein (1723-1815). He had one full sister, Countess Maria Antonie von Trauttmansdorff-Weinsberg (1746-1817), who died unmarried. His half-siblings with his father's first wife Countess Florence Josèphe de Gavre (1708-1742) included Countess Maria Theresia von Lamberg (1727-1755), Countess Maria Anna von Trauttmansdorff (1736-1788), Count Josef Wenzel von Trauttmansdorff (1739-1769) and Countess Maria Amalie Kinsky von Wchinitz und Tettau (1741-1808).

== Life ==
He studied at the University of Vienna and served in the Reichskammergericht in Wetzlar. At his brother's death in 1774, he became the Head of the family. He was made a Knight of the Austrian Order of the Golden Fleece in 1789.

== Austrian Netherlands ==
In 1780, he was appointed Austrian minister in Regensburg, and in 1785 imperial ambassador to the Archbishop-Elector of Mainz. In 1787, he was appointed the emperor's minister plenipotentiary in the Austrian Netherlands, effectively head of the government.

He arrived in Brussels in October 1787. His brief was to push through the innovations that Joseph II had determined on and that the previous minister plenipotentiary, Ludovico, Count of Belgioioso, had been forced to dial back. In his zeal to execute imperial policy, Trauttmansdorff carried out a government coup on 18 June 1789, rescinding the ancient privileges of the county of Hainaut, decreeing the abolition of the Council of Brabant, and arbitrarily imprisoning many of the opponents of government policy. His dictatorial behaviour precipitated the Brabant Revolution. Count Richard d'Alton (1732-1790), General Commander of Imperial Forces in Austrian Netherlands was against such drastic reforms and advised against them. In November, he began to offer concessions and recognise ancient liberties, but too late to stem revolutionary rejection of Austrian authority. On 14 December 1789, Trauttmansdorff fled Brussels for Luxembourg. His secret correspondence with Joseph II while minister plenipotentiary was published in 1902.

He re-entered imperial service in 1793, being appointed to the Chancery for the Netherlands in Vienna. He accompanied the Emperor Francis II to Brussels for his reception as ruler during the short-lived Austrian restoration of 1793–1794.

== Prince of the Holy Roman Empire ==
In 1805 for his diplomatic service, he received the title of Prince of the Holy Roman Empire and thus became Prince of Trauttmansdorff-Weinsberg. The title of Fürst was inheritable only by the Head of the family, while all other legitimate male line descendants were Count/Countess von Trauttmansdorff-Weinsberg.
From August 1807 until his death in 1827 he served as Obersthofmeister to Emperor Franz. In this capacity he was responsible for organizing the Congress of Vienna in 1814/15.

== Personal life ==
On 18 May 1772 he married in Vienna Countess Maria Karoline von Colloredo-Waldsee (1752-1832), daughter of Prince Rudolph Joseph von Colloredo-Wallsee (1706–1788) and his wife, Countess Marie Gabriele von Starhemberg (1707–1793). They had 10 children, 5 of whom reached adulthood and had further issue.

== Death ==
On 27 Aug 1827 he died in Vienna.

== Works ==
- Fragments pour servir à l'histoire des évenements qui se sont passés aux Pays-Bas depuis la fin de 1787 jusqu'en 1789 (Amsterdam, 1790).

Preceded by Count Joseph Murray	Authorized minister in the Austrian Netherlands; 1787–1789	Succeeded by Philipp von Cobenzl
