= List of ministers plenipotentiary of the Austrian Netherlands =

In the eighteenth century, it became the norm for the Archduke of Austria, who was lord of the Netherlands by inheritance, to appoint a diplomat with the rank of minister plenipotentiary to represent his interests at the court of the governor-general of the Netherlands in Brussels. The minister plenipotentiary served as an intermediary between the courts of Vienna and Brussels and as a check on the development of any independent policy in the latter. The post of governor was gradually reduced to a primarily ceremonial function—especially during the tenure of the first Cobenzl—and the minister plenipotentiary became the de facto supreme authority in the Netherlands.

- 1716 Lothar Joseph Dominik Graf von Königsegg-Rothenfels
- 1716–1724 Hercule-Louis Turinetti
- 1725 Wirich Philipp von Daun (ad interim)
- 1726–1732 Giulio Visconti Borromeo Arese
- 1732–1741 Friedrich August von Harrach-Rohrau (Note: Officially "Great Master of the Court" and then governor-general ad interim from 1741 until 1744.)
- 1743–1744 Karl Ferdinand von Königsegg-Erps
- 1744–1746 Wenzel Anton von Kaunitz-Rietberg
- 1748–1749 Károly Batthyány
- 1749–1753 Antoniotto Botta Adorno
- 1753–1770 Johann Karl Philipp von Cobenzl
- 1770–1783 Georg Adam von Starhemberg
- 1783–1787 Ludovico di Belgiojoso
- 1787 Joseph Jacob Murray (ad interim)
- 1787–1789 Ferdinand von Trauttmansdorff
- 1789–1790 Philipp von Cobenzl
- 1790–1791 Florimond de Mercy-Argenteau
- 1791–1794 Franz Georg Karl von Metternich (Note: The Austrian Netherlands were under French occupation in 1792-93.)

== Sources ==
- Janssens, P. (2006) [1999]. "The Spanish and Austrian Netherlands, 1579–1780". In Blom, J. C. H.; Lamberts, E. (eds.). History of the Low Countries. Berghahn Books. pp. 221–74.
