= Sir David Dalrymple, 1st Baronet =

Scottish advocate and politician (1665–1721)

The Right Honourable Sir David Dalrymple Bt

Member of Parliament for Haddington
- In office 1708–1721
- Preceded by: New Creation
- Succeeded by: Sir James Dalrymple, Bt

Member of Parliament for Scotland
- In office 1707–1708
- Preceded by: Parliament of Scotland
- Succeeded by: Constituency split

Burgh Commissioner for Culross
- In office 1698–1707
- Preceded by: William Erskine
- Succeeded by: Parliament of Great Britain

Personal details
- Born: 1665
- Died: 3 December 1721 (aged 55–56)
- Parent(s): James Dalrymple, 1st Viscount of Stair; Margaret Ross
- Education: University of Edinburgh; University of Utrecht

Sir David Dalrymple, 1st Baronet, of Hailes (1665 – 3 December 1721) was a Scottish advocate and politician who sat in the Parliament of Scotland from 1698 to 1707 and in the British House of Commons from 1707 to 1721. He served as Lord Advocate, and eventually Auditor of the Exchequer in Scotland in 1720.

== Early life ==
Dalrymple was the fifth and youngest son of James Dalrymple, 1st Viscount of Stair and his wife Margaret Ross, daughter of James Ross of Balneil, Wigtown.

He was educated at the University of Edinburgh and was awarded MA in 1681, and then studied at the University of Utrecht in 1682. He was admitted a member of the Faculty of Advocates on 3 November 1688.

== Career ==
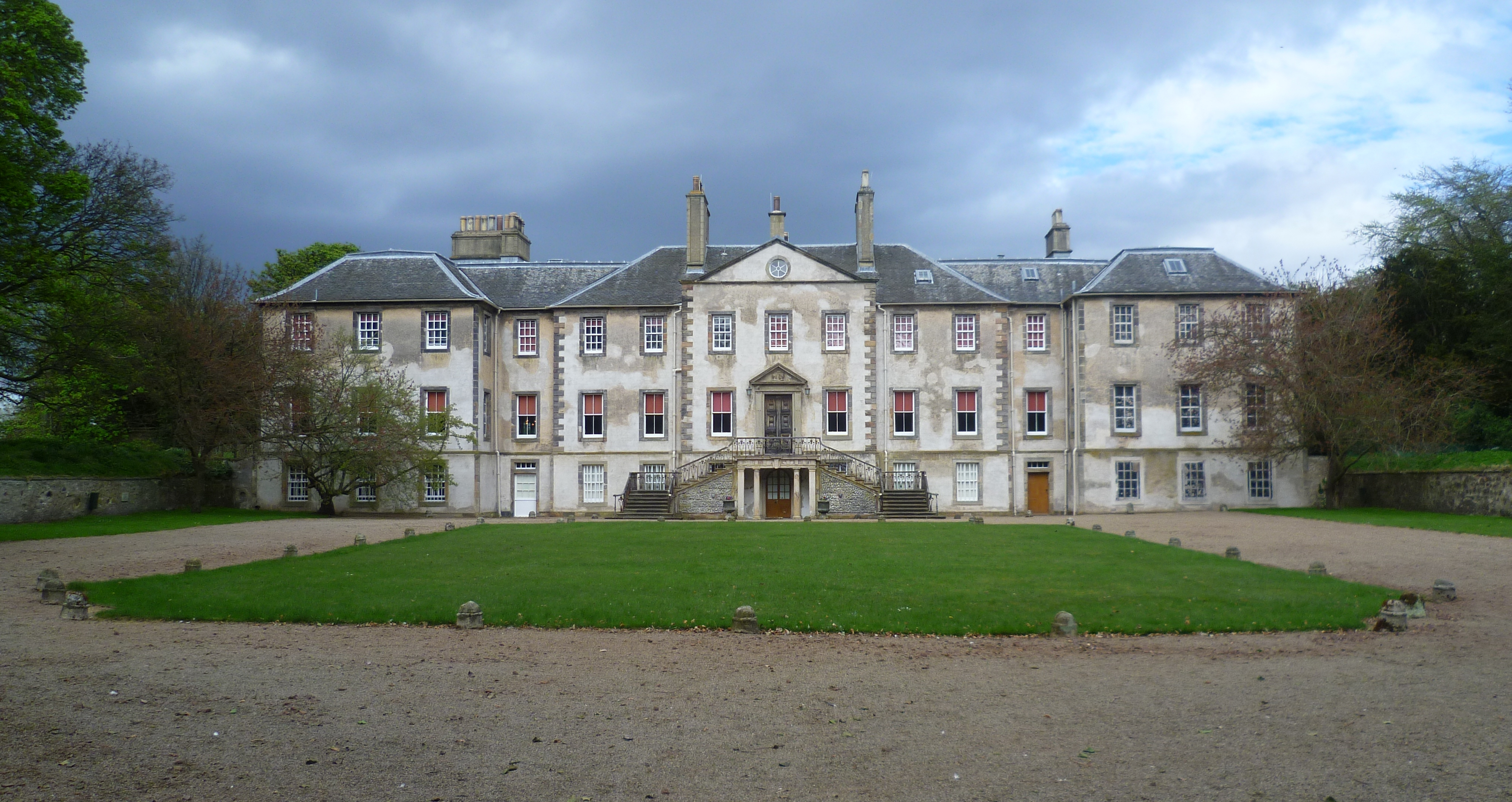
Dalrymple's home at Newhailes, near Musselburgh

Dalrymple was elected to represent Culross in 1698 in the Parliament of Scotland, as a member of the Stair–Queensberry alliance. He was created baronet on 8 May 1701 and was also appointed joint solicitor-general for Scotland and auditor of treasury of Scotland in 1701. He was a Commissioner for the union with England in 1702, and again in 1706 when he was one of the Commissioners who negotiated the Act of Union 1707.

In 1707 Dalrymple was one of the Scottish representatives to the first Parliament of Great Britain and at the 1708 British general election, he was returned as Member of Parliament for Haddington. In 1709 he was promoted from solicitor-general to the post of Lord Advocate of Scotland .Also in 1709, he bought Broughton House, renaming it Newhailes after the Dalrymple's Castle Hailes. He was returned again for Haddington at the 1710 British general election. In 1711 he lost the post of Lord Advocate under the Tory administration. In 1712, he was elected Dean of the Faculty of Advocates which he held for the rest of his life. He was returned again at the 1713 British general election and regained his post as Lord Advocate in 1714.

Dalrymple was returned as MP for Haddington at the 1715 British general election. He was Commissioner of visitation for Glasgow University in 1717 and 1718, and for St Andrews University in 1718. He was appointed auditor general of the Scottish Exchequer in 1720.

== Personal life ==
Sir David Dalrymple married first Elizabeth ? (1660-1685) around 1680 in Drummerchut, Ayrshire, Scotland. By his first wife he had sons Andrew and David (pos. died during childbirth). On 4 April 1691 in Edinburgh, Midlothian, Scotland, he married his second wife, Janet, daughter of Sir James Rocheid of Inverleith, the widow of Alexander Murray of Melgund. By his second wife he had two sons, James (1692-1751) & Hugh (1695-1741), and four daughters, Magdalin (1696-), Janet (1698-1766), Margaret (1705-1705) and Rachel ( -1801):

- Andrew Dalrymple (1684–1762), who emigrated to Massachusetts Bay Colony; he married Dorothy Shepherd.
- Sir James Dalrymple, 2nd Baronet (1692–1751), of Hailes, East Lothian.
- Hugh Dalrymple (1695–1741), who married Isobel Sommerville and later took the surname Dalrymple-Murray-Kynnynmond.
- Janet Dalrymple (1698–1776), who married Sir John Baird, 2nd Baronet of Newbyth, MP for Edinburghshire. After his death, she married Gen. James St Clair of Dysart, MP.

Dalrymple died on 3 December 1721. He was succeeded in his baronetcy by his son, James, as his eldest son, Andrew, emigrated to the Massachusetts Bay Colony around 1711, giving up his right to the family title.

=== Descendants ===
Through his son Hugh, he was a grandfather of Agnes Dalrymple-Murray-Kynynmound, who married Sir Gilbert Elliot, 3rd Baronet, of Minto.

=== Legacy ===
Dalrymple was an enthusiastic bibliophile and added a remarkable Library Wing to Newhailes to accommodate his large book collection. This extension to the building was completed in around 1722.

Parliament of Scotland
Preceded by William Erskine	Burgh Commissioner for Culross; 1698–1707	Succeeded by Parliament of Great Britain
Parliament of Great Britain
New parliament	Member of Parliament for Scotland; 1707–1708	Constituency split
New constituency	Member of Parliament for Haddington; 1708–1721	Succeeded by Sir James Dalrymple, Bt
Baronetage of Nova Scotia
New creation	Baronet (of Hailes); 1701–1721	Succeeded by James Dalrymple
