= Inverleith =

Suburb of Edinburgh, Scotland

Coordinates: 55°58′0″N 3°12′50″W

Inverleith: Scottish Gaelic: Inbhir Lìte
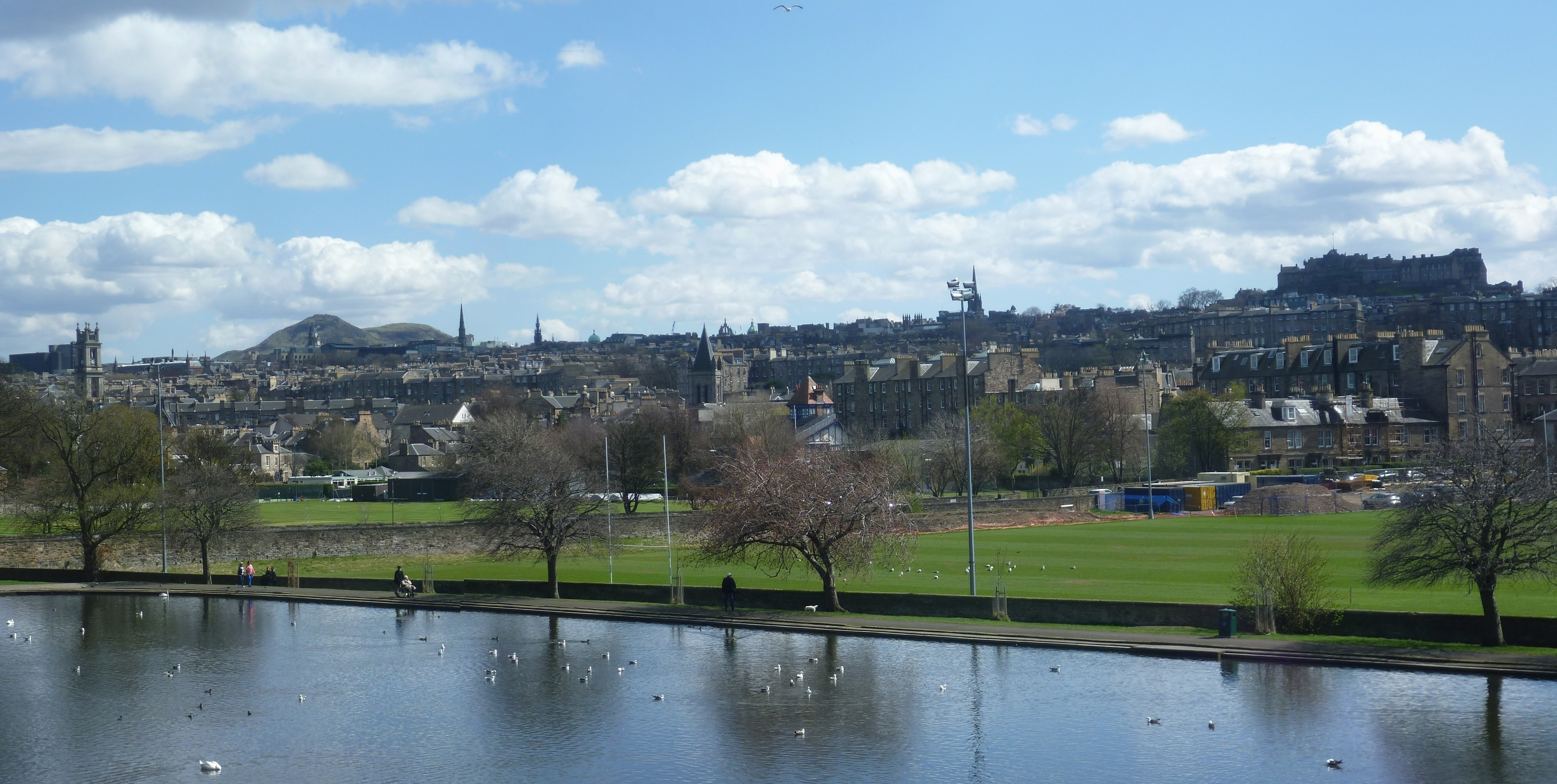
- Edinburgh from Inverleith Park

- Location within the City of Edinburgh council area Location within Scotland
- OS grid reference: NT244754
- Council area: City of Edinburgh
- Country: Scotland
- Sovereign state: United Kingdom
- Post town: Edinburgh
- Postcode district: EH3
- Dialling code: 0131
- Police: Scotland
- Fire: Scottish
- Ambulance: Scottish
- UK Parliament: Edinburgh North and Leith
- Scottish Parliament: Edinburgh Northern

Inverleith (Scottish Gaelic: Inbhir Lìte) is an inner suburb in the north of Edinburgh, Scotland, on the fringes of the central region of the city. Its neighbours include Trinity to the north and the New Town to the south, with Canonmills at the south-east and Stockbridge at the south-west.

Like many places in and around Lothian and Edinburgh, the name comes from Scottish Gaelic – Inbhir Lìte, meaning "Mouth of Leith", as with Inverness, meaning mouth of the River Ness. Some documents refer to the area as "Inner Leith".

It is characterised by its wealth of open green space. The Royal Botanic Garden Edinburgh and Inverleith Park, in addition to the numerous playing fields owned and used by the independent schools Edinburgh Academy, Fettes College, Stewart's Melville College and George Heriot's. The Royal Botanic Gardens' nursery garden, for growing and cultivating plants, is also located here. Within Inverleith there are very few shops and offices, and it is almost entirely residential and recreational in character.

Today Inverleith is home to houses often being sold considerably in excess of one million pounds sterling. These include Scotland's most expensive penthouses, selling for £1.5m, and a recently renovated villa, which sold for over two million pounds sterling. The houses are generally handsome and spacious Victorian or Georgian villas with two or three floors, garages and quite large gardens. The residents tend to be employed in professions in central Edinburgh. It is convenient for such workers, as it lies only a mile and a half from the centre. Being on grounds slightly higher than the centre, it commands views of the Edinburgh skyline, including Edinburgh Castle and Arthur's Seat. It has one of the lowest crime rates in the city and is a designated conservation area.

Within the area are Fettes College, an independent boarding school, and the state-run Broughton High School. Edinburgh Academy, an independent day school, is nearby in the north of the New Town.

The area gives its name to the Inverleith ward under the City of Edinburgh Council created in 2007, but this encompasses a larger territory including Stockbridge, Comely Bank and more westerly neighbourhoods such as Blackhall, Craigleith and Drylaw.

== Early proprietors ==
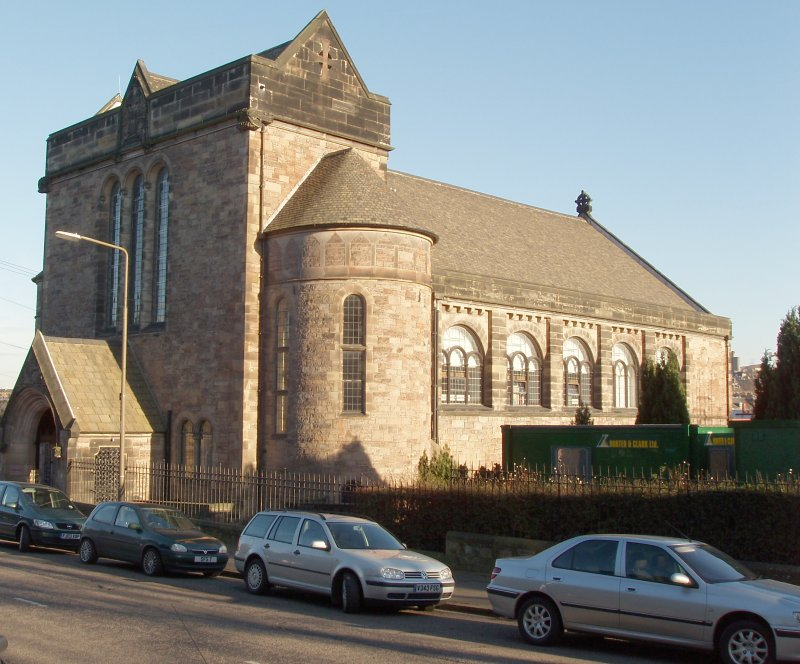
Union House, on Inverleith Terrace, was built as a Christian Science church in 1911, but is now offices

Inverleith was for over two centuries owned by the Rocheid (sometimes spelt Rochead) family. It changed hands when a co-heiress, Mary (d. 1749) married Sir Francis Kinloch, 3rd Baronet, of Gilmerton (1676–1747). Their son Alexander (d. 1755) inherited the entire Inverleith estates, and changed his surname to become Alexander Rocheid of Inverleith. Alexander and his descendants spent most of their time in Germany, and the Inverleith estate was leased. In 1774, Inverleith House was built, to designs by the architect David Henderson. Alexander's son James Rocheid of Inverleith leased Inverleith Mains at the beginning of the 19th century to George Lauder (1776–1824), Comptroller of the City of Edinburgh's Tolls, and the great-grandfather of Sir Harry Lauder.

== Parks and gardens ==
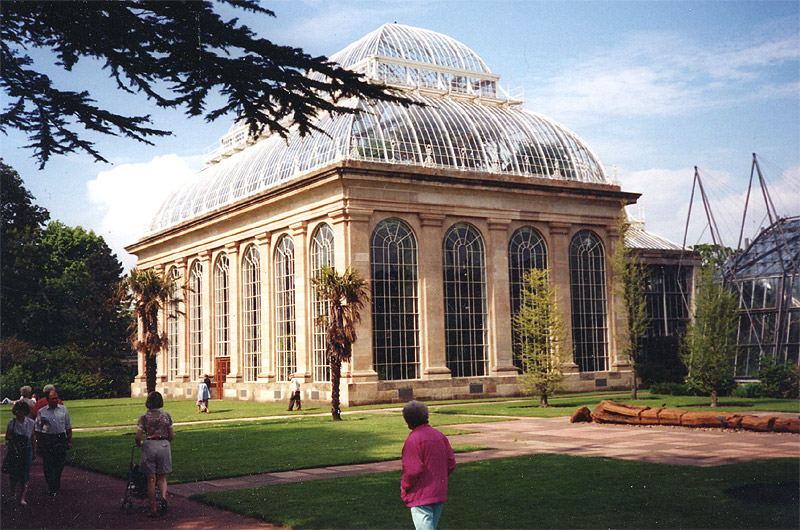
The Palm House in the Royal Botanic Gardens

In late 1823, George Lauder, described as the tenant farmer of Inverleith Mains, agreed with James Rocheid of Inverleith to a reversion of part of his leasehold lands, 11.5 Scots acres, for the site of the Royal Botanic Garden, which had formerly been located on Leith Walk. Commonly known as "The Botanics", the new site was opened in May 1824, comprising a large and varied set of gardens or parks with a wide range of plants, from around the world, in the open and in greenhouses. There is a Chinese-themed garden, an extensive landscaped rock garden, a large palm house, and since its opening in July 2006, an official memorial of Queen Elizabeth The Queen Mother, opened by Queen Elizabeth. It is maintained as a very popular tourist attraction, local leisure amenity, and scientific research centre.

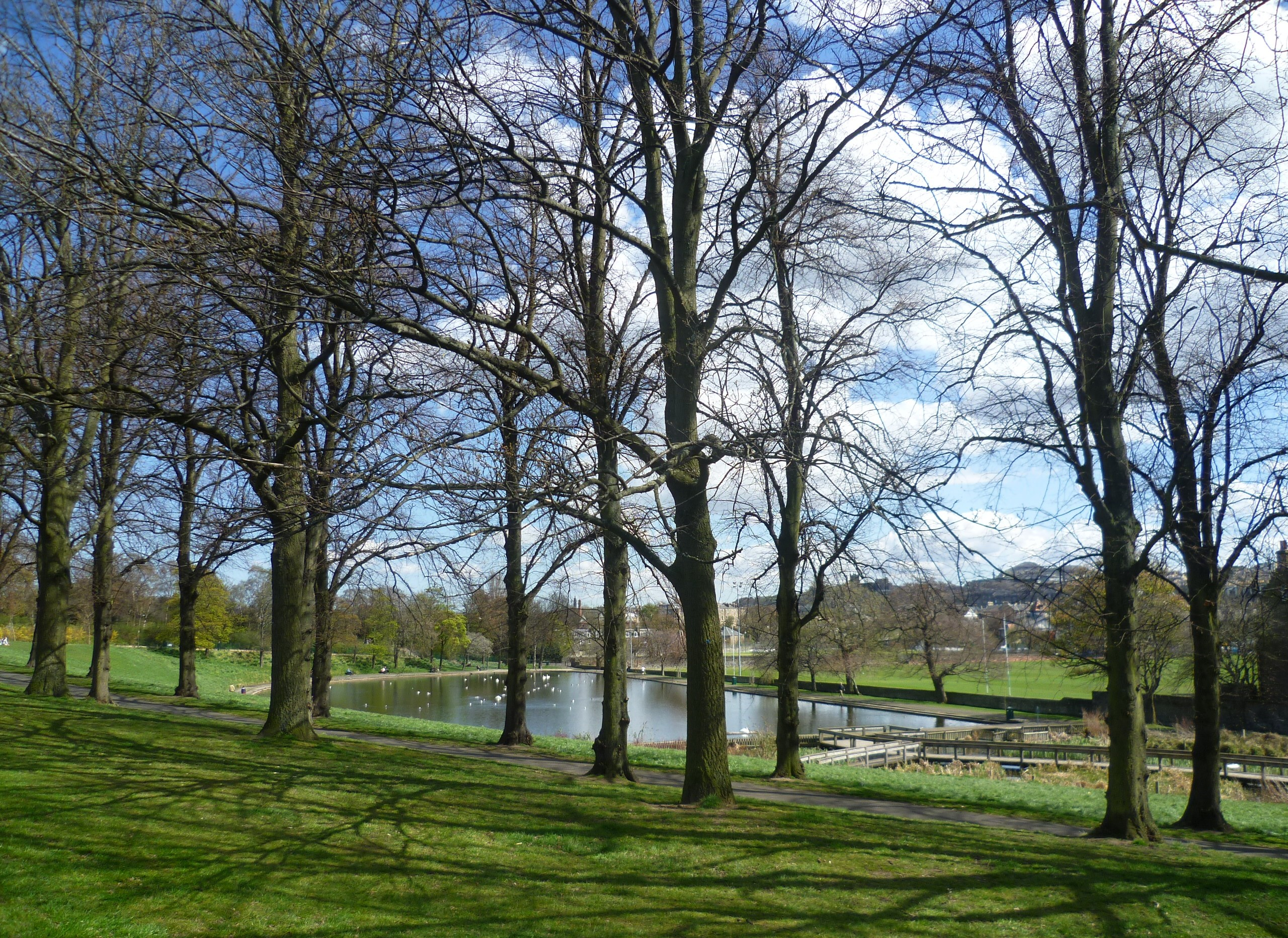
Inverleith Park

In 1889 the city acquired South Inverleith Mains Farm from the Rocheid family to create Inverleith Park, adjacent to the Royal Botanic Gardens. This includes allotments and a well maintained pond, popular for use by model boat enthusiasts and well populated with water birds and occasionally kingfishers. The park also the site of French boule (pétanque) competitions. Cricket, rugby union and football matches are played there as well. There are also tennis and volleyball courts maintained by Edinburgh Council and a safe play area for toddlers.

The park has hosted the Edinburgh International Science Festival, and is also used as a viewing area for fireworks set off over central Edinburgh. Inverleith Park also plays host to an annual Foodies Festival.

In early 2018, the Kinloch Anderson Sundial that was originally gifted to the City of Edinburgh in 1890, was restored as the result of an approach from the Friends of Inverleith Park to Kinloch Anderson. The company restored the sundial to mark its 150th anniversary.

The park has also played host as a shooting location for feature films such as Chariots of Fire and Dark Sense.

== Sport ==
A former home of the Scotland national rugby union team, the Inverleith Sports Ground (hosting international matches from 1899 until 1925 when they moved to Murrayfield Stadium) is located off Ferry Road and is today used by Stewarts Melville RFC.

In addition to some public facilities in Inverleith Park itself, the wider area contains a large expanse of separate but almost contiguous sports grounds, most of which are associated to local, historic fee-paying schools like the Edinburgh Academy, Fettes College and Stewart's Melville College (plus those of modern Broughton High School), including the home grounds of Edinburgh Accies (at Raeburn Place), Edinburgh Northern RFC and Inverleith RFC, as well as The Grange Club, home of the Scotland national cricket team.

== Notable residents ==
- James Black, clergyman
- William Bryson FRSE, electrical engineer
- William Charles, trader
- Daniel Ellis, botanist
- Cosmo Innes, lawyer and historian
- Sir Thomas Innes of Learney, Lord Lyon
- Horatio McCulloch, artist
- Moray McLaren and his wife Lennox Milne
- Alexander Martin, clergyman and academic
- Thomas Hugh Milroy, physicist and chemist
- James Pillans, scholar
- Robert Louis Stevenson, author
- Freya Mavor, actress and model

== Bibliography ==
- The Royal Botanic Garden Edinburgh, by Harold R Fletcher and William H Brown, HMSO, Edinburgh, 1970, ISBN 0-11-490425-1
