= Rochead baronets =

Dormant baronetcy in the Baronetage of Nova Scotia

The Rochead Baronetcy, of Inverleith in the County of Edinburgh, was a title in the Baronetage of Nova Scotia. It was created on 4 June 1704 for James Rochead. The title became dormant on the death of the second Baronet in 1743.

== Rochead baronets, of Inverleith (1704) ==
- Sir James Rochead, 1st Baronet (1667–1737)
- Sir John Rochead, 2nd Baronet (died 1743)
