= Sir Joseph Murray, 3rd Baronet =

Austrian soldier of Scottish descent (1718–1802)

Arms of Murray of Melgund: Argent, a hunting horn sable, stringed gides, in the dexter chief point a crescent of the last; on a chief wavy azure three mullets of the field.

Sir Joseph Murray, 3rd Baronet and 1st Count Murray (6 August 1718 – 5 June 1802) was a soldier of Scottish descent.

He was born at Tournai, the son of Robert Murray, a general in the Dutch States Army. He served as colonel of the Los Rios Regiment in the Austrian service, and as an Imperial chamberlain. For his courage at the Battle of Breslau in 1757 and the Battle of Hochkirch in 1758 he was made a Knight of the Order of Maria Theresa on 23 January 1760. On 16 September 1760 he was created a Baron of the Netherlands (Baron aux Pays Bas) and on 25 November 1761 the Emperor Francis I created him a Count of the Holy Roman Empire as Graf von Murray, with remainder to the heirs male of his body.

In March 1736 Joseph Murray had succeeded his cousin Sir Alexander Murray, 2nd Baronet in the baronetcy of Melgund in Forfarshire, though not in the estates. However, he did not assume the title until 28 March 1771, when he was served as heir-male.

Count Murray was commander-in-chief of the Austrian army in the Austrian Netherlands from 1781 to 1787, being created Count Murray de Melgum in the Austrian Netherlands on 19 March 1783. He also acted as plenipotentiary of the Austrian Netherlands ad interim from 19 July to 27 October 1787. He died at Vienna.

Count Murray left five daughters, one of whom, Christina Teresa, married James Ogilvy, 7th Earl of Findlater, and a son, Joseph Albert Murray (26 August 1774 – 6 February 1848), who succeeded as 4th Baronet and 2nd Count. He was a major-general in the Imperial Army, and died without male issue, when all his Imperial and Belgian honours became extinct and the baronetcy became dormant.

Diplomatic posts
Preceded by Count Ludovico di Belgiojoso	Authorized minister in the Austrian Netherlands (plenipotentiary ad interim); 1787–1787	Succeeded by Count Ferdinand von Trauttmansdorff
Baronetage of Nova Scotia
Preceded by Alexander Murray	Baronet (of Melgund); 1638–1802	Succeeded by Albert Murray
