= Murray baronets =

Baronetcy in the Baronetage of Nova Scotia

There have been several Murray Baronetcies, all created in the Baronetage of Nova Scotia. Four of these baronetcies are extant.

== Murray baronets, of Cockpool (19 July 1625 — 1658) ==
Arms of Murray of Cockpool: Azure, a crescent between three mullets within a double tressure flory-counter-flory argent; and for difference, granted by King James VI. A canton argent, charged with a thistle vert, crowned or.

- Sir Richard Murray, 1st Baronet (died 1636)
- John Murray, 1st Earl of Annandale (died 1640)
- James Murray, 2nd Earl of Annandale (died 1658) baronetcy dormant

== Murray baronets, of Clermont, Fife (1 July 1626 — c.1700) ==
Arms of Murray of Clermont: Or, a fetterlock azure within a bordure embattled gules; on a chief of the second three mullets argent. (this arms are doubtful, as the fetterlock and Motto belong to the Murrays of Blackbarony)

- Sir William Murray, 1st Baronet (died c. 1645)
- Sir Mungo Murray, 2nd Baronet (died c. 1670)
- Sir Mungo Murray, 3rd Baronet (died c. 1700) baronetcy dormant

== Murray baronets, of Blackbarony, Peebles (15 May 1628 — ) ==
Arms of Murray of Blackbarony: Or, a fetterlock azure; on a chief of the second three mullets argent.

- Sir Archibald Murray, 1st Baronet (died c. 1634)
- Sir Alexander Murray, 2nd Baronet (died c. 1668)
- Sir Archibald Murray, 3rd Baronet (died c. 1700)
- Sir Alexander Murray, 4th Baronet (died 31 December 1741)
- Sir William Murray, 5th Baronet (died c. 1760)
- Sir Richard Murray, 6th Baronet (died 4 October 1781)
- Sir Archibald Murray, 7th Baronet (c. 1726 – 23 June 1794)
- Sir John Murray, 8th Baronet (27 January 1766 – 30 August 1809)
- Sir Archibald Murray, 9th Baronet (3 August 1792 – 22 May 1860)
- Sir John Digby Murray, 10th Baronet (17 April 1798 – 8 May 1881)
- Sir Digby Murray, 11th Baronet (31 October 1829 – 5 January 1906)
- Sir John Digby Murray, 12th Baronet (12 January 1867 – 15 September 1938)
- Sir Kenelm Bold Murray, 13th Baronet (26 May 1898 – 16 August 1959)
- Sir Alan John Digby Murray, 14th Baronet (22 June 1909 – 9 May 1978)
- Sir Nigel Andrew Digby Murray, 15th Baronet (born 15 August 1944)

The heir apparent is the present holder's son Alexander Nigel Robert Murray (born 1981).

== Murray baronets, of Elibank, Selkirk (16 May 1628 — ) ==
- Sir Patrick Murray, 1st Baronet (died 1649) created Lord Elibank in 1643

For subsequent baronets, see Lord Elibank.

== Murray baronets, of Dunerne, Fife (20 April 1630 — ) ==
- Sir William Murray, 1st Baronet (died c. 1641)
- Sir William Murray, 2nd Baronet (died c. 1670)
- Sir William Murray, 3rd Baronet (died c. 1700)
- Sir William Murray, 4th Baronet (died c. 1730)
- Sir James Murray, 5th Baronet (died 14 February 1769)
- Sir Robert Murray, 6th Baronet (died 21 September 1771)
- Sir James Murray-Pulteney, 7th Baronet (c. 1755–26 Apr 1811)
- Sir John Murray, 8th Baronet (c. 1768 – 15 October 1827)
- Sir William Murray, 9th Baronet (c. 1769 – 14 May 1842)
- Sir James Pulteney Murray, 10th Baronet (c. 1814 – 20 February 1843)
- Sir Robert Murray, 11th Baronet (1 February 1815 – 15 April 1894)
- Sir William Robert Murray, 12th Baronet (19 October 1840 – 21 January 1904)
- Sir Edward Robert Murray, 13th Baronet (22 June 1875 – 14 January 1958)
- Rowland William Patrick Murray, presumed 14th Baronet (26 October 1910 – 1994)
- Rowland William Murray, presumed 15th Baronet (born 22 September 1947)

The heir apparent is the present holder's son Rowland William Murray (born 31 July 1979).

== Murray baronets, of Stanhope, Peebles (1664) ==
Arms of Murray of Stanhope: 1 and 4. Argent, a hunting horn sable, garnished gules; on a chief azure three mullets of the field. 2. Azure, three f raises argent. 3. Argent, on a chief gules three cushions or.

- Sir William Murray, 1st Baronet (died c. 1690)
- Sir David Murray, 2nd Baronet (died 14 February 1729)
- Sir Alexander Murray, 3rd Baronet (c. 1684 – 18 May 1743) MP for Peeblesshire 1710–1713
- Sir David Murray, 4th Baronet (died c. 1769) He was attainted and the baronetcy forfeited 1746

== Murray baronets, of Ochtertyre, Perth (1673) ==
Arms of Murray of Stanhope: Azure, three mullets argent; in the centre a cross of the second, surmounted by a saltire gules

- Sir William Murray, 1st Baronet (30 October 1615 – 18 February 1681)
- Sir Patrick Murray, 2nd Baronet (21 January 1656 – 25 December 1735)
- Sir William Murray, 3rd Baronet (22 February 1682 – 20 October 1739)
- Sir Patrick Murray, 4th Baronet (21 August 1707 – 9 September 1764)
- Sir William Murray, 5th Baronet (23 October 1746 – 6 December 1800)
- Sir Patrick Murray, 6th Baronet FRSE (3 February 1771 – 1 June 1837) MP for Edinburgh 1806–1812
- Sir William Keith-Murray, 7th Baronet (19 July 1801 – 16 October 1861)
- Sir Patrick Keith-Murray, 8th Baronet (27 January 1835 – 10 January 1921)
- Sir William Keith Murray, 9th Baronet (8 April 1872 – 4 February 1956)
- Sir Patrick Ian Keith Murray, 10th Baronet (28 August 1904 – 18 June 1962)
- Sir William Patrick Keith Murray, 11th Baronet (7 September 1939 – 2 November 1977)
- Sir Patrick Ian Keith Murray, 12th Baronet (born 22 March 1965)

== Murray baronets, of Melgund, Forfar (29 January 1704 — 6 February 1848) ==
Arms of Murray of Melgund: Argent, a hunting horn sable, stringed gides, in the dexter chief point a crescent of the last; on a chief wavy azure three mullets of the field.

- Sir Alexander Murray, 1st Baronet (2 August 1682 – 1713)
- Sir Alexander Murray, 2nd Baronet (c. 1708 – 11 March 1736)
- Sir Joseph Murray, 3rd Baronet (6 August 1718 – 8 June 1802)
- Sir Albert Joseph Ghislain Murray, 4th Baronet (26 August 1774 – 6 February 1848) baronetcy dormant
