= Lord Hailes =

Lord Hailes may refer to:

- David Dalrymple, Lord Hailes (1726–1792), Scottish advocate, judge and historian
- Patrick Buchan-Hepburn, 1st Baron Hailes (1901–1974), Scottish Conservative politician
- Patrick Hepburn, 1st Lord Hailes (d. 1483), Scottish Lord of Parliament
- Samuel Malin, Lord of Hailes (b. 1963), Canadian billionaire and noble Lord in the Baronage of Scotland
