= Newhailes House =

Architectural structure in East Lothian, Scotland

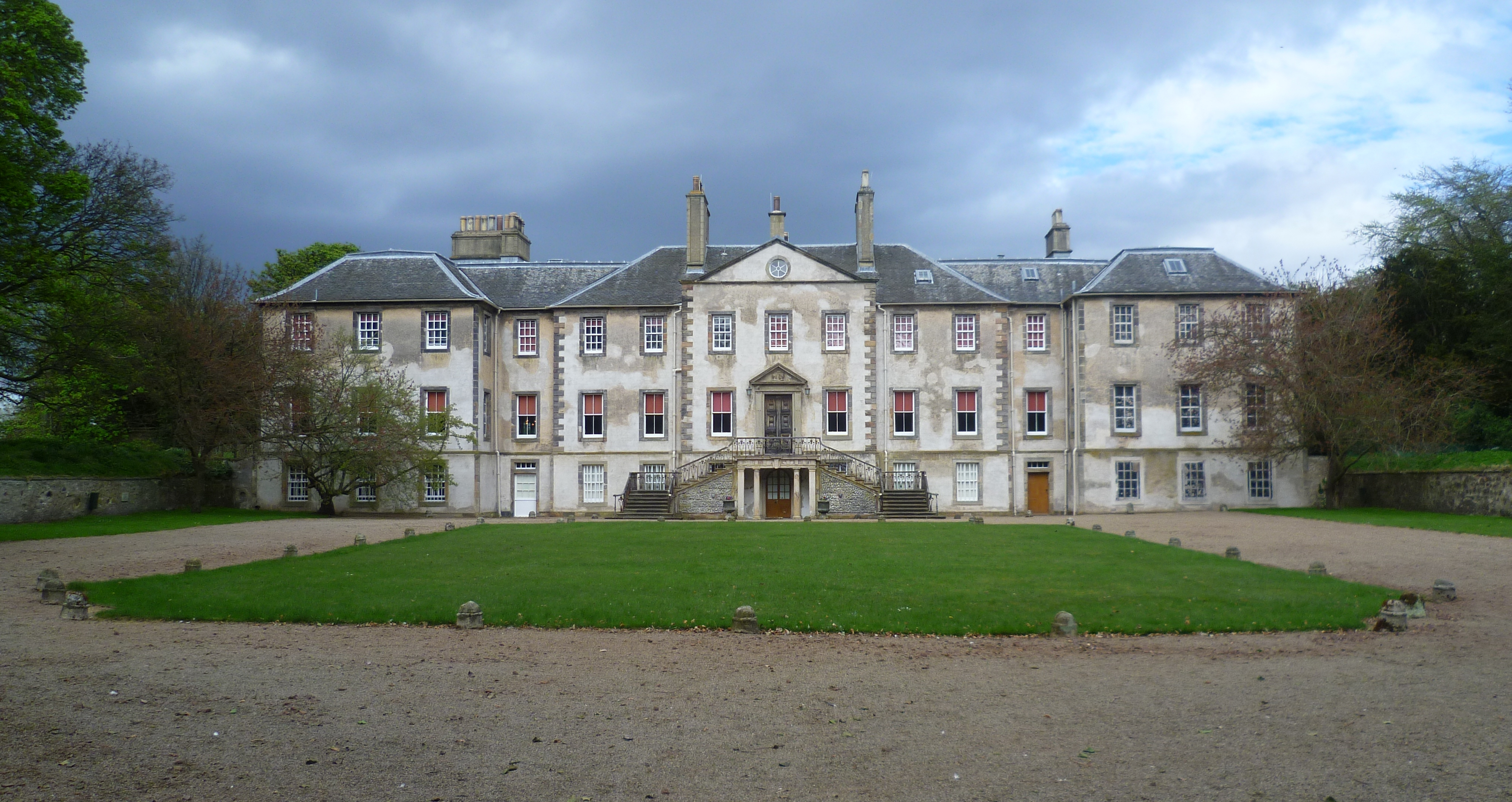
- Newhailes

- Location of Newhailes in East Lothian
- 55.94086°N 3.079214°W
- Location: Musselburgh, East Lothian, Scotland, United Kingdom

History
- Built: 1686
- Built for: James Smith

Site notes
- Architect: James Smith

Listed Building – Category A
- Official name: Newhailes House with Gatepiers
- Designated: 21 January 1971
- Reference no.: LB10911

Inventory of Gardens and Designed Landscapes in Scotland
- Official name: Newhailes
- Designated: 30 March 2001
- Reference no.: GDL00296

Newhailes House is a Palladian style country house which stands in 80 acres of parkland on the edge of the small town of Musselburgh in East Lothian, Scotland. It is a Category A listed building which is now occupied and maintained by the National Trust for Scotland.

The current building comprises the original 7-bay frontage flanked by later extensions.

The stable block is also a Category A building.

== Newhailes, the Dalrymples and the Scottish Enlightenment ==
The origins of the house date back to 1686, when the Scots architect James Smith purchased the lands of Whytehill, where Newhailes now stands. James Smith is believed to have studied for the Catholic priesthood in Rome as a young man, but after being inspired by the works of Andrea Palladio, he returned to Scotland in 1675, and instead pursued a career as an architect. Smith had intended to profit from the coal seams below Whytehill and had patented machinery for this purpose, but his venture failed and in financial difficulty, he sold the land to John Bellenden, 2nd Lord Bellenden, in 1702, for 40,000 Scots Merks. He also accepted a commission from Bellenden to build a villa on the grounds, to be named Broughton House, which was built using the foundations and ruins of an earlier structure. This original villa comprised only the central core of the current Newhailes House – the two extensions, the Library and Great Apartment wings, were added later by the Dalrymple family.

=== Sir David Dalrymple, 1st Baronet, of Hailes (1665–1720) ===
After the death of Bellenden in 1707, his wife, Mary, Countess of Dalhousie, could no longer afford to keep the house, and in May 1709, sold the property to Sir David Dalrymple, 1st Baronet and his wife, Janet Rochead. He renamed the house New Hailes in recognition of Hailes Castle on their family estate at East Linton, and added the first of the two major extensions to Newhailes, the Library Wing, which was completed in 1721, the year after his death. This anticipated the beginnings of the Enlightenment culture, based on close readings of new books, and intense discussions at intellectual gathering places in Edinburgh and in societies such as The Select Society in the 1750s. Sir David was a Scottish advocate and politician who sat in the Parliament of Scotland from 1698 to 1707 and in the British House of Commons from 1707 to 1721. He served as Lord Advocate, and eventually Auditor of the Exchequer in Scotland in 1720. The Dalrymples were to become a wealthy Edinburgh legal and political dynasty; the Enlightenment would become the golden age of artistic and intellectual development in Scotland.

Note: His older brother, John Dalrymple, 1st Earl of Stair, became one of the darkest figures in Scottish history when he organised and authorised the 1692 Massacre of Glencoe.

=== Sir James Dalrymple, 2nd Baronet (1692–1751) ===
On his death in 1721 the house passed to his heir Sir James Dalrymple, 2nd Baronet, a Member of Parliament (MP) for Haddington Burghs and the Principal Auditor of the Exchequer in Scotland. Sir James extended and reshaped the house, adding a balancing west extension, the Great Apartment wing, and re-orienting the entrance from the north-east to the south-west. The gardens were probably laid out at the same time. In the pediment over the front door are the heads of a male and a female in profile with the inscription laudo manentum, a quote from Horace referring to 'fickle fortune' and translating as 'I praise her while she stays'. Over the north door of the house is inscribed another Horace quote sapienter uti which relates to the happy man who wisely uses whatever he has been given to work with. It is considered by many that the carved heads that can be seen over the main entrance were inspired by the famous and controversial Edinburgh 'Netherbow Heads' that were at the time considered to be of Roman origin, representing the Emperor Septimius Severus and his consort Julia Domna. While less is known about the life of the 2nd Baronet than of his father and his heir, he and his wife Christian Hamilton were responsible for much of the decoration and adornments that may be seen now in the central spaces of the house.

=== Sir David Dalrymple, Lord Hailes, 3rd Baronet of Hailes (1726–1792) ===
The house then passed to Sir David Dalrymple, Lord Hailes, 3rd Baronet of Hailes (28 October 1726 – 29 November 1792). He became an advocate, judge and historian. Lord Hailes continued the Scottish tradition of completing his legal education in The Netherlands, studying in Utrecht before being admitted to the Faculty of Advocates in 1748, where he demonstrated an interest in books by becoming a curator in 1752. 'He moved normally in the highest ranks of Edinburgh Society' and appears to us as a textbook character of the Scottish Enlightenment. He attended the theatre and dancing assemblies, the profits from which went to charitable causes, and between 1750 and 1774 took a prominent part in many of Edinburgh's most famous cultural activities. Hailes was highly active in the club life of Edinburgh, being a member of, amongst others, the Select Society. The Society, founded in 1754 by Allan Ramsay, had a membership composed of socially prominent members of the city's elite, featuring many of the important figures of Scotland's Enlightenment. Although set up as a debating club, the importance of maintaining polite society was recognised by the rule that anything could be discussed 'except such as regard Revealed Religion, or which may give occasion to vent any principles of Jacobitism'. Hailes' nature and interest in his fellow man is shown by his involvement in an offshoot of the Select Society, known as the Edinburgh Society, one of the best examples of the improving spirit of the age.

Following their return from the Highlands, Samuel Johnson and James Boswell met Lord Hailes at dinner in Edinburgh on 17 August 1773. It would be later declared by Dr Johnson, "the most learned drawing-room in Europe". Boswell records that Lord Hailes 'pleased him [i.e. Johnson] highly'. We know Johnson respected Hailes's intellectual prowess as manuscripts of his Annals of Scotland were submitted, via Boswell, to Johnson for his literary opinion. Johnson claimed 'I never before read Scotch history with certainty' and wrote to Boswell calling them 'a new mode of history which tells all that is wanted ... without laboured splendour of language, or affected subtilty [sic] of conjectur'. Sir David inherited the house in 1751, and in 1970 added the stable block, designed by James Craig. But the most important room at Newhailes is the library. From the 1750s as head of the family, Sir David Dalrymple, the judge Lord Hailes was a key figure in the Scottish Enlightenment, along with Adam Smith and David Hume who borrowed extensively from the library. At the mahogany desk which stands in the shuttered gloom of the two-storey library he wrote the 'Annals of Scottish History', known as the first "modern" history of Scotland. After his death the house passed to Christian Dalrymple: Hailes had believed, fought for in his career, for the right of primogeniture - his specific belief was that the first born child, and not the eldest male child, should inherit.

=== Miss Christian Dalrymple of New Hailes (1765–1839) ===
In 1792, Miss Christian Dalrymple of New Hailes (30 December 1765 – 9 January 1839) daughter of Anne Broun and Sir David Dalrymple, Lord Hailes, inherited the Newhailes estate in East Lothian, Scotland, unexpectedly. She never married and lived there for 46 years. She lavished attention on the surrounding estate and developed the designed landscape, notably adding in 1827 a flower garden, designed by John Hay. She also used the library as a ballroom, and was an able manager and socialite hosting glittering dances and soirées long into the night. She kept a diary discussing and reflecting on the minutiae of her day. It is forms part of Newhailes collection at the National Library of Scotland. She died at the age of seventy-two, leaving the estate to her nephew, Charles Fergusson, with whom she had a close and long-standing relationship, evidenced by correspondence between the two.

=== Sir Charles Dalrymple Fergusson, 5th Baronet (1800–1849) ===
Sir Charles Dalrymple Fergusson, 5th Baronet of Kilkerran FRSE (1800–1849) was a Scottish lawyer. He was educated at Harrow, and became an advocate in 1822, practising at the Scottish bar until his father's death. He was a member of the Speculative Society, and at its meetings read two essays, one on the 'Origin and Progress of Criminal Jurisprudence', and the other on the 'History of Painting'. In 1829 he was elected a Fellow of the Royal Society of Edinburgh. In 1837, Fergusson succeeded to the estates of his grandfather, Lord Hailes, in East and Mid Lothian, and in 1838 to those of his father in Ayrshire. He lived mainly at Kilkerran with his family, but did spend periods at Newhailes; he also rented out Newhailes at times when he did not need the property. He inherited Newhailes, and the Lordship and Barony of Hailes in 1839, on the death of his aunt, Miss Christian Dalrymple (when he also assumed the additional surname of Dalrymple). Fergusson married Helen, daughter of the David Boyle, lord-justice-general of Scotland, by whom he had nine children. He died at Inveresk 18 March 1849.

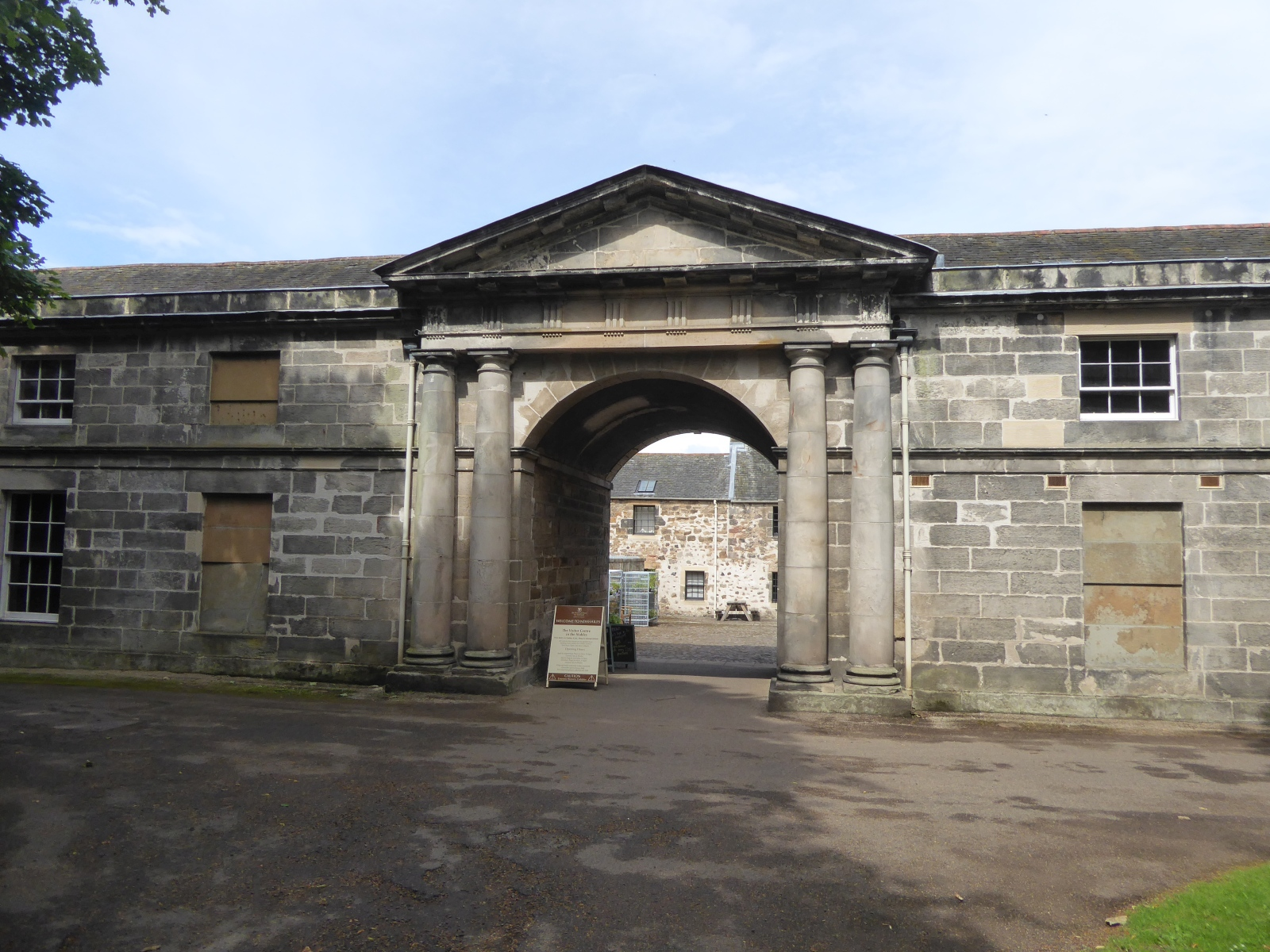
Entrance to stable courtyard

== The last Dalrymples – 19th–21st century ==
=== Sir Charles Dalrymple, 1st Baronet (1839–1916) ===
Born Charles Fergusson, Sir Charles Dalrymple, 1st Baronet was the second surviving son of Sir Charles Dalrymple Fergusson, 5th Baronet, and grandson of Sir James Fergusson, 4th Baronet, and his wife Jean, daughter of David Dalrymple, Lord Hailes. Sir James Fergusson, 6th Baronet, was his elder brother. On the death of his father in 1849 he assumed the surname of Dalrymple in lieu of Fergusson. He was educated at Harrow school and Trinity College, Cambridge, became a Scottish Conservative politician. He was created a baronet, of New Hailes in the County of Midlothian, in 1887, and sworn of the Privy Council, in 1905. He was married to Alice Mary Hunter Blair (1852–1889) daughter of Sir Edward, 4th Hunter-Blair baronet. They divided their time between London and Newhailes. The house was substantially modernised in 1907.

In the late 1890s Newhailes entertained politicians such as the Speaker of the House of Commons Arthur Peel, 1st Viscount Peel. Frequently Joseph Chamberlain best known as the leading imperialist of the day in Britain, as a Liberal Unionist before he joined the Colonial Office, and John Crichton-Stuart, 3rd Marquess of Bute, a landed aristocrat, industrial magnate and philanthropist. He was related to the Royal House of Stuart and the Coutts banking family. His visit coincided with his involvement with a notable company law case, relating to the insolvency of the Cardiff Savings Bank (1892) concerning a duty of care to which he was acquitted.

The Times would typically report the arrivals and departures of prominent people, as they did on 25 October 1901: "Mr. and Mrs. Chamberlain arrived in Edinburgh yesterday evening, the right hon. gentleman having engaged to address a meeting there today. The Colonial Secretary was received by Sir Charles Dalrymple, M.P., whose guest he will be at Newhailes, Musselburgh, during his visit, and after being introduced to several prominent members of the local Unionist party he drove away with his host amid cheers." Much later in 1926 and again in 1935 the house hosted Princess Helena Victoria of Schleswig-Holstein, Queen Victoria's granddaughter on her way to Balmoral. She was guest of Archibald Kennedy, 4th Marquess of Ailsa styled Earl Cassilis until 1938, and David Dalrymple's sister in law, Frances Countess Cassillis (née McTaggart-Stewart) who were renting the house at the time.

Their first daughter, Christian Elizabeth Louise, was born in 1875, their son David Charles Herbert Dalrymple born in London 1879, and their youngest daughter Alice Mary born in 1884. Five years later, Alice Mary, Charles's wife, died. In bereavement, feeling unable to offer a family environment, he sent his children away to relatives. Alice (5yrs) was sent to her Aunt Eleanor, wife of the Rector of Hartlebury in Worcestershire. David (10 yrs) and his older sister Christian (14 yrs) were sent to his mother's sister Aunt Dorothea, who had married a career naval captain David Boyle, who had fought at the Crimea, later becoming David Boyle, 7th Earl of Glasgow at Shewalton House in Ayrshire.

Around 1901, the two daughters were reunited with their father, taking up residence at his London house in Onslow Gardens, where he died in June 1916. Christian married a Royal Naval officer Commander John Saumarez Dumaresq, in 1907. The wedding was held at St. Peter's Episcopal Church, Musselburgh. She had five children and died in 1932.

Alice never married, and became the sole beneficiary of her brother David's will. She lived quietly at Halkerston Lodge in Inveresk Village where she died in 1959.

Sir Charles' Will was carefully drawn up under Scottish law by the old established firm of Messrs. Hope, Todd & Kirk W S from their offices in Charlotte Square Edinburgh. The Will was published testate later that year on 19 December 1916. It began, "I, the Right Honourable Sir Charles Dalrymple of Newhailes Baronet, Privy Councillor, being desirous of settling the succession to my means and estate after my death, and of securing as far as I can that my said lands and estate of Newhailes shall not be sold, it being my desire that they be retained in the family,..." Clearly aware of his only son's character, his will was specific in its terms. The estate was to be held in trust by four trustees Sir Charles Fergusson, 7th Baronet (his nephew), Forbes Hunter Blair (brother-in-law), Honourable George John Gordon Bruce Lord Balfour of Burleigh, seventh Lord Balfour of Burleigh, a cousin, and his son David. On his father's death Sir David became a relatively wealthy man. Sir Charles had left around £90,000 (£5 million today) in cash and stocks plus Newhailes House and its estate, together with his house in London.

=== Sir David Charles Herbert Dalrymple, 2nd Baronet (1879–1932) ===
Influenced by David Boyle's extensive career in the Royal Navy, David enrolled in the Britannia Royal Naval College as a thirteen-year-old Midshipman. It was during his career in the navy he met Margaret Anna Mctaggart-Stewart at a London party, whilst on leave serving as Lieutenant with HMS Falcon (1899). They married in St George's Hanover Square Church on 3 April 1906. His career in the Royal Navy was chequered with various disciplinary actions concerning conduct. After facing two courts martial, he eventually resigned from the service in 1911. They had a daughter Dorothea Mary in March 1912, who tragically died in November 1914, and a son, Charles Mark Dalrymple, in May 1915. David and Margaret divorced in 1919, after his widely publicised affair at the Royal Albion Hotel in Brighton with actress Mrs Dorothy Lewis, 20 years his junior. After the divorce, Margaret Dalrymple decided to leave Newhailes and live with her sister Susanna in Maybole Ayrshire.

There followed an advertisement appeared in The Times on 12 November 1919.

“THE MANSION-HOUSE OF NEWHAILES TO BE LET FURNISHED, FOR SUCH A PERIOD AS MAY BE AGREED ON, WITH IMMEDIATE ENTRY"

"Situation – the Mansion-House of Newhailes is situated about 5 miles from the Post Office, Edinburgh; 16 minutes by rail from Waverley Station or 45 minutes by tramcar from Edinburgh and 5 minutes from Musselburgh. The house is 18th century with a fine front and circular flight of steps to front door, and a courtyard in front with pillared entrance. The interior is very hansome and ornate, with richly panelled walls and pictures inset. At the back there is a grass park of 2½ acres surrounded by terraces. There is a private entrance from Newhailes station to the grounds." The advertisement went on to describe the number of bedrooms, reception rooms and facilities, saying the drainage was in good order and the house connected to the Edinburgh telephone exchange (Musselburgh 132), asking interested parties to contact Messrs. Hope Todd and Kirk W S of 19 Charlotte Street, Edinburgh. The house it seems was difficult to rent, and it was again advertised in February 1920 and repeated in May and again in August. By December 1921 it was again advertised to let in The Times and The Scotsman hoping to attract a family by adding:

"This house has been THOROUGHLY MODERNISED, and has been fitted throughout with ELECTRIC LIGHT"

David married Dorothy Lewis in London in August 1923; she became Lady Dorothy Mirabelle Cynthia Dalrymple. They lived in London; both hedonistic, they partied, largely neglecting Newhailes, which was eventually leased to the Earl and Countess of Cassillis, Marquess of Ailsa, Margaret's elder married sister, from the trustees.

Their social lifestyle put demands on the Newhailes trustees and various house antiques were sold at auction at Sotheby's and Frank Partridge & Sons. Within a few years, the actress and the peer had drifted apart, leading separate lives. Dorothy went back to the theatre, and David eventually died of a heart attack at his flat near Regent's Park, in Walton House, Longford Street on 2 December 1932 age 53. A month before he had changed his will, stating "I give devise appoint and bequeath all my real and personal property of whatever nature or kind and wheresoever situate unto my said sister Alice Dalrymple absolutely...." Using Scottish law, he essentially had disinherited Dorothy. She married Frederick William Hartman in 1933, became a successful Mayfair hostess, inherited his business Lendrum & Hartman Limited and died in 1957.

=== Sir Mark Dalrymple, 3rd Baronet (1915–1971) died without issue ===
After his parents' divorce, Sir Mark Dalrymple's mother married Sir Patrick Graham Blake Blake baronets in 1925, he died five years later. Mark was taken on a world tour by his widowed mother (Lady Blake). They left England for New York on the Cunard SS Berengaria SS Imperator in November 1935, across the US to San Francisco and on to Honolulu in December, later Australia. They returned to England via Ceylon Sri Lanka by P&O SS RMS Strathaird in May 1936. He served with Royal Scots Territorials 1937 to 1940, then in 1941, during the Second World War, joined the Royal Air Force.

In 1935, Mark and his mother discovered on a visit to Newhailes that the estate had been reduced in size – much of the grounds facing the sea front were taken over by the construction of various houses, notably in an area parallel with the main road to Edinburgh. Upon raising this matter with Hope, Todd & Kirk, it was discovered that his father had instructed the Newhailes trustees to feu part of the grounds for the purposes of housebuilding. Despite Mark's attempts to reverse the development, this area expanded – as was pointed out by the solicitors, the estate simply needed the funds.

Mark married Antonia Marian Amy Isabel Stewart, in 1946 the only daughter of Randolph Stewart, 12th Earl of Galloway a military man, and his American wife Philippa Wendell, whose sister was married to Henry Herbert, 6th Earl of Carnarvon, whose father had funded archaeologist Howard Carter when he discovered the tomb of Tutankhamun.

They had no children and when Mark died in June 1971, following a heart attack, the Barony became extinct. The house became vacant around 1980.

Finally, in 2011 at the age of 71 the widowed Lady Antonia left her apartment in the house and went to live in a cottage on the estate. She died at the Cluny Lodge Nursing Home, Edinburgh, 15 July 2017, aged 91. Thus ended 300 years of the Dalrymples of Newhailes.

== Inveresk Churchyard ==
About 2 miles from Newhailes House is the village of Inveresk, situated immediately to the south of Musselburgh. It has been designated a conservation area since 1969. There has been a church on the site since the 6th century. The present church Saint Michael's was built in 1805, to the design of Robert Nisbet; the steeple by William Sibbald. The interior was reoriented and remodelled in 1893 and again in 2002. Known as the "Visible Kirk" because of its prominent position, it stands on the site of a Roman praetorium and replaces a medieval church. The interior has a fine Adam-style ceiling and some excellent stained glass. Magnificent pipe organ by Lewis & Co 1892, originally built with early form of electric action.

It has been used by successions of the Dalrymple family and a number of them have been buried or remembered there:

- Alice Mary Hunter Dalrymple-Fergusson (Blair) 14 May 1852 – 2 September 1889
- Rt. Honourable Sir Charles Dalrymple 1st Bart. 15 October 1839 – 20 June 1916
- Christian Elizabeth Louisa Dumaresq (Dalrymple) 9 July 1875 – 9 April 1932
- Sir David Dalrymple 2nd Bart. 28 March 1879 – 2 December 1932
- Alice Mary Dalrymple 31 August 1884 – 23 October 1959
- Sir Mark Dalrymple 3rd Bart. 13 May 1915 – 29 June 1971

The last of the Newhailes Dalrymples

- Lady Antonia Dalrymple (Stewart) 3 December 1925 – 15 July 2017 Seafield Crematorium, Edinburgh

=== Morham church ===
About 17 miles to the east of Inveresk is the Dalrymple loft and mausoleum of circa 1730, an imposing feature on the north side of Morham church, East Lothian. The village, once a few hundred yards south of the church, has vanished. The present building of 1724 replaced a church of 1685 and stands in a secluded hollow in a very neat walled burial ground.

== National Trust acquisition of house and estate ==
In 1976, the books and Lord Hailes's papers were removed to the National Library of Scotland in lieu of death duties following the death of Sir Mark Dalrymple at the age of 56. The Government accepted around seven thousand volumes from the Newhailes Library, the collection included: history and biography (c. 1,800 volumes), classical and modern literature (c. 2,500 volumes), law, politics and economics (c. 1,000 volumes), and theology (c. 750 volumes).

In 1997, Newhailes house was given to the National Trust for Scotland by his wife Lady Antonia Dalrymple because the cost of upkeep had become impossible and the house was in danger of falling into disrepair. It was to allow to grow old gracefully through a pioneering conservation policy which does "as much as is necessary, but as little as possible" to keep the house in good order without disturbing its "untouched" atmosphere.

In 2002, Prince Charles made a visit to the opening of Newhailes House with NTS curator Ian Gow.

In 2016, the National Trust announced a £2.4 million investment plan to be spent on conservation, landscape enhancement, and on commercial and visitor services improvements.

In 2019, the National Trust for Scotland reported that it was undertaking a large-scale exercise to rid the house of moth infestation. 65,395 people visited the house during 2019.

=== Artwork on display in house ===
A number of paintings are on display within the house, largely Dalrymple family portraits by Scottish painter Allan Ramsay (1713–1784) and a selection of local landscapes by James Norie (1711–1736). There is a landscape (1816) by John Thomson of Duddingston (1778–1840) featuring the ancestral Hailes Castle and Traprain Law on display in the library.

=== The house facilities ===
Having been acquired by the National Trust for Scotland, it is open to the public by way of guided tours, and functions as a venue for weddings, corporate events and private parties. The grounds are free to visit.

=== Newhailes Stable Block ===
Situated to the south-west of Newhailes House, the stables and office block was built as part of the changes initiated on the estate in 1798 (with the north and east ranges constructed in 1826). They comprise a two-storey quadrangular Classical stable court, incorporating late 17th century to mid-18th century builds in the north-west and south-west ranges. After designs by James Craig, circa 1792. The buildings are currently under renovation with a view for conversion to provide upgraded welcome and catering facilities for visitors.

=== Newhailes garden ===
A rare surviving example of an early to mid-18th century Rococo landscape garden, created in the formative period of the 'natural' style in Scotland, laid out during 1720–1740s for the Dalrymple family. It has associations with James Smith, (architect 1645–1731), the architect's own home, known as Whitehill before Newhailes, and the horticulturalist and garden designer John Hay (1758–1836). Considered "...the most eminent horticultural architect Scotland has ever produced."

=== The Pleasure Grounds ===
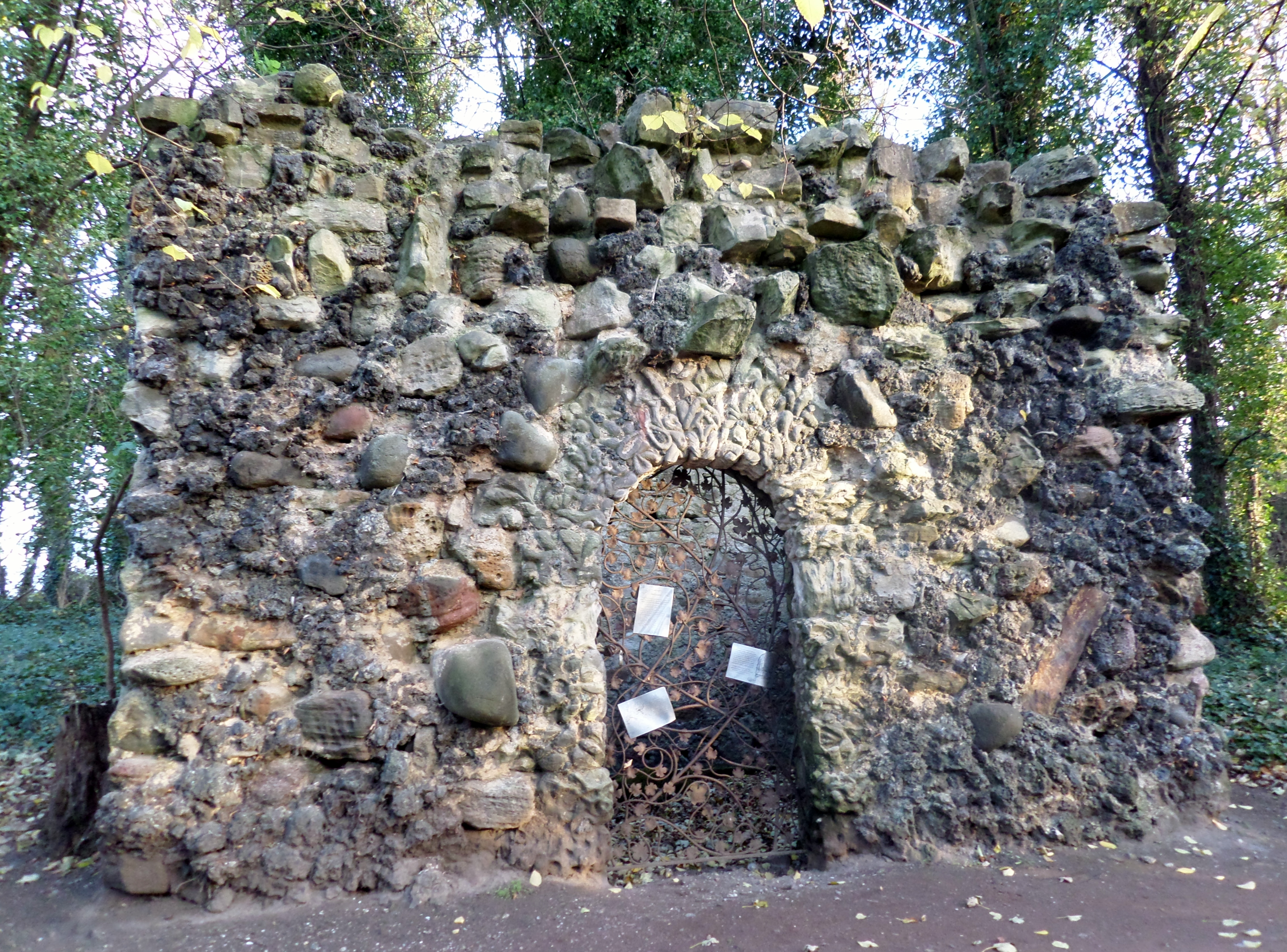
Ruins of the Shell Grotto

The estate is notable for the remains of a 'Shell Grotto'. The fashion for such grottoes was at its height in the later 18th century, popularised by precedents at Stourhead estate, in Wiltshire c.1748, and Pope's villa Grotto in Twickenham, c. 1725. The Newhailes Grotto was Commissioned by Lord Hailes, built c. 1785, as a pleasure ground to the north of the house. There are the remains of square plan rocaille grotto set in woodlands, currently roofless. The interior formerly lined with decorative sea shell patterns, mounted on timber panels, of which only remnants remain in woodland around.
In addition a 'Tea House' standing upon a Palladian bridge with views of cascades and waterfalls. The 'Ladies' Walk' on its raised terrace between the Cow and Sheep Parks is thought to be unique in Scotland.

=== Newhailes railway station (closed 1950) ===
Newhailes railway station stood where the Newhailes Road (A6095) bridge crosses the rail track to Newcraighall Road. The house and estate had its own private entrance. First recorded as 'New Hailes' this station stood within the estate but served the town of Musselburgh as well as the estate from 1847 to 1950. The station name was changed from 'NEW HAILES' to 'NEWHAILES' in September 1938. The station opened sometime after the opening of the Musselburgh branch in 1847, and closed on 2 February 1950. The platform buildings are now occupied by Niddrie Bowling Club.

== Sources ==
- Abstract National Library of Scotland, Samuel Johnson and Newhailes Library.
- Allan, David, Making British Culture: English Leaders and the Scottish Enlightenment, 1740–1830 (London: Routledge, 2008), p. 37.
- Broadie, Alexander, The Scottish Enlightenment: the Historical Age of the Historical Nation (Edinburgh: Birlinn, 2007), pp. 26–27.
- Brown, Ian, General Editor, The Edinburgh History of Scottish Literature: Volume 2, Enlightenment, Britain and Empire 1707–1918, Edinburgh University Press, 2007.
- Cadel, Patrick, 'Dalrymple, Sir David, third baronet, Lord Hailes (1726–1792)', Oxford Dictionary of National biography (Oxford: Oxford University Press, 2004).
- Carnie, R.H., A biographical and Critical Study of the Life and Writings of Sir David Dairymple (doctoral thesis, University of St Andrews, 1954). Carnie's thesis is unpaginated.
- Cornforth, John, 'Newhailes', Country Life (21 November 1996), pp 46–51 (p. 51).
- Dalrymple, Sir David, Annals of Scotland, Volume I (Malcolm III to Robert I), J. Murray, Edinburgh, 1776 (Vol II appeared in 1779, Vol III appeared after his death).
- Dalrymple, Hew H., Editor, Christian Dalrymple, Private Annals of My Own Time, Douglas & Foulis, Edinburgh, 1914.
- Dann, John, Maud Coleno's Daughter -the life of Dorothy Hartman 1898–1957 (previously Lady Dalrymple 1923–1933), Troubador, 2017 (ACT III, Lord Dalrymple Entertains, chapters 12–18).
- Desmond, Ray, Dictionary of British and Irish Botantists & Horticulturalists, -Plant Collectors, Flower Painters & Garden Designers, Taylor & Francis, and National History Museum London 1994, p 1443
- Forman, Sheila G., 'Newhailes: A Link with Edinburgh's Little Golden Age', Scottish Field (September 1949), pp 20–21 (p. 21).
- Gow, Ian "The Most Learned Drawing Room in Europe?': Newhailes and the Classical Scottish Library", in Visions of Scotland's Past: Looking to the Future: Essays in Honour of John R. Hume, ed. by Deborah C. Mays, Michael S. Moss and Miles K. Oglethorpe (East Linton: Tuckwell Press, 2000), pp 81–96, (p. 94).
- Jarvie, Gordon, 'Beauty's Awakening', TES Magazine, (31 July 1998). Magnus Linklater, 'Second Enlightenment is Some Way Off', Scotland on Sunday, (18 February 2002).
- Montgomery-Massingberd, Hugh, Great Houses of Scotland, Laurence King, London, 1997 (p. 118).
- Norman, F.H., Ed. Memories of David, Seventh Earl of Glasgow, (1833–1915) Edinburgh, W. Brown, 1918.
- Pottle, Frederick A., Editor, Boswell's London Journal, 1762–1763, Book Club Associates, London, 1974.
- Reid, Peter H., 'The Decline and Fall of the British Country House Library', Libraries & Culture, vol. 36, no. 2, (2001), pp 345–66 (p. 359).
- Rock, Dr. Joseph (Joe), Newhailes New Research, consultant historian of Scottish material culture.
- Towsey, Mark Reading the Scottish Enlightenment: Libraries, Readers and Intellectual Culture in Provincial Scotland c.1750–c.1820 (doctoral thesis, University of St Andrews, 2007), p. 35.
- Weaver, Lawrence, 'Newhailes, Midlothian', Country Life (8 September 1917), pp 228–32.
