= Charles Dalrymple (disambiguation) =

Sir Charles Dalrymple, 1st Baronet was a Scottish politician.

Charles Dalrymple may also refer to:

- Sir Charles Dalrymple, 3rd Baronet (1915–1971), of the Dalrymple baronets

== See also ==
- Charles Dalrymple Fergusson
- Dalrymple (surname)
