= Jacob Tonson =

English bookseller and publisher (1655–1736)

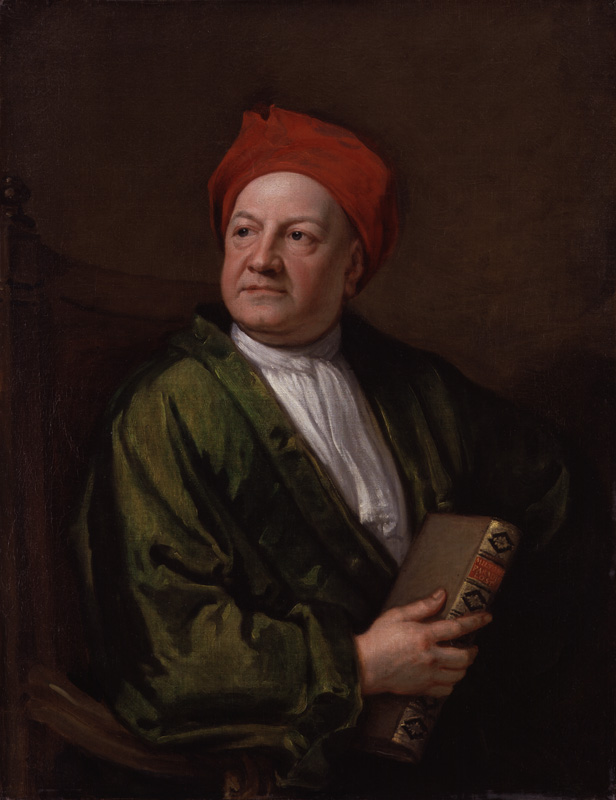
- Portrait of Jacob Tonson by Godfrey Kneller, 1717
- Born: 12 November 1655
- Died: 17 March 1735/6
- Occupations: Bookseller and publisher
- Parent: Jacob Tonson

Jacob Tonson, sometimes referred to as Jacob Tonson the Elder (12 November 1655 – 17 March 1736), was an eighteenth-century English bookseller and publisher who played an important role in the literary and publishing culture of the late seventeenth and early eighteenth centuries. He was particularly associated with the publication of works by John Dryden, John Milton, and William Shakespeare. Through his publishing activities and relationships with prominent authors, Tonson helped establish the commercial success of several writers whose works became central to the English literary canon.

Tonson was also the founder and secretary of the Kit-Cat Club, a literary and political association whose members included prominent writers, politicians, and other influential figures. His business developed into a publishing dynasty continued by his nephew, Jacob Tonson the Younger, and his great-nephew, also named Jacob Tonson.

== Early life and education ==
Jacob Tonson was born on 12 November 1655 in London, England. His father, also named Jacob Tonson, was a barber surgeon, and his mother was Elizabeth Walbancke Tonson. Parish records from St Andrew Holborn (parish) document his birth and baptism on 12 November 1655.

On 5 June 1670, Tonson was apprenticed to Thomas Basset, a London stationer, for eight years. Apprenticeships were an important route into the book trade during this period, providing training in the commercial and practical aspects of publishing and bookselling. Tonson became a freeman of the Worshipful Company of Stationers and Newspaper Makers on 20 December 1677, allowing him to establish his own business.

He began trading independently in 1678. His early shop was located at the Judge's Head in Chancery Lane, near Fleet Street, an important centre of London's publishing industry. God's Revenge Against the Abominable Sin of Adultery (1678) was his first publication. His brother Richard Tonson had also entered the bookselling trade.

== Publishing career ==
=== Partnership with John Dryden ===
One of Tonson's earliest significant publishing ventures was his acquisition of the publishing rights to John Dryden's play Troilus and Cressida (Dryden play) in 1679. This association developed into a long and commercially important relationship.

In 1681, Jacob and Richard Tonson published Dryden's The Spanish Friar. Jacob subsequently became increasingly involved in publishing Dryden's poetry, plays, translations, and literary criticism.

In 1684, Tonson published Miscellany Poems, a collection edited by Dryden. Further volumes appeared in 1685, 1693, 1694, 1703, and 1708. These collections, sometimes known as Dryden's Miscellany or Tonson's Miscellany, helped introduce readers to a range of contemporary poets and established a continuing market for collections of English poetry.

Tonson also published Dryden's translation of Virgil's works in 1697, which was financed through a subscription arrangement. Their professional relationship was not always harmonious. Correspondence between the two men reveals disagreements over payments, printing expenses, and the financial terms of their publishing arrangements. Nevertheless, their partnership continued to produce important publications until Dryden's death in 1700.

=== Publishing John Milton ===
Tonson also acquired an interest in the publishing rights to John Milton's Paradise Lost. In 1683, he purchased half of the rights from Barbazon Ailmer, the assignee of the original publisher Samuel Simmons. He acquired the remaining half in 1690.

The commercial success of Paradise Lost was significant for Tonson. He later reportedly remarked that he had earned more from the poem than from any other single work. His involvement helped ensure the continued circulation of Milton's epic poem among readers during the late seventeenth and early eighteenth centuries.

=== Other literary publications ===
Beyond Dryden and Milton, Tonson published works by numerous prominent writers, including Joseph Addison, Aphra Behn, William Congreve, John Vanbrugh, and Alexander Pope.

He published Addison's Remarks on Several Parts of Italy in 1705 and included Pope's early pastoral poems in the sixth volume of his literary miscellany in 1709.

Tonson also participated in the publication of classical and historical works. In 1703, he travelled to the Dutch Republic to obtain paper and engravings for an illustrated edition of Julius Casear's Commentaries. The edition was eventually published under the editorship of Samuel Clarke in 1712.

His publishing demonstrated an interest in both contemporary English literature and classical scholarship.

== Further roles in Renaissance literature ==
In the earlier part of his life Tonson was much associated with Dryden. A step which did much to establish his position was the publication in 1684 of a volume of Miscellany Poems, under Dryden's editorship. Other volumes followed in 1685, 1693, 1694, 1703, and 1708, and the collection, which was several times reprinted, is known as both as Dryden's Miscellany and Tonson's Miscellany. During the ensuing year Tonson continued to bring out pieces by Dryden, and on 6 October 1691 paid thirty guineas for all the author's rights in the printing of the tragedy of Cleomenes. Joseph Addison's Poem to his Majesty was published by Tonson in 1695, and there was some correspondence respecting a proposed joint translation of Herodotus by Boyle, Richard Blackmore, Addison, and others.

Dryden's translation of Virgil, executed between 1693 and 1696, was published by Tonson in July 1697 by subscription. Serious financial differences arose between the poet and his publisher, and Dryden's letters to Tonson (1695–1697) are full of complaints of meanness and sharp practice and of refusals to accept clipped or bad money. Tonson would pay nothing for notes; Dryden retorted, "The notes and prefaces shall be short, because you shall get the more by saving paper." He added that all the trade were sharpers, Tonson not more than others. Dryden described Tonson thus, in lines written under his portrait, and afterwards printed in Faction Displayed (1705):

With leering looks, bull-faced, and freckled fair;
With two left legs, and Judas-coloured hair,
And frowzy pores, that taint the ambient air.

Subsequently the letters became more friendly, and on the publication of Alexander's Feast, in late 1697, Dryden wrote to Tonson, "I hope it has done you service, and will do more."

Dryden's collection of translations from Boccaccio, Chaucer, and others, known as The Fables, was published by Tonson in November 1699; a second edition did not appear until 1713. There is an undated letter from Mrs. Aphra Behn to Tonson at Bayfordbury, thanking him warmly for what he had said on her behalf to Dryden. She begged hard for five pounds more than Tonson offered for some of her verses. In connection with Jeremy Collier's attack on the stage, the Middlesex justices presented the playhouses in May 1698, and also William Congreve for writing the Double Dealer, Thomas d'Urfey for Don Quixote, and Tonson and Brisco, booksellers, for printing them. Tonson published Congreve's reply to Collier, and at a later date The Faithful Friend and The Confederacy by his friend, Sir John Vanbrugh.

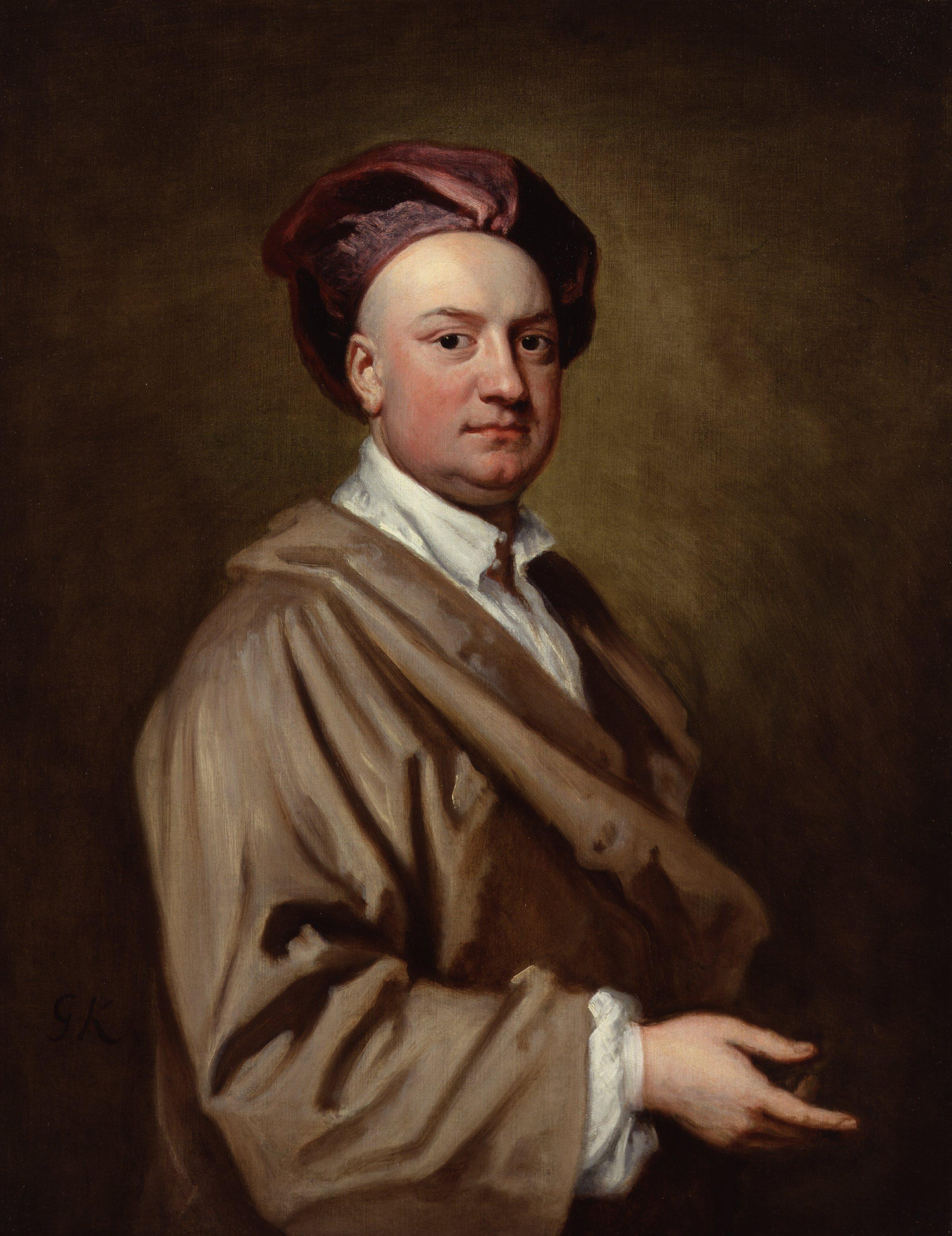
Jacob Tonson took into partnership his nephew (pictured), also named Jacob Tonson and sometimes referred to as Tonson Junior.

Before the end of the century Tonson had moved from the Judge's Head to a shop in Gray's Inn Gate, probably the one previously occupied by his brother Richard. It is not unlikely that Richard was dead, and that Jacob, who had no children, and seemingly never married, now took into partnership his nephew Jacob, whose son was afterwards to be his heir. It is not always easy to distinguish the uncle from the nephew in later years; the latter is sometimes referred to as Tonson Junior.

By 1700 Tonson's position was well established, and about that time the Kit-Cat Club was founded, with Tonson as secretary. The meetings were first held at a mutton-pie shop in Shire Lane, kept by Christopher Cat, and may have begun with suppers given by Tonson to his literary friends. About 1703 Tonson purchased a house at Barn Elms, and built a room there for the club. In a poem on the club, attributed to Sir Richard Blackmore, we find:

One night in seven at this convenient seat
Indulgent Bocaj [Jacob] did the Muses treat.

Tonson was satirised in several skits, and it was falsely alleged that he had been expelled by the club, or had withdrawn from the society in scorn of being their jest any longer.

At Amsterdam and Rotterdam he met Addison, and assisted in some abortive negotiations for Addison's employment as travelling companion to Lord Hertford, son of the Duke of Somerset. In 1705 Tonson published Addison's Remarks on several Parts of Italy.

Verses by young Alexander Pope were circulating among the critics in 1705, and in April 1706 Tonson wrote to Pope proposing to publish a pastoral poem of his. Pope's pastorals ultimately appeared in Tonson's sixth Miscellany (May 1709). William Wycherley wrote that Tonson had long been gentleman-usher to the Muses: "you will make Jacob's ladder raise you to immortality."

Nicholas Rowe's edition of Shakespeare, in six volumes, was published early in 1709 by Tonson, who had previously advertised for materials. Richard Steele dined at Tonson's in 1708–1709, sometimes to get a bill discounted, sometimes to hear manuscripts read and advise upon them. There is a tradition that in earlier days Steele had had a daughter by a daughter of Tonson's; if this is true, it must apparently have been a daughter of Richard Tonson, Jacob's brother. In the autumn of 1710 Tonson moved to the Shakespeare's Head, opposite Catherine Street in the Strand; his former shop at Gray's Inn Gate was announced for sale in the Tatler for 14 October (No. 237); and it seems to have been taken by Thomas Osborne, stationer, the father of the afterwards well-known publisher, Thomas Osborne (died 1767). On 26 July 1711, after a long interval, Swift met Addison and Steele "at young Jacob Tonson's". "The two Jacobs", says Jonathan Swift to Esther Johnson, "think it I who have made the secretary take from them the printing of the Gazette, which they are going to lose.... Jacob came to me t'other day to make his court; but I told him it was too late, and that it was not my doing." Accounts furnished to Steele by Tonson of the sale of the collective editions of the Tatler and Spectator have been preserved; from October 1712 Tonson's name was joined with Samuel Buckley's as publisher of the Spectator. In November 1712 Addison and Steele sold all their right and title in one half of the copies of the first seven volumes of the Spectator to Tonson the younger, for £575, and all rights in the other half for a similar sum to Buckley. Buckley in October 1714 reassigned his half-share in the Spectator to Tonson junior for £500.

Tonson published Addison's tragedy, Cato, in April 1713; and, according to a concocted letter of Pope's, the true reason why Steele brought the Guardian to an end in October was a quarrel with Tonson, its publisher; "he stood engaged to his bookseller in articles of penalty for all the Guardians, and by desisting two days, and altering the title of the paper to that of the Englishman, was quit of the obligation, those papers being printed by Buckley." There are various reasons why this story is improbable; the truth seems to be that Steele was anxious to write on politics with a freer hand than was practicable in the Guardian. In the summer of 1714 we hear of Steele writing political pamphlets at Tonson's, where there were three bottles of wine of Steele's, and in October Tonson printed Steele's Ladies' Library. Tonson appears in Rowe's Dialogue between Tonson and Congreve, in imitation of Horace:

Thou, Jacob Tonson, were, to my conceiving,
The cheerfullest, best, honest fellow living.

In the same year Tonson, with Barnaby Bernard Lintot and William Taylor, was appointed one of the printers of the parliamentary votes. Next year he paid fifty guineas for the copyright of Addison's comedy, The Drummer, and published Thomas Tickell's translation of the first book of the Iliad, which gave offence to Pope. On 6 February 1718 Lintot entered into a partnership agreement with Tonson for the purchase of plays during eighteen months following that date.

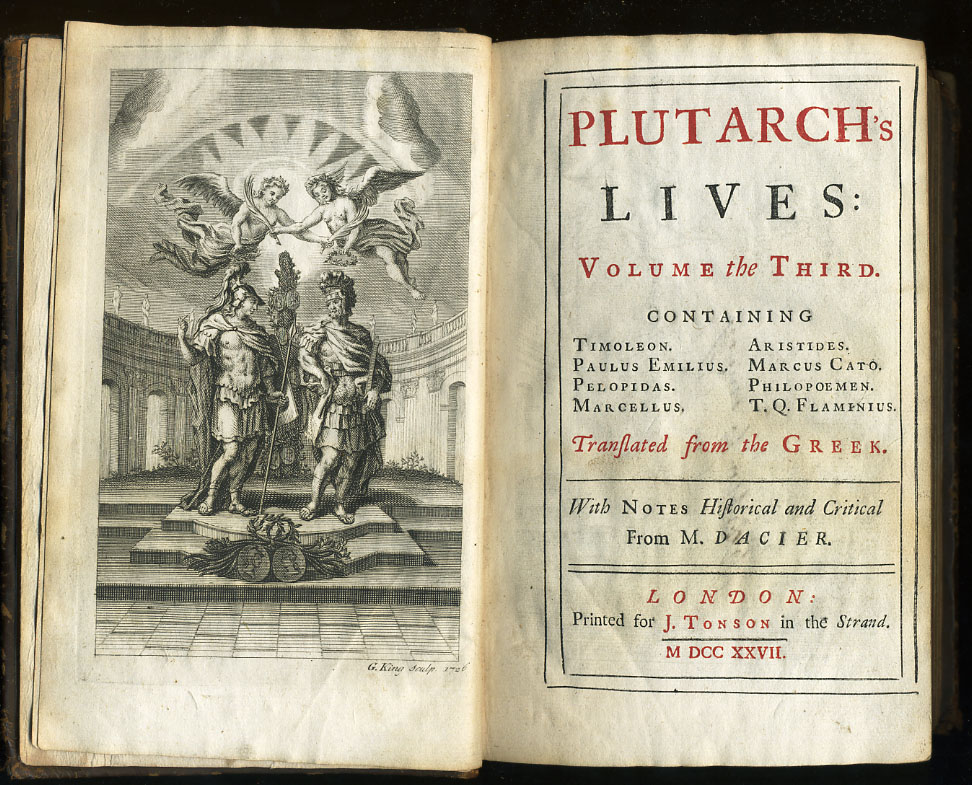
The title page of a 1727 English translation of Plutarch's Parallel Lives, published by Tonson

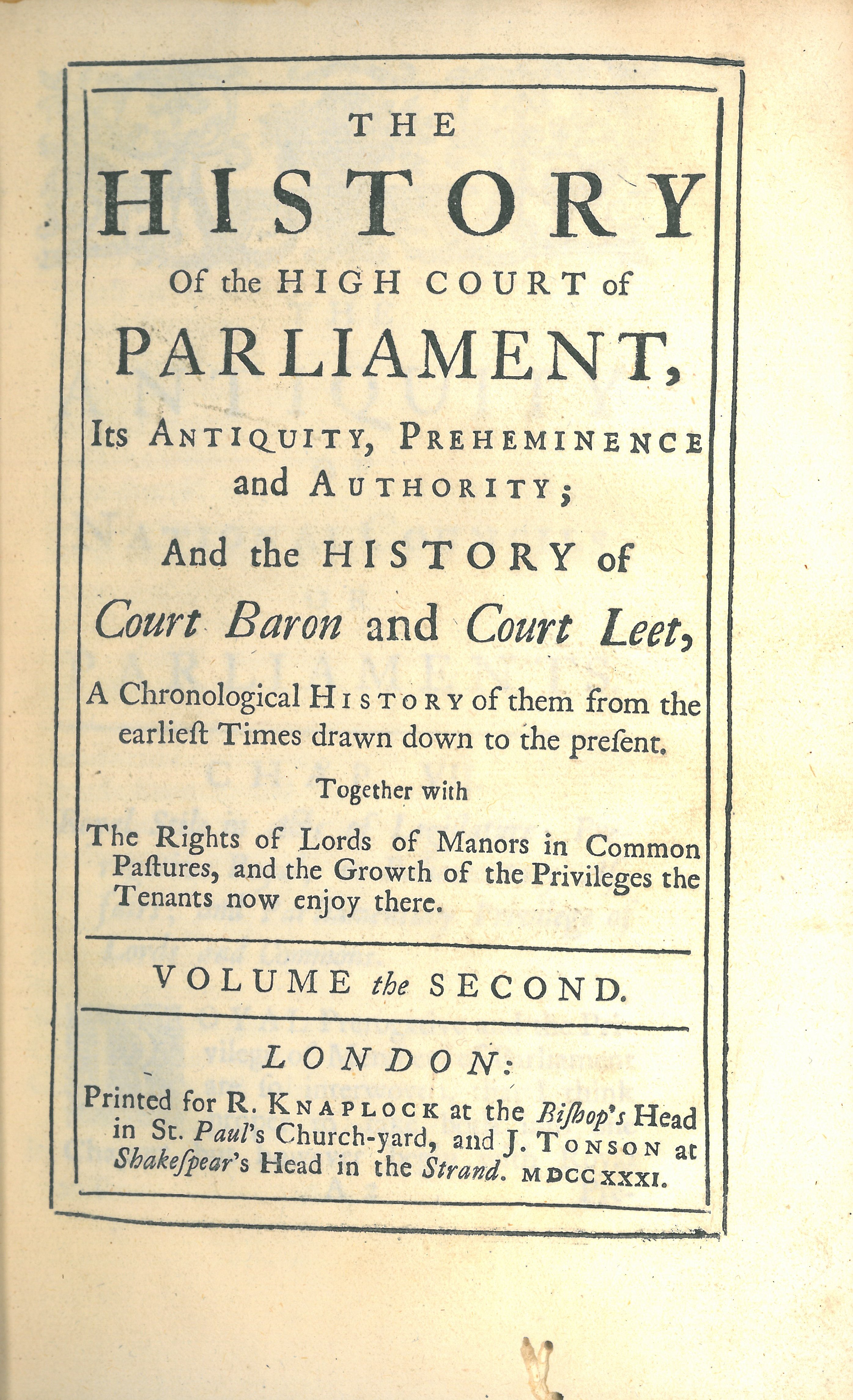
The title page of volume 2 of Thornhagh Gurdon's A History of the High Court of Parliament (1st ed., 1731), which was printed for "J. Tonson at Shakespear's Head in the Strand"

In one of several amusing letters from Vanbrugh, now at Bayfordbury, Tonson, who was then in Paris, was congratulated upon his luck in South Sea stock, and there is other evidence that he made a large sum in connection with Law's Mississippi scheme. "He has got £40,000" wrote Robert Arbuthnot; "riches will make people forget their trade." In January 1720 Tonson obtained a grant to himself and his nephew of the office of stationer, bookseller, and printer to some of the principal public offices; and on 12 October 1722 he assigned the whole benefit of the grant to his nephew. The grant was afterwards renewed by Robert Walpole, in 1733, for a second term of forty years. The elder Tonson seems to have given up business about 1720. He had bought the Hazells estate at Ledbury, Herefordshire, and in 1721 he was sending presents of cider to the Dukes of Grafton and Newcastle, the latter of whom called Tonson "my dear old friend," and asked him to give him his company in Sussex. Henceforth we may suppose, in the absence of evidence to the contrary, that "Tonson" in contemporary allusions means the nephew.

Steele's Conscious Lovers appeared in 1722, and Tonson assigned to Lintot half the copyright for £70. He had to apply to the court of chancery for an injunction to stop Robert Tooke and others printing a pirated edition of the play; the sum paid for the copyright was £40. In the same year Tonson published the Duke of Buckingham's Works, and in 1725 Pope's edition of Shakespeare.

Proposals were issued by Tonson in January 1729 for completing the subscription to the new edition of Rymer's Fœdera, in seventeen folio volumes (of which fifteen were then printed), at fifty guineas the set. The work was finished in 1735. Tonson published a quarto edition of Waller's works, edited by Fenton, in 1729, and an edition of Lord Lansdowne's works in 1732. Pope was annoyed to find in 1731 that Tonson was to be one of the publishers of Lewis Theobald's proposed edition of Shakespeare, in which he feared an attack on his own editorial work, but he professed to be satisfied with the assurances he received. In writing to the elder Tonson on this subject, Pope asked for any available information respecting the "Man of Ross," and, in thanking him for the particulars received, explained his intention in singling out this man as the centre of a poem. Earlier in the year the elder Tonson was in town, and Pope, writing to Lord Oxford, said that if he would come to see him he would show him a phenomenon worth seeing, "old Jacob Tonson, who is the perfect image and likeness of Bayle's Dictionary; so full of matter, secret history, and wit and spirit, at almost fourscore." On 19 March Lord Oxford, Lord Bathurst, Pope, and Gay dined with old Tonson at Barnes and drank Swift's health. In 1734 Samuel Gibbons was appointed stationer to the Prince of Wales in place of Jacob Tonson.

== Death and legacy ==
Jacob Tonson the Elder died at Ledbury on 17 March 1736. His death followed that of his nephew, Jacob Tonson the Younger, who had died in November 1735, worth £100,000. The elder Tonson's will was made on 2 December 1735 and proven in probate on 2 April 1736, when he was described as worth £40,000.

A painting of the elder Tonson by Godfrey Kneller is among the Kit-Cat portraits; it is best known through Faber's engraving. Pope says that Tonson obtained portraits from Kneller without payment by flattering him and sending him presents of venison and wine. Dryden's satirical account of his appearance has been quoted; Pope, in The Dunciad calls him "left-legged Jacob" and "genial Jacob". John Dunton describes Tonson as "a very good judge of persons and authors; and as there is nobody more competently qualified to give their opinion of another, so there is none who does it with a more severe exactness or with less partiality; for, to do Mr. Tonson justice, he speaks his mind upon all occasions, and will flatter nobody." No doubt this roughness of manner wore off as Tonson grew in prosperity.

== Jacob Tonson the younger ==
Jacob Tonson (died 1767) (Jacob Tonson the younger) was the great-nephew of the Jacob Tonson the elder and son of Jacob Tonson junior. He carried on the publishing business in the Strand. In 1747 he paid Warburton £500 for editing Shakespeare, and he was eulogised by Steevens [sic] in the advertisement prefixed to his edition of Shakespeare 1778: "he never learned to consider the author as an under-agent to the bookseller . . . His manners were soft and his conversation delicate," but he reserved his acquaintance for a small number. Samuel Johnson spoke of him as "the late amiable Mr. Tonson."

In 1750 he was High Sheriff of Surrey, and in 1759 he paid the fine for being excused serving the same office for the city of London and county of Middlesex. There is a story of his having twice helped Henry Fielding when that writer was unable to pay his taxes. Tonson died on 31 March 1767, without issue, in a house on the north side of the Strand, near Catherine Street, whither he had removed the business some years earlier. His will was made in 1763. In 1775 letters of administration of the goods of Jacob Tonson, left unadministered by Richard Tonson, were granted to William Baker, esq. (M.P. for Hertfordshire), and in 1823, Baker having failed to administer, letters of administration were granted to Joseph Rogers.

== Richard Tonson ==
Richard Tonson (died 1772), the third Jacob Tonson's brother, who took little part in the concerns of the business, lived at Water Oakley, near Windsor, where he built a room for the Kit-Cat portraits. His benevolence and hospitality made him popular, and in 1747 he was elected MP for Wallingford, and in 1768 MP for New Windsor. In some correspondence with the Duke of Newcastle in 1767, the duke spoke of his old friendship with Richard Tonson, "the heir of one I honoured and loved, and have passed many most agreeable hours with." Richard Tonson died on 9 October 1772.

Besides the papers at Bayfordbury, there is a considerable collection of Tonson papers in the British Museum, some relating to business and some to private matters; but many of them are damaged or fragmentary.
