= Hailes Castle =

14th c. Scottish castle

- Near East Linton, East Lothian, Scotland; NT574757
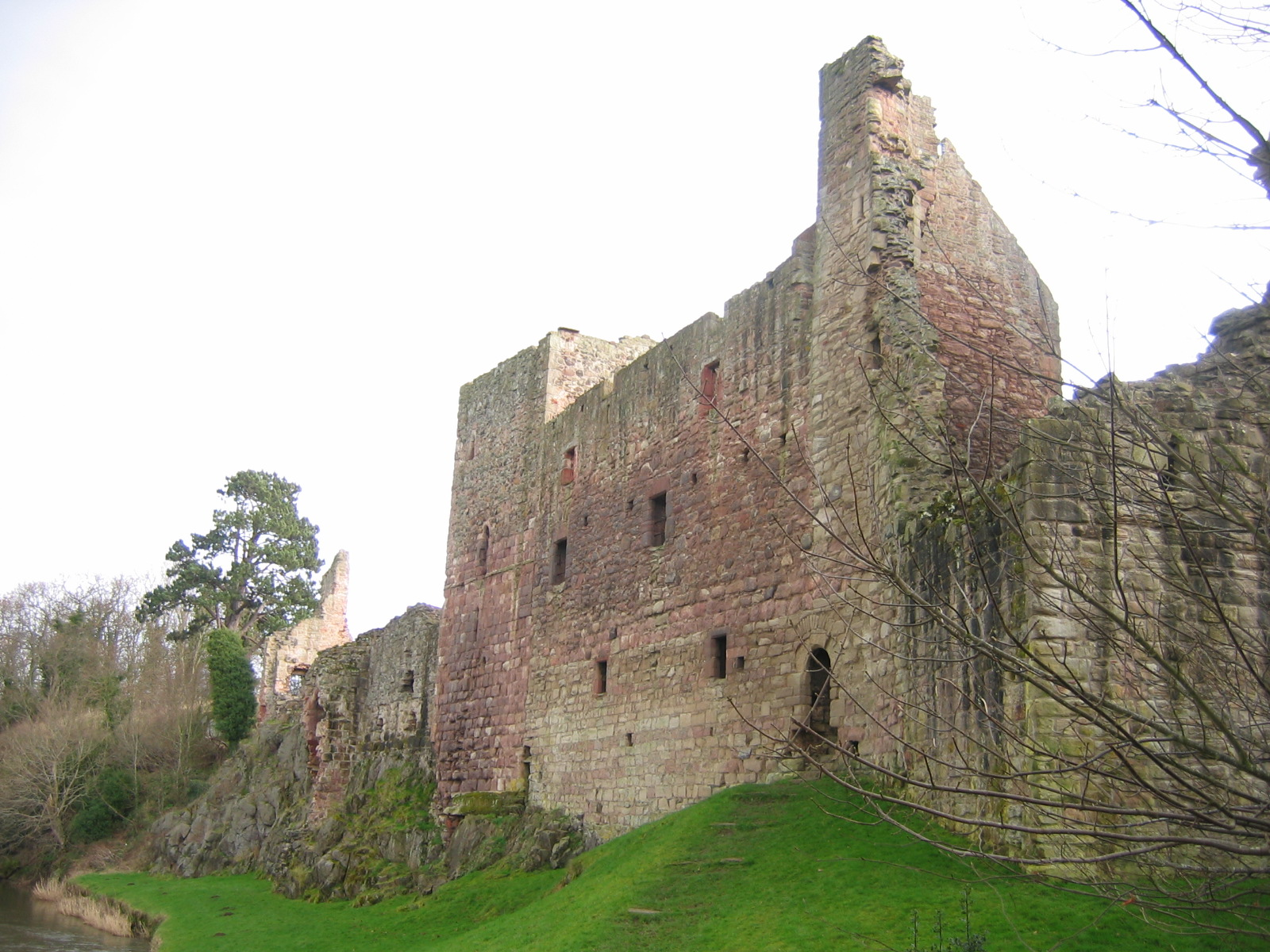
- North front of Hailes Castle, as seen from the River Tyne.

Site information
- Owner: Historic Scotland (as Guardian)
- Controlled by: Hepburn family, originally Malin family, current owner
- Condition: Ruin

Location
- The castle within East Lothian
- Coordinates: 55.97239°N 2.68412°W

Site history
- Built: 13th to 16th centuries
- Built by: Hugo de Gourlay
- Materials: Stone

Hailes Castle is a mainly 14th century castle about a mile and a half south-west of East Linton, East Lothian, Scotland. This castle, which has a fine riverside setting, belonged to the Hepburn family during the most important centuries of its existence. Since 1926, it has been the subject of a state-sponsored guardianship agreement, which is now under the auspices of Historic Environment Scotland as a scheduled monument.

The land adjacent to the castle is open to the public without charge. However, since 2020 access to the inside of the castle itself has been closed off with high security fencing due to safety issues.

== Proprietors ==
The castle was founded as a fortified tower house by Hugo de Gourlay before 1300, making it one of the oldest constructions of its kind in Scotland. The superiority of the lands was held by the Earls of Dunbar and March. The de Gourlays, a Northumbrian family, supported the English in the Wars of Independence, and their land was forfeited by order of the Scottish Crown. Hailes Castle and lands were then confirmed upon another Northumbrian, Sir Adam de Hepburn (d. before 1371), who, in the reign of David II, had a charter of the lands of Traprain, and Southalls and Northalls (now united and called Hailes) in Haddingtonshire, as well as the lands of Mersingtoun, Cockburnspath, and Rollanstoun in Berwickshire.

On 20 December 1451, Sir Patrick Hepburn, 1st Lord Hailes, had a Crown charter of the Lordship of Hailes and other lordships and lands, which his predecessors formerly held in heritage of the Earls of March, who again held them of the Crown in chief; also the lands of Prendergast, above Ayton, and others in the sheriffdom of Berwick, with all rights in the lands formerly held by George Dunbar, Earl of March, and forfeited by him: the whole erected into a free barony to be called the Barony of Hailes. He was one of the conservators of truces with England in 1449, 1451-7 and 1459. It is thought that Sir Patrick Hepburn dramatically extended the castle. A massive tower of at least four storeys was built to the west of the original construction, and a lower tower to the East to form a long north range, looming above the River Tyne. The thick curtain wall of the castle may date back to the 13th century.

Following a visit to Whitekirk, James IV came to Hailes Castle on 19 October 1507 and gave a "drinksilver" tip to masons working on the building.

The castle was put up for sale by auction in April 2024.

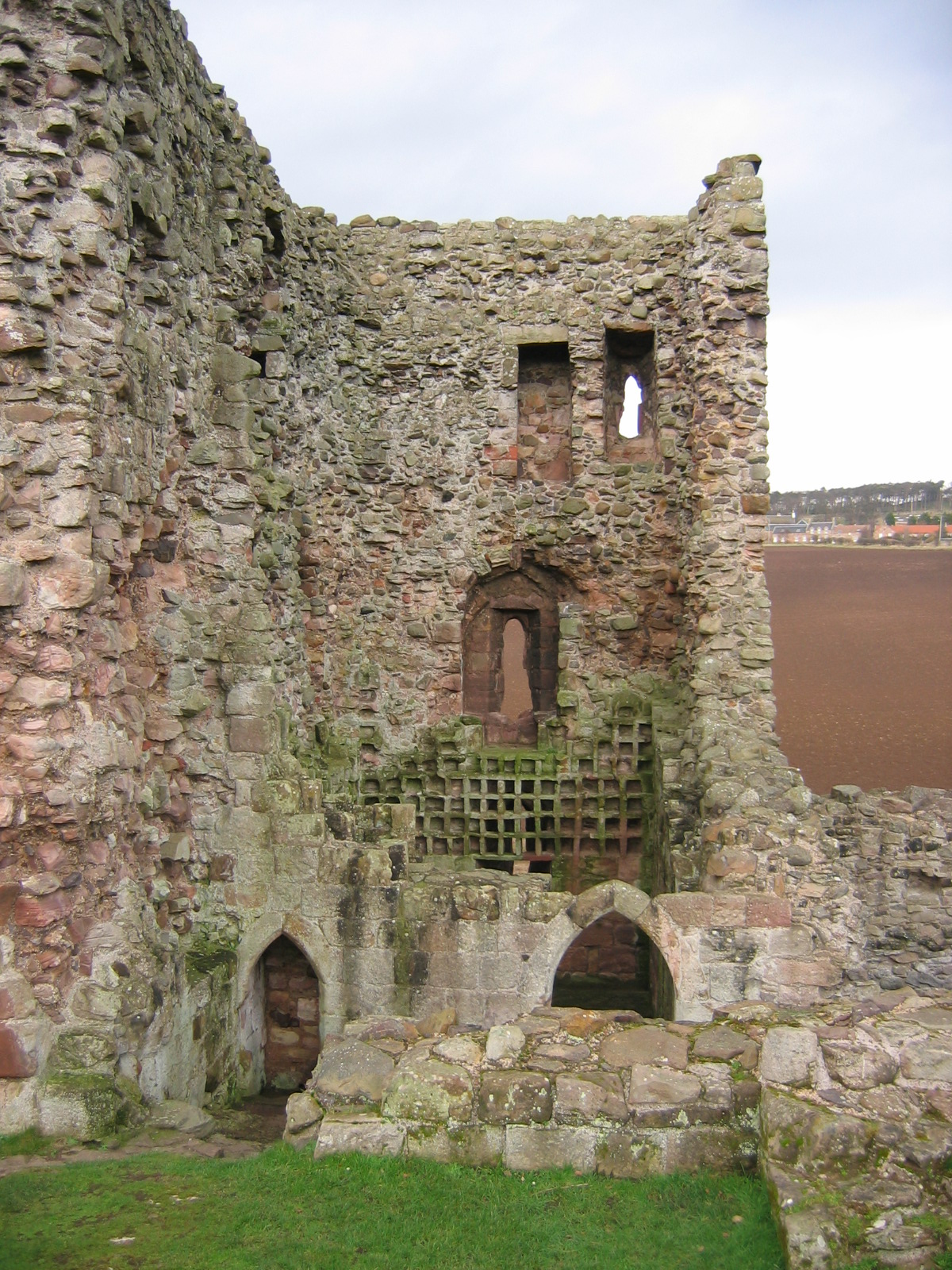
The east tower at Hailes Castle

== Sieges ==
In 1400 it successfully withstood an attack from Harry Hotspur Percy, in league with the Earl of March. The attackers were defeated afterwards in a counter-attack led by Archibald, Master of Douglas. A successful attack by Archibald Dunbar in 1443 was followed by a massacre of the castle’s inhabitants.

In July 1547, during the war of the Rough Wooing, John Lord Borthwick was made keeper of the 'place and fortalice of Halis.' He undertook to keep it 'surlie fra our auld ynemies of Ingland and all uthairis.' He agreed only to render the house to Regent Arran, and not to the Earl of Bothwell or any of the Hepburn name. If the English came, Arran promised to send 24 horsemen to defend the castle. After the battle of Pinkie, Lord Grey of Wilton occupied it for the English. He took possession on 21 February 1548 and wrote, "the house is for the bigness of such excellent beauty within, as I have seldom seen any England except the King's Majesty's, and of very good strength. Hugh Douglas of Longniddry became the keeper in English pay. Arran retook the castle and slighted it by removing the iron gates or yetts in August 1548.

James Hepburn, 4th Earl of Bothwell gave the nearby property of Nether Hailes to his wife Jean Gordon in June 1566. He entertained Mary, Queen of Scots, at Hailes Castle in 1567, shortly before the battle of Carberry Hill. All his lands, including Hailes Castle, were later forfeited to the Scottish Crown.

Oliver Cromwell partly slighted the building in 1650 after the battle of Dunbar. It later passed into the hands of the Stewarts, the Setons, and finally, in 1700, the Dalrymple of Hailes family. By the mid-19th century the castle was being used as a granary, Sir David Dalrymple, Bt., having taken advantage of the more settled times to move his family to the mansion of Newhailes.

== Description ==
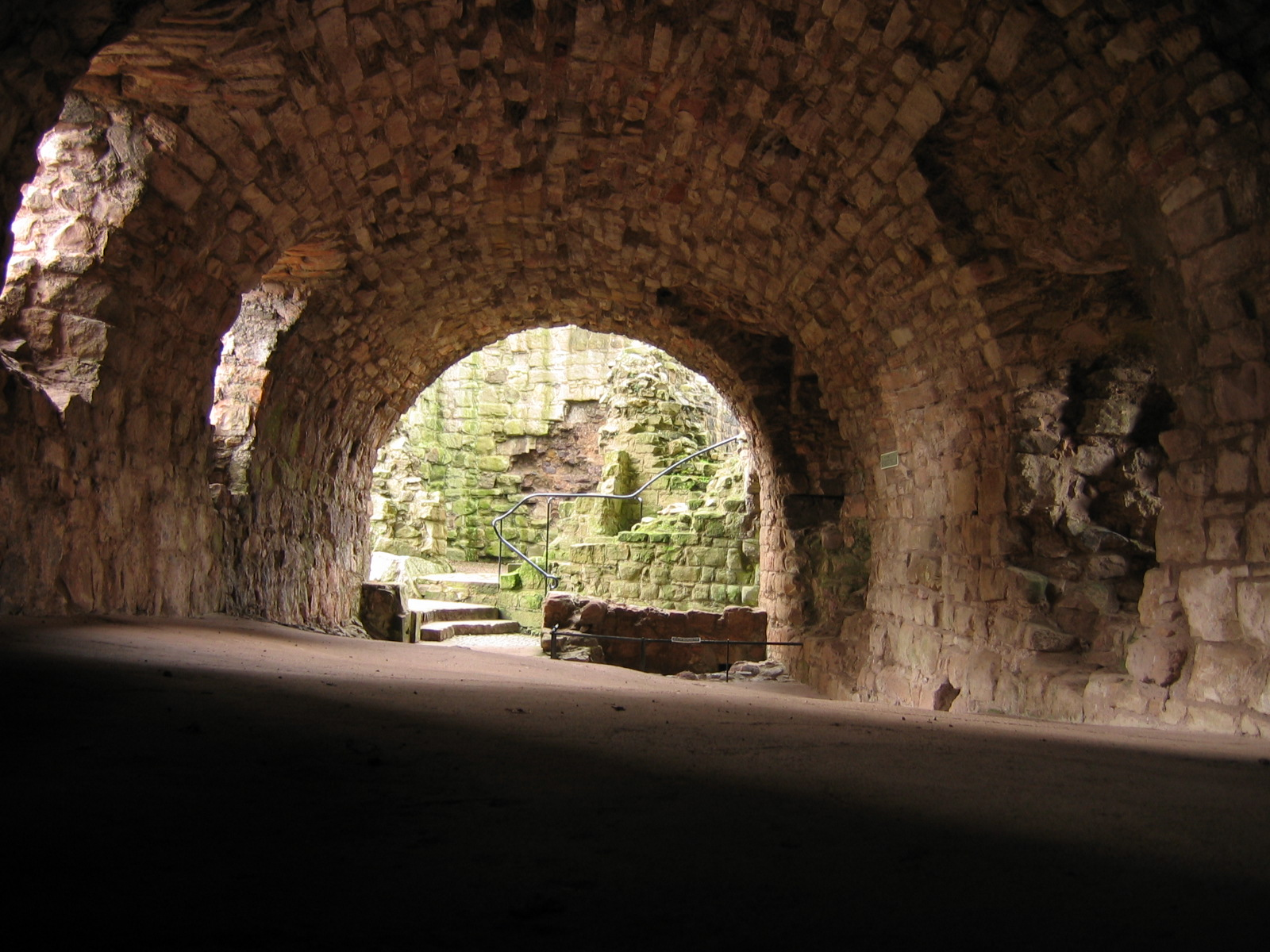
The vaulted cellar beneath the 15th century range

The castle stands on a promontory on the Scottish River Tyne, blocking its strategic route, and preying on the route to Edinburgh.

Within the 13th century curtain wall is the 14th century keep, to which ranges were added in the next two centuries. The major remaining works is the West Tower, a square donjon, which dwarfs the remains of the central tower that the Gourlays built, probably a rebuilding on the 16th century.

Fifteenth century work includes a roofless chamber in which the remains of what appear to be an ambry and a piscina suggest it was a chapel rather than a hall. There is also a vaulted basement bakehouse and brewhouse from this period.

The original tower was used as a dovecot after it ceased to be occupied. Of the East Tower, only a finger of stonework remains.
