= Hercules Robertson, Lord Benholme =

Scottish judge

Hercules James Robertson, Lord Benholme (13 October 1795 – 15 September 1874) was a Scottish judge. He became a Senator of the College of Justice in 1853.

== Life ==
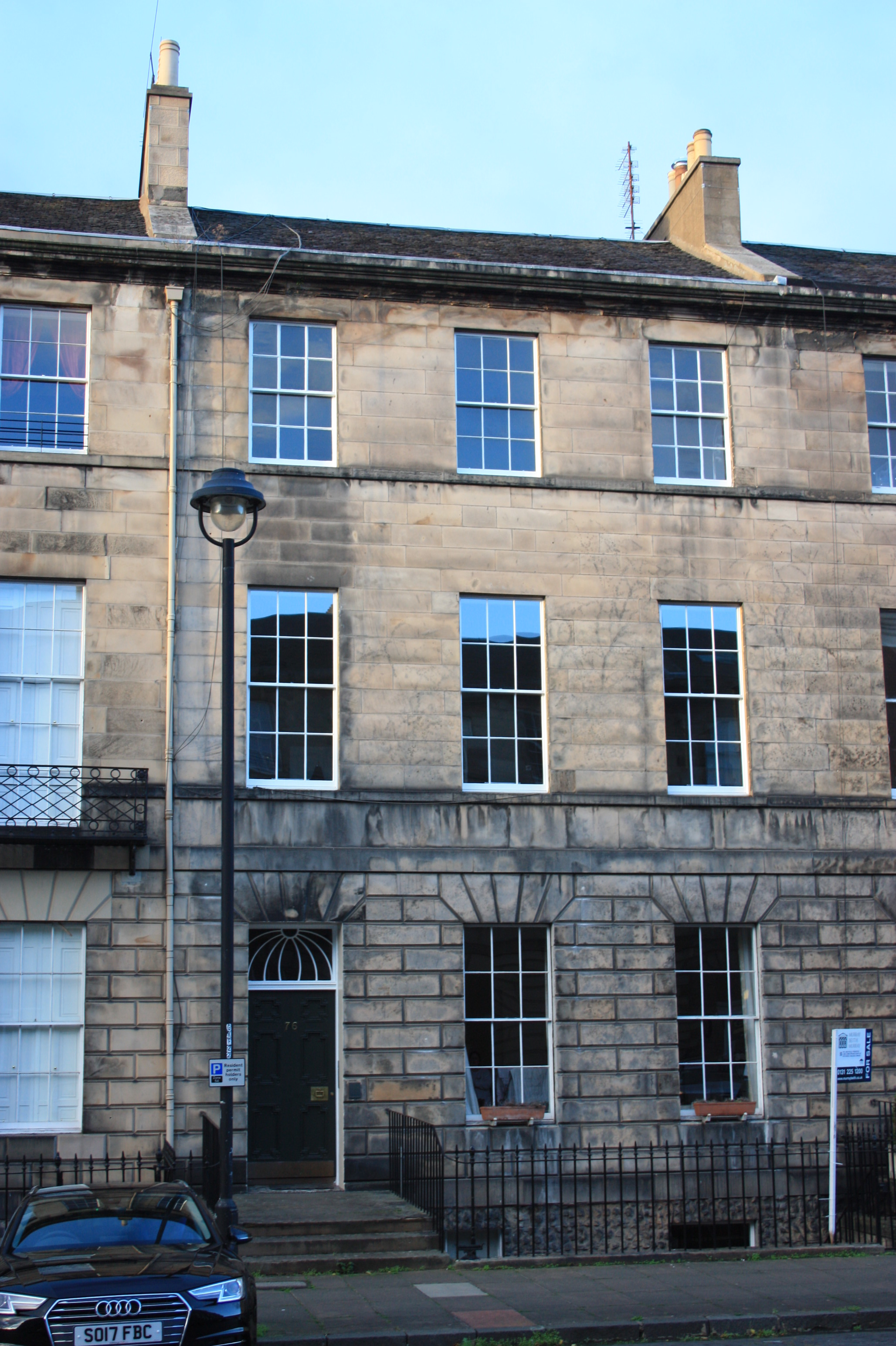
76 Great King Street, Edinburgh

Born in Edinburgh, he was the son of George Robertson – Scott and his wife Isabella Scott.

Robertson was educated at the High School and then studied law at the University of Edinburgh. He was called to the Scottish bar in 1817. Robertson was Sheriff of Renfrewshire in 1842 and was appointed a Lord of Session in December 1853 assuming the judicial title Lord Benholme, after his mother's family seat.

He lived with his family at 76 Great King Street, a very large Georgian townhouse in Edinburgh's Second New Town.

He died in Edinburgh on 15 September 1874.

== Family ==
On 7 July 1829, he married Ann Wilhelmina Hope (died 1842), the daughter of Charles Hope, Lord Granton. They had four sons and two daughters.

His son David Robertson became a minister and married Eleanor Charlotte Dalrymple-Fergusson, daughter of Sir Charles Dalrymple Fergusson, 5th Baronet of Kilkerran.

His son George Robertson (1830–1896) became a civil engineer in charge of the expansion of Leith Docks. He was a Fellow of the Royal Society of Edinburgh and President of the Royal Scottish Society of Arts from 1866 to 1868.

== Arms ==
Coat of arms of Hercules Robertson, Lord Benholme

Crest
A lion's head erased Gules langued Azure.
Escutcheon
Argent three lions' heads erased Gules within a bordure of the second charged with six fleur-de-lys of the first.
Motto
Me Fortem Reddit Deus
