= Alexander Lauder of Blyth =

Sir Alexander Lauder of Blyth, Knt. (died 9 September 1513) was Provost of Edinburgh almost continually from 1500 to 1513. He was Commissioner to the Scottish Parliament, 1504–06, and an Auditor of the Exchequer in Scotland. He appears to have been on terms of intimacy with the King, James IV, with whom he played cards and to whom he occasionally lent money. "He led the men of Edinburgh to join the King's host" at the battle of Flodden, and fell there.

== Family ==
He was the second son of at least four of Sir Alexander Lauder of Haltoun, Knt., who died at Haltoun House, Ratho, Midlothian in July 1507. The Exchequer Rolls mention this Alexander Lauder, Burgess of Edinburgh, with his elder brother Sir George Lauder of Whitslaid, as 'senescallos', or stewards, of Kirkcudbrightshire, 'in their part'.

== Burgess and Provost of Edinburgh ==
On 7 January 1498/9, Alexander Lauder, Burgess of Edinburgh, was one of the witnesses to an Instrument of Resignation by Patrick Hepburn, 1st Earl of Bothwell. Others included Robert, Archbishop of Glasgow, George Hepburn, Provost of Lincluden, William Borthwick, Rector of Whitsome, and Adam Hepburn, burgess of Edinburgh.

Described as son of Sir Alexander Lauder of Hatton [sic], he was granted, as Alexander Lauder, Burgess of Edinburgh, a Letter under The Privy Seal of Scotland on 18 January 1500, of "the custumyre of Edinburgh" including wool, skins, hides, cloth "and all maner of merchandis", for his lifetime.

Whitson states that this Sir Alexander Lauder was Provost from April 1500 till October, or possibly Michaelmas, 1501. He again held that office from Michaelmas 1502 till 1504, and from 1505 to 1513. He is noted also as holding concurrently the office of Justice-Depute with the provostship in 1508 and 1512, if not consecutively. George Touris of Inverleith was appointed caretaker Provost on 19 August 1513, when Lauder left for Flodden.

Lauder and another prominent burgess, William Todrik, were involved in financing the refurbishment of Holyrood Palace before the wedding of James IV of Scotland and Margaret Tudor in 1503.

On 9 May 1505, Julian Laci, the factor of the Italian merchant Jerome Frescobaldi, met with the burgh council of Edinburgh when Richard Lawson was again acting as Provost. Laci signed a deed recording that Alexander Lauder had returned all the goods belonging to Frescobaldi which had been in his custody.

== Landed proprietor ==
He acquired considerable lands. In 1506 he had a charter under the Great Seal of Scotland confirming to him certain lands of Norton in the barony of Ratho, the lands of Brownisfield in the Burgh Muir of Edinburgh, and the lands of Redheuchis in the barony of Colinton.

The Privy Seal records on 19 September 1508, at Edinburgh, "A Lettre [was] maid to Alexander Lauder, provost of Edinburgh, his ayris and assignais: That forsamekly as all and hail the landis of Thirlstane Manys, Ernyscluch, Egrop, Wyndpark, the Heuch, Blyth, Tullois and Simprin, liand in the lordschip of Lauderdale within the schirefdome of Beruik," which had pertained to William Maitland of Lethington, which by the Lords of Council's decree had returned to the King's hands and his father's in non-entry for the space of over thirty years past, in default of entry fees etc being paid; and for the good and thankful service done to His Highness by Alexander Lauder and for other reasonable considerations moving His Grace, he gives, grants and assigns to the said Alexander, his heirs and assignees, all males, all the above lands and fermes, profits etc. etc., to be held of His Highness by charter in due form etc., whereafter he assumed the territorial designation "of Blyth".

== Knight and justice-depute ==
Alexander Lauder of Blyth, Provost of Edinburgh, was knighted before 11 October 1510, when he was described as such, and on which date he endowed a chaplainry in the church of St. Giles. He is on record as an Auditor of the Exchequer in Scotland in 1512.

Pitcairn notes that "Alexander Lauder of Blyth, knight, Provost of Edinburgh and 'Justiciarius deputatis'" signed a verdict at a murder trial on 31 September 1512.

== Marriage and death ==
He married before December 1506 Janet (d. between 1533 and October 1534), daughter and heiress of John Paterson, Burgess of Edinburgh.

The death of Sir Alexander Lauder, Provost of Edinburgh, "slain at Flodden" is recorded in The Exchequer Rolls. As he was a Custumar of Edinburgh, his "relict" Janet Paterson, was, with Margaret Crichton, relict of the other Custumar George Halkerston, allowed the honour of signing off the city's returns to the Exchequer for 1513–1514.
