= Sir Charles Dalrymple Fergusson, 5th Baronet =

Scottish lawyer

Sir Charles Fergusson Bt FRSE
- Born: 26 August 1800; Fort George, Inverness-shire, Scotland
- Died: 18 March 1849 (aged 48); Inveresk, Scotland
- Education: Harrow
- Occupation: lawyer

Sir Charles Dalrymple Fergusson, 5th Baronet of Kilkerran FRSE (26 August 1800 – 18 March 1849) was a Scottish lawyer and landowner in Scotland and Jamaica.

== Life ==
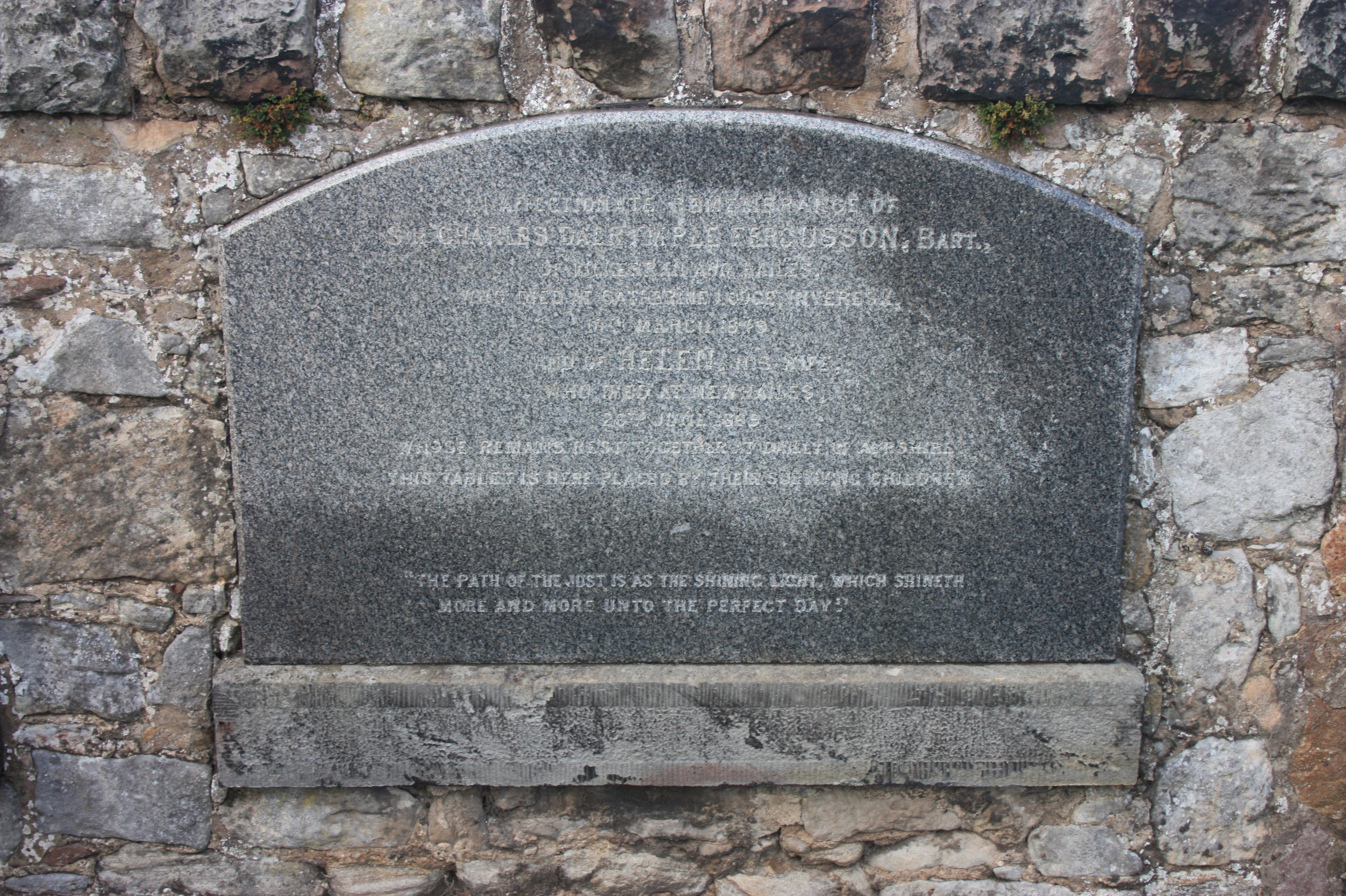
The grave of Sir Charles Dalrymple Ferguson, Inveresk churchyard

He was born at Fort George in Inverness-shire on 26 August 1800.

He was the eldest son of Sir James Fergusson, 4th Baronet, fourth baronet, and his wife Jean Dalrymple, daughter of Sir David Dalrymple, baronet (Lord Hailes). He was educated at Harrow, and became an advocate in 1822, practising at the Scottish bar until his father's death. He was a member of the Speculative Society, and at its meetings read two essays, one on the Origin and Progress of Criminal Jurisprudence, and the other on the History of Painting.

Between August 1824 and November 1825, he temporarily suspended his legal career to complete a grand tour of Northern Europe, Italy and Switzerland, financed in part by his aunt, Miss Christian Dalrymple. Whilst on this tour, he maintained a series of detailed journals containing accounts of his travels; some of these journals have survived, including one at the National Library of Scotland. As well as allowing an unguarded insight into his thoughts and character, these highlight his fascination with the Arts, architecture, religion, and with the people and cultures he encountered.

Fergusson was an active promoter of almost every scheme of usefulness throughout Scotland. The county of Ayr, in which his seat was, was especially indebted to his active aid in its agricultural, charitable, and religious institutions. He was the originator of the Ayrshire Educational Association, and, at his own expense, built many schools and churches in Scotland.

He and his father received compensation in 1836 for the 198 enslaved people emancipated in 1834–1838 on the estate in Jamaica that they co-owned with Sir David Hunter-Blair, 3rd Baronet. His great-great-great grandson, Alex Renton, writes that there is no record of Sir Charles building any churches or schools in Jamaica.

He was returned to the general assembly of the church of Scotland, as a lay representative for Ayr. He did much towards extending the usefulness and efficiency of the church, and in the sittings of its legislative body his counsels had great weight. A decided conservative in his political principles, both in church and state, Fergusson was yet strongly averse to the strife and turmoil of political life, and was remarkably tolerant in his sentiments. Although repeatedly urged by his friends, he could never be induced to seek election for his native county. To the last he was an able and zealous supporter of the cause of protection. Himself a colonial proprietor, he severely condemned the free trade legislation of Sir Robert Peel, which he believed must have an injurious effect upon the British colonies.

In 1829, he was elected a Fellow of the Royal Society of Edinburgh. His proposer was Norwich Duff.

In 1837, Fergusson succeeded to the estates of his grandfather, Lord Hailes, in East and Mid Lothian, and in 1838 to those of his father in Ayrshire, on which he constantly lived. He inherited Newhailes, and the Lordship and Barony of Hailes in 1839, on the death of his aunt, Miss Christian Dalrymple (when he also assumed the additional surname of Dalrymple).

He died at Inveresk 18 March 1849. The grave lies in the extreme north-west corner of the first Victorian extension, west of the original churchyard.

== Family ==
Fergusson married Helen, daughter of the David Boyle, lord-justice-general of Scotland, by whom he had nine children:

- Elizabeth Fergusson (born 11 June 1830)
- Sir James Fergusson of Kilkerran, 6th Baronet (18 March 1832 – 14 January 1907)
- Helen Anne Fergusson (born 11 December 1834)
- David Boyle Fergusson (born 11 July 1836)
- Sir Charles Dalrymple, 1st Baronet (15 October 1839 – 20 June 1916)
- Mary Dalrymple-Fergusson (died 3 January 1916) – married to Walter Severn and mother of Sir Claud Severn, Colonial Secretary of Hong Kong (1912–1925)
- John Adam Dalrymple-Fergusson (7 May 1845 – 5 December 1920)
- Henrietta Duncan Dalrymple-Fergusson (died 12 December 1937)
- Eleanor Charlotte Dalrymple-Fergusson – married Rev David Robertson, son of Hercules Robertson, Lord Benholme

== Legacy ==
His Ayrshire tenants raised a monument to his memory. Fergusson's estate of Hailes in Haddingtonshire and Mid Lothian descended to his second son, Charles, who assumed the name of Dalrymple, as representing his great-grandfather, Sir David Dalrymple, 1st Baronet, (Lord Hailes), but the baronetcy of Hailes was extinct. In the title and estates of Fergusson of Kilkerran, Fergusson was succeeded by his eldest son, Sir James Fergusson, 6th Baronet, M.P., sometime governor, successively, of South Australia, New Zealand, and Bombay, and subsequently under-secretary of state for foreign affairs, to which he was appointed in August 1886.

== Succession boxes ==
Baronetage of Nova Scotia
| Preceded by James Fergusson | Baronet (of Kilkerran); 1838–1849 | Succeeded by James Fergusson |
Scottish feudal lordship
| Preceded by Miss Christian Dalrymple | Lord and Baron of Hailes; 1839–1849 | Succeeded by Sir Charles Dalrymple |
