= Sir Charles Dalrymple, 1st Baronet =

British politician

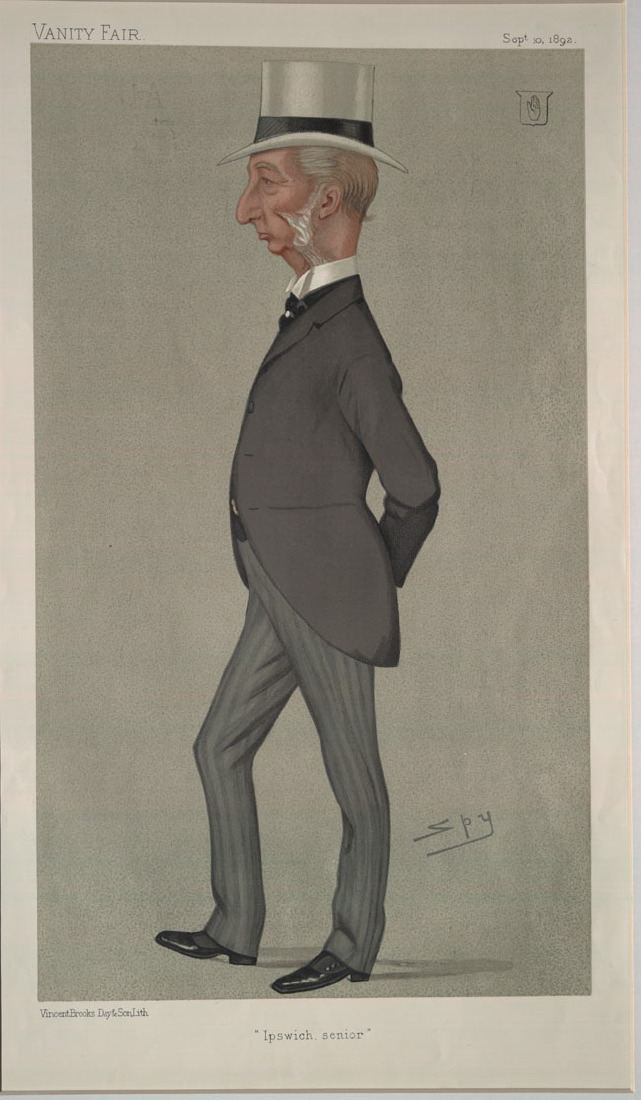
"Ipswich senior". Caricature by Spy published in Vanity Fair in 1892

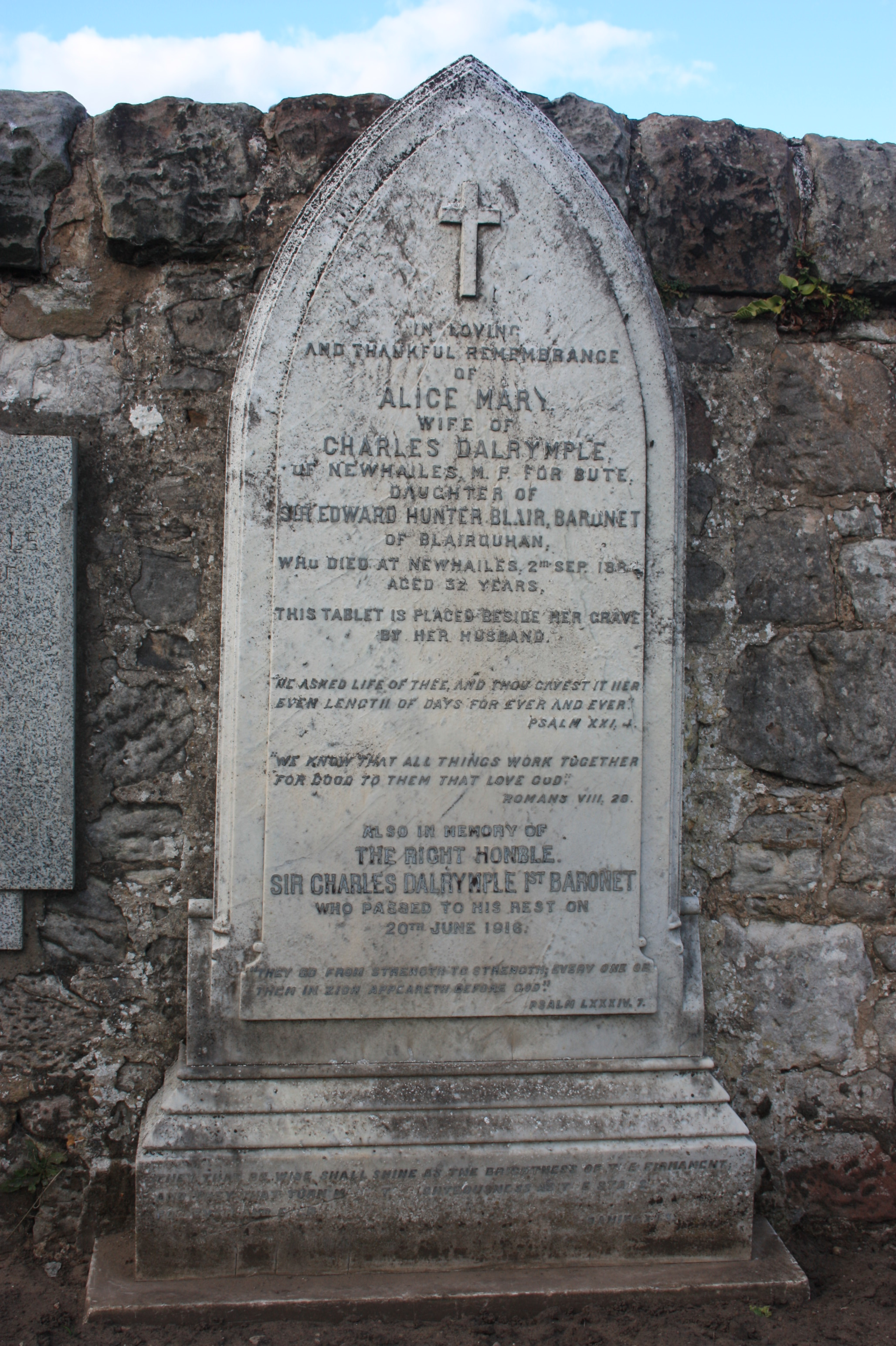
The grave of Sir Charles Dalrymple, baronet, Inveresk Churchyard

Sir Charles Dalrymple, 1st Baronet, PC, DL, JP (15 October 1839 – 20 June 1916) was a Scottish Conservative politician.

== Life ==
Born Charles Fergusson, he was the second surviving son of Sir Charles Dalrymple Fergusson, 5th Baronet, and grandson of Sir James Fergusson, 4th Baronet, and his wife Jean, daughter of David Dalrymple, Lord Hailes. Sir James Fergusson, 6th Baronet, was his elder brother. On the death of his father in 1849 he assumed the surname of Dalrymple in lieu of Fergusson. He was educated at Harrow School and Trinity College, Cambridge, graduating with third-class honours in classics. He was called to the bar at Lincoln's Inn in 1865. In 1849 he assumed the surname Dalrymple in lieu of his patronymic in accordance with the will of his great-grandfather David Dalrymple, Lord Hailes

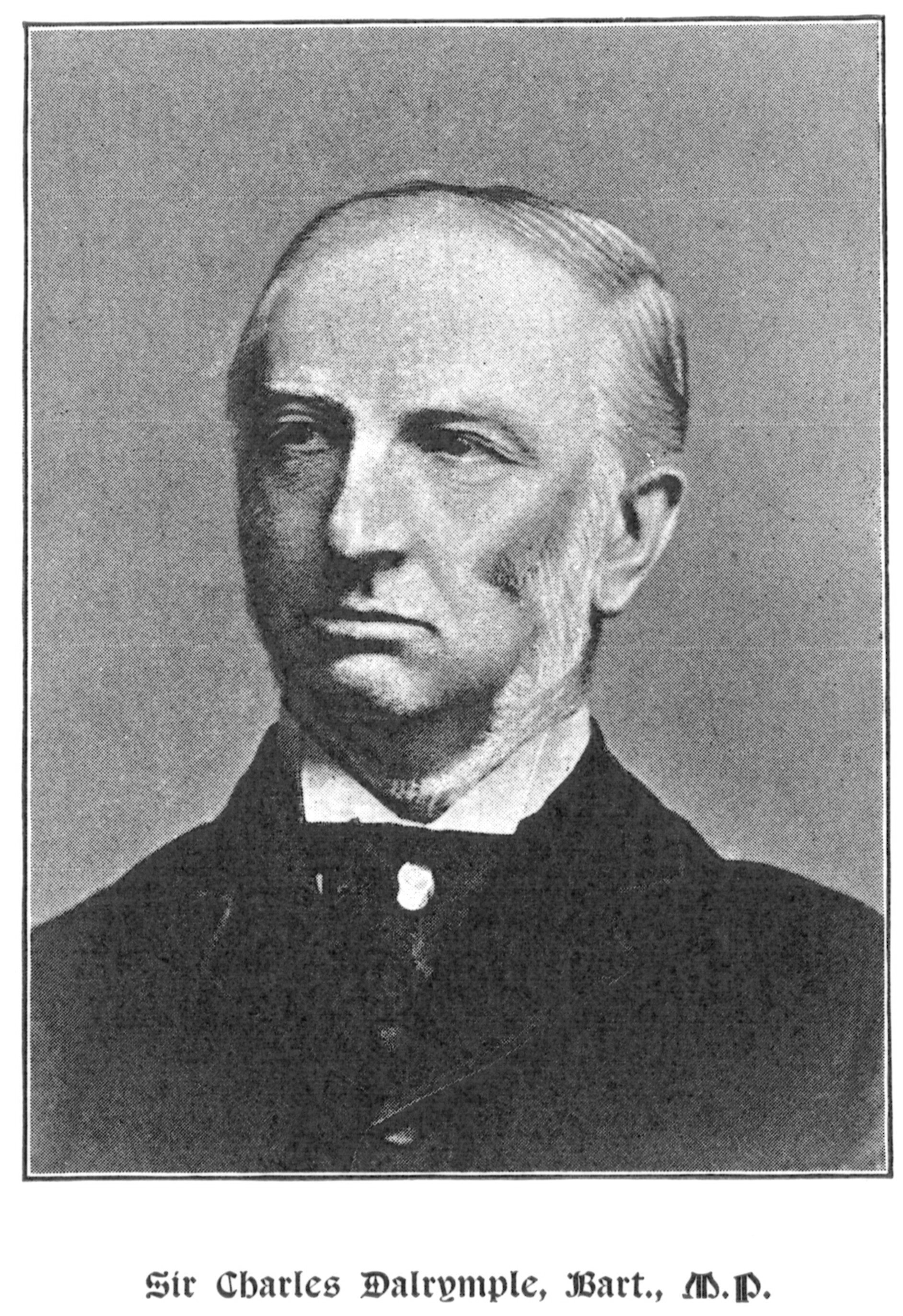
Pictured in Suffolk Celebrities, 1893

He was a Justice of the Peace and Deputy Lieutenant for East Lothian, and a JP for Midlothian and Ayrshire, and a captain in the Prince Regent's Ayr and Wigtown Militia. His seat was at Newhailes, Musselburgh.

He entered Parliament for Buteshire in 1868, a seat he held, with a brief interruption from April to July 60, until 1885, and later represented Ipswich from 1886 to 1906. He was created a baronet, of New Hailes in the County of Midlothian, in 1887, and sworn of the Privy Council, in 1905.

From 1894 to 1896 he was Grand Master of the Freemasons in Scotland.

Dalrymple died on 20 June 1916, aged 76. He is buried in Inveresk churchyard. The grave lies in the north-west corner of the first Victorian cemetery extension, west of the main churchyard.

== Family ==
He was married to Alice Mary Hunter Blair (1850–1889) daughter of Sir Edward Hunter Blair, 4th Baronet. They had three children, Christian Elizabeth Louisa (later Dumaresq) (1875–1932), David Charles Herbert, (1879–1932) and Alice Mary (1884–1959).

Their son, Lt Cmdr David Charles Herbert Dalrymple (1879–1932), inherited the estates when he became 2nd baronet.

Parliament of the United Kingdom
Preceded by James Lamont	Member of Parliament for Buteshire; 1868–1880	Succeeded by Thomas Russell
Preceded by Thomas Russell	Member of Parliament for Buteshire; 1880–1885	Succeeded by James Robertson
Preceded by Jesse Collings; Henry Wyndham West	Member of Parliament for Ipswich; 1886–1906; With: Lord Elcho 1886–1895; Sir Daniel Ford Goddard 1895–1906	Succeeded by Sir Daniel Ford Goddard; Felix Cobbold
Masonic offices
Preceded by The Earl of Haddington	Grand Master of the Grand Lodge of Scotland; 1893–1897	Succeeded by The Lord Saltoun
Baronetage of the United Kingdom
New creation	Baronet (of New Hailes); 1887–1916	Succeeded by David Dalrymple
Scottish feudal lordship
Preceded by Sir Charles Dalrymple Fergusson	Lord and Baron of Hailes; 1849–1876	Succeeded by Arthur Balfour
