= Walter Severn =

English painter

Walter Severn (12 October 1830 – 22 September 1904), professionally a civil servant, was known as an English water-colour artist.

== Life ==
Severn was born in Frascati, near Rome, the eldest son of Joseph Severn and his wife Elizabeth, daughter of Archibald, Lord Montgomerie. His brother Arthur became a landscape painter; his sister Ann Mary became a portrait painter, and married the archaeologist Charles Thomas Newton. Walter was sent in 1843 with his brother Arthur to Westminster School, and from an early age showed a fondness for art.

In 1852 he entered the Civil Service, and was for thirty-three years an officer in the education department. Meanwhile, he took a lively interest in varied branches of art. In 1857, with his friend Charles Eastlake, he started the making of art furniture. In 1865 he made a vigorous effort to resuscitate the almost forgotten craft of art needlework and embroidery, for skill in which he earned medals in South Kensington and much encouragement from John Ruskin.

His leisure was chiefly devoted to landscape painting in water-colours. Fifty of his water-colours were exhibited in 1874 at Agnew's Gallery in Bond Street. The most popular of his works, Our Boys, circulated widely in an engraving. He made illustrations for Lord Houghton's poem Good Night and Good Morning in 1859; he illustrated The Golden Calendar (c.1864) and The Order for Morning and Evening Prayer (1873).

=== Dudley Gallery Art Society ===
In 1865 Severn instituted the Dudley Gallery Art Society. The Old Water Colour Society had lately rejected his brother Arthur when he applied for membership. The Institute of Painters in Water Colours also seemed to Severn too exclusive. He accordingly called a meeting of fifty artists at his brother's house, when Tom Taylor, art critic of The Times, took the chair, and the Dudley Gallery Art Society was the outcome. Exhibitions were held annually at the Egyptian Hall in Piccadilly until its demolition in 1909, when they were continued in the new building erected on the site of the hall. The artists who sent pictures included Albert and Henry Moore, George Dunlop Leslie, Edward Burne-Jones, and George Frederic Watts.

The merit of the Dudley Society's exhibitions led the Institute of Painters in Water Colours in 1883 to elect several of its members en bloc, including Severn's brother Arthur, but not himself. Severn was elected president of the Dudley Society in 1883, and held office until his death on 22 September 1904 at Earl's Court Square.

== Family ==
He married in 1866 Mary Dalrymple, daughter of Sir Charles Dalrymple Fergusson, 5th Baronet, and they had five sons and one daughter. Their son Claud Severn became a colonial administrator.
