= Auditor of the Exchequer in Scotland =

Scottish public official

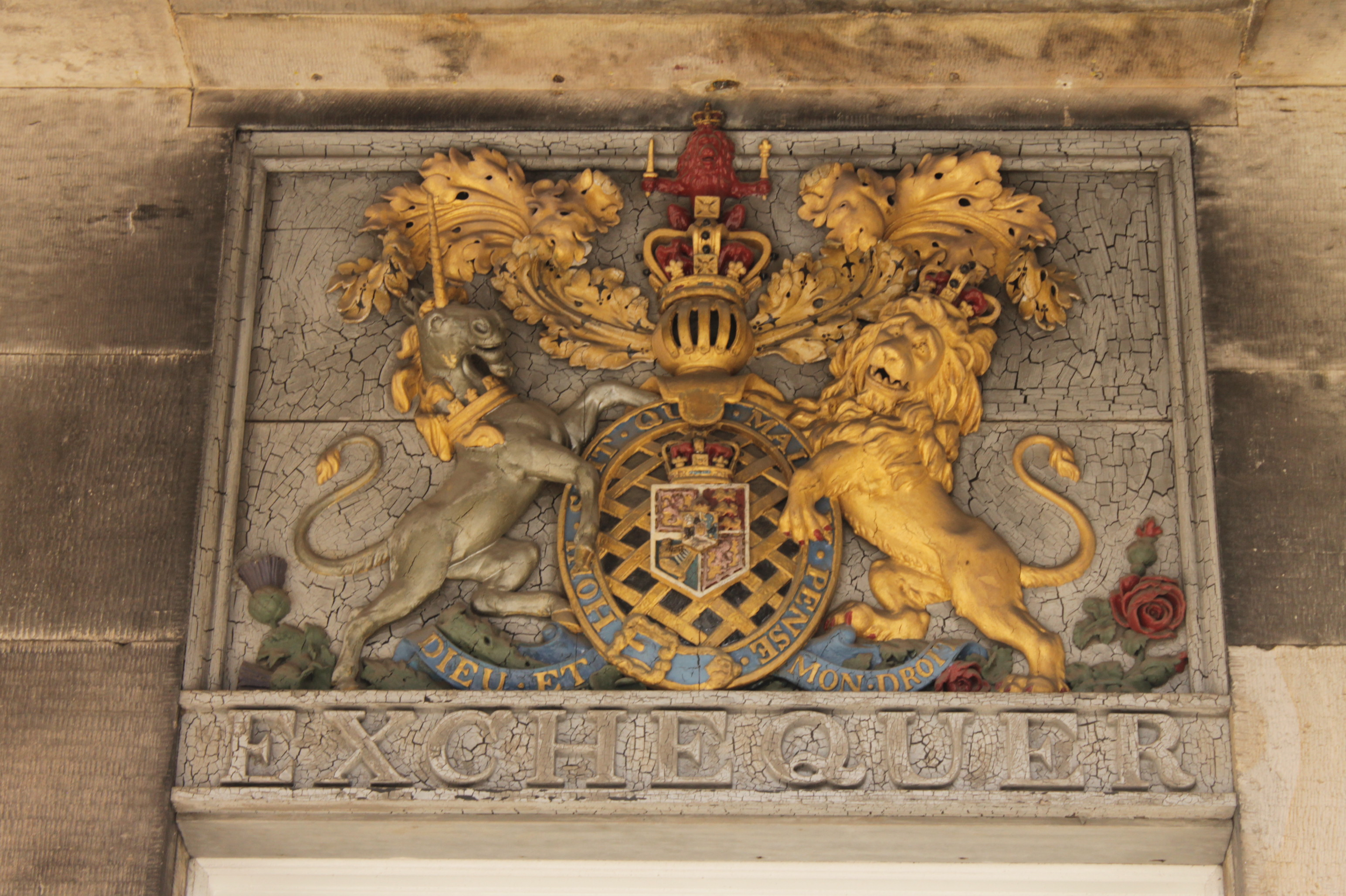
Armorial panel from Scottish Exchequer, Parliament Square, Edinburgh

The Scottish Exchequer had a similar role of auditing and deciding on royal revenues as in England. It was not until 1584 that it also became a court of law, separate from the King's Privy Council. Even then, the judicial and administrative roles never became completely separated into two bodies, as with the English Exchequer. The Auditor of the Exchequer played a pivotal role in this important office of state.

== Early notices ==
The earliest surviving mention of a public official charged with auditing government expenditure is a reference to the Auditor of the Exchequer in 1314. John Barbour, author of The Bruce, was, in 1373, one of the Auditors of the Exchequer of Scotland. About 1430 "Roberto de Lawedre de Edrington, militi," was an Auditor of Exchequer and between 1425 and 1433 he was Governor of Edinburgh Castle. Sir David Murray of Tullibardine (d.c1451) was Auditor of the Exchequer in Scotland in 1448. In 1512 Sir Alexander Lauder of Blyth, Provost of Edinburgh, was Auditor of the Exchequer.

== Responsibilities ==
In later centuries the Auditor was responsible for examining and making up all public accounts, except those of Excise, although the Customs accounts also underwent a preliminary examination by the Board's own auditor. Duplicates of the accounts were retained in the Auditor's Office, either in roll form or in a register, the principal rolls being preserved in the Pipe Office. Certain minor accounts of expenditure were not engrossed on rolls and appear only in the Auditor's register. The Auditor had particular responsibility for the accounts of revenues from the Crown lands and bishoprics, the charges against the several receivers and collectors being verified by the rentals preserved in that office.

== After revolution ==
The modern history of this office of Auditor of Exchequer in Scotland commences in 1708 with an Act of Parliament under Queen Anne. It was not expressly established by the Exchequer Court (Scotland) Act 1707 but its existence was implied by section 11 of that Act and the Exchequer was reconstituted into a court on the English model with a Lord Chief Baron of the Exchequer and four ordinary Barons. The court adopted English forms of procedure and had further powers added to it.

On 16 May 1709, John Philp and Robert Arbuthnot received a Crown commission as joint Auditors, without power of deputation. Nine years later, however, on 1 July 1718, Sir James Dalrymple, 2nd Baronet of Hailes (1692–1751), father of David Dalrymple, Lord Hailes, was appointed Principal Auditor of the Exchequer, with Philp and Arbuthnot as his deputies.

According to Clerk and Scrope, "There are in this Office an Auditor-General and Depute-Auditor, both having commissions from the King. The first is an Office of great name and salary; but the business of the Office is entirely in the last, as is the case at present in the Auditor's Office" (p. 283). In fact, the office of Principal Auditor remained a sinecure throughout its existence. Even the power of deputation could not be exercised until 1776, as the commissions to the Principal Auditors expressly reserved the rights of Philp and Arbuthnot, and later of William Alston, who was appointed joint Deputy-Auditor with the former in 1757 and held office until his death on 5 April 1775.

On 28 February 1795, the Hon. George Murray received a commission as Principal Auditor, to take effect on the death or resignation of the then holder of the office, James Townsend Oswald, whom he accordingly succeeded in January 1814.

In the Official Reports on Finances within the government of the UK in 1817, the first Report from the Select committee (Vol. IV, 19p. Sessional no. 159, Chairman, Nicolson Calvert) was "to inquire into, and state, the income and expenditure of the United Kingdom, for the year ended the 5th of January 1817, and also to consider and state the probable income and expenditure ... for the years ending the 5th January 1818 and the 5th January, 1819, respectively ... and also to consider what further measures may be adopted for the relief of the country from any part of the said expenditure, without detriment to the public interest."

The committee recommended the abolition of a number of offices in Scotland, i.e. the Governor and other officers in the Mint, the Receiver General of Bishop's Rents, Auditor of the Exchequer, Assistant Surveyor General of Taxes, Comptroller General of Customs, the three Inspectors of Wheel Carriages, Gazette Writer and the Inspector General of Roads.

Although section 11 of the Public Offices (Scotland) Act 1817 directed that the office should be "regulated" after the termination of the existing interest, the provision remained inoperative until George Murray's death, on 30 September 1848. From 1 December 1848 the office of Auditor was united with that of the Queen's and Lord Treasurer's Remembrancer, in terms of a Treasury Minute, dated 3 November 1848.

== Notes ==
Robert Arbuthnot (who died in Lord Stair's house in Hanover Square 4 August 1727) was also sometime manager of Lord Stair's business affairs. After his death Dr John Arbuthnot was requested to be present at the opening of his papers "to see if it were worth while for his wife, Elizabeth Arbuthnot, (a daughter of James Carnegie of Craigo) who was then in Scotland, to administer to him" (i.e.: be executor of his estate).

== See also ==
- Exchequer Rolls of Scotland
- "National Archives of Scotland". Archived from the original on 28 September 2007.
- "Payments into the Exchequer, fees and duties of offices: Auditors of the Exchequer".
