= Robert Arbuthnot (auditor) =

Robert Arbuthnot, Auditor of the Exchequer in Scotland, (1669 in Inverbervie – 4 August 1727 in London) was also sometime manager of Lord Stair's business affairs.

On 16 May 1709 John Philp and Robert Arbuthnot received a commission from the King as joint Auditors, without power of deputation.

He died in Lord Stair's house in Hanover Square, London.

After his death his brother Dr John Arbuthnot was requested to be present at the opening of his papers "to see if it were worth while for his wife, Elizabeth Arbuthnot, (a daughter of James Carnegie of Craigo) who was then in Scotland, to administer to him" (i.e.: be executor of his estate).

== See also ==
- Arbuthnot, P S-M, Memories of the Arbuthnots, Geo Allen & Unwin Ltd., 1920.
- Chancery Proceedings 1714–58, (235/2).
- Broome, Dorothy M., Auditors of the Foreign Accounts of the Exchequer 1310-27, in The English Historical Review, Vol. 38, No. 149, January 1923, pp. 63–71.
