= Christian Dalrymple =

Miss Christian Dalrymple of New Hailes (30 December 1765 – 9 January 1839) daughter of Anne Brown and David Dalrymple, Lord Hailes. She inherited the Newhailes estate in East Lothian, Scotland, in 1792 (where she lived for 46 years). The title of Baronet passed to her cousin, James Dalrymple, who became 4th baronet, of Hailes. However, the feudal title of Baron of Hailes did pass to Miss Dalrymple. Miss Dalrymple did not marry. Her estate of Newhailes and the Lordship and Barony of Hailes descended to her nephew Sir Charles Dalrymple Fergusson.

As a possible explanation for why she never married, the 1868 edition of Robert Chambers's Traditions of Edinburgh (originally published in 1824 when Christian Dalrymple was still alive) includes the following:

"1868 - Now that the grave has for thirty years closed over Miss Dalrymple, it may be allowable to tell that she was of dwarfish and deformed figure, while amiable and judicious above the average of her sex. Taking into view her beautiful place of residence [Newhailes House] and her large wealth, she remarked to a friend one day: 'I can say, for the honour of man, that I never got an offer in my life.' "

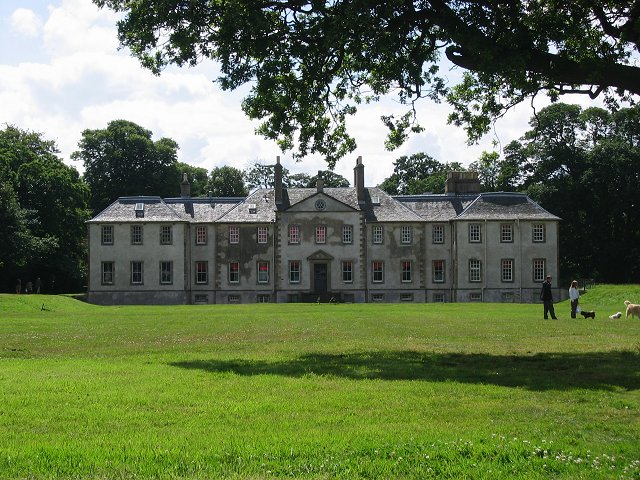
Garden front, Newhailes

== Succession boxes ==
Scottish feudal lordship
Preceded by David Dalrymple, Lord Hailes	Lord and Baron of Hailes; 1792–1839	Succeeded by Sir Charles Dalrymple Fergusson
