= Lord of Hailes =

Title of nobility in the Baronage of Scotland

Lordship of Hailes
- Creation date: 1343
- Creation: Baronage of Scotland
- Created by: David I of Scotland
- First holder: Adam de Hepburn, Baron of Hailes
- Present holder: Sam Malin, Lord of Hailes
- Remainder to: heirs and assignees
- Subsidiary titles: Baron of Hailes; Lord of Hailes
- Status: extant
- Seats: Hailes Castle; Ingress Abbey
- Motto: Evalesco ("I Escape")

Lord of Hailes is a title of nobility in the Baronage of Scotland (a lordship of higher baronial nobility than barony).

Hailes is traditionally believed to have been founded by an Englishman, taken prisoner in the reign of David II of Scotland, who was rewarded with the grant of lands in East Lothian for having rescued the Earl of Dunbar and March from an attacking horse.

Patrick de Dunbar, 9th Earl of March granted the Barony of Hailes to Adam de Hepburn (or Hibburne or Hyburne) in 1343 (thus the Hepburns held Hailes in heritage from the Earl of March, who in turn held it on behalf of the Crown); Hew Gourlay of Beinstoun having earlier forfeited the lands. On 20 December 1451, James II, King of Scots, granted Sir Patrick Hepburn, 1st Lord Hailes, and his heirs and assignees, the lands of the Lordship of Hailes, including Hailes Castle, and other lands, to be incorporated into the free barony of Hailes. Sir Patrick Hepburn was created a peer of the Parliament of Scotland under the title Lord Hailes in 1453.

The Lordship of Hailes remained in the Hepburn family until 20 December 1567 when it was forfeited to the Parliament of Scotland by James Hepburn, 4th Earl of Bothwell. On 1 October 1594, it was granted to Sir Walter Scott, 1st Lord Scott of Buccleuch, remaining with the Scott family until around the time of the Cromwellian invasion of Scotland in 1650 when it came into the possession of the Earls of Winton. In 1692, the Lordship of Hailes was disponed by James Melville of Halhill to Sir David Dalrymple, advocate and remained in the Dalrymple family until 1876 when it was transferred to A.J. Balfour (later created The 1st Earl of Balfour).

The caput baronium (or simply "caput") of the Lordship of Hailes is Hailes Castle.

Today the current lord is Sam Malin, Lord of Hailes.

== Barons of Hailes ==
Holders of the barony in heritage from Patrick de Dunbar, 9th Earl of March, who held it on behalf of the Crown:

Barons of Hailes	Succeeded
Adam de Hepburn	1343
Patrick Hepburn of Hailes	before 1371
Sir Adam Hepburn of Hailes	after 1402
Sir Patrick Hepburn	circa 1446

== Lords of Hailes ==
On 20 Dec 1451, James II, King of Scots, raised the Barony of Hailes into a Lordship for Sir Patrick Hepburn, thereby converting the Barony that had been held in heritage from the Earl of March into a Lordship granted by the King.

Lords of Hailes	Succeeded
Patrick Hepburn, 1st Lord Hailes	20 Dec 1451
Patrick Hepburn, 1st Earl of Bothwell	1483
Adam Hepburn, 2nd Earl of Bothwell	1508
Patrick Hepburn, 3rd Earl of Bothwell	1513
James Hepburn, 4th Earl of Bothwell	1556
Forfeited to Parliament of Scotland	20 Dec 1567
Walter Scott, 1st Lord Scott of Buccleuch	1594
Walter Scott, 1st Earl of Buccleuch	1611
Francis Scott, 2nd Earl of Buccleuch	1633
George Seton, 4th Earl of Winton	circa 1650
James Melville of Halhill	1675
Sir David Dalrymple	1692
Sir James Dalrymple	1721
Sir David Dalrymple	1751
Miss Christian Dalrymple	1792
Sir Charles Dalrymple Fergusson	1839
Sir Charles Dalrymple	1849
Arthur Balfour, 1st Earl of Balfour	1876
Gerald Balfour, 2nd Earl of Balfour	1930
Robert Balfour, 3rd Earl of Balfour	1945
Gerald Balfour, 4th Earl of Balfour^{a}	1968
Samuel Malin, Lord of Hailes	2008

a: From 2003 until 2008, the Lordship of Hailes was held by the estate of the late Gerald Balfour, 4th Earl of Balfour
