= Patrick Hepburn, 1st Lord Hailes =

Scottish feudal lord (died 1483)

Sir Patrick Hepburn of Dunsyre, 1st Lord Hailes (died 1483) was the feudal lord of Hailes and its castle in East Lothian and a Lord of Parliament.

== Family ==
Sir Patrick Hepburn was the son of Sir Adam Hepburn of Hailes, Knt. (d. 1446), by his spouse Janet (her 1st marriage), daughter of William Borthwick, 1st of Borthwick (d. 1414) of that Ilk. On 29 June 1444, he had a charter from William Douglas, 8th Earl of Douglas, of certain lands in the lordship of Dunsyre, Lanarkshire, and was subsequently known by this designation until he became Lord Hailes. A charter dated 20 July 1456 mentions Patrick Hepburn Lord Hailes, and is witnessed by his brothers, William and George Hepburn.

== With the Queen-Dowager ==
Before his father's death in 1446, he took possession of Dunbar Castle, without authority; Joan Beaufort, the Queen-Dowager, resided there for some time while he held it. But after her death there on 15 July 1445 he evacuated the place. On 19 December 1450 he had a charter of the lands of Little Lamberton, commonly called Sherfbygyn, in Berwickshire.

== Inherits Hailes ==
On 20 December 1451 he had a Crown charter of the Lordship of Hailes and other lordships and lands, which his predecessors formerly held in heritage of the Earls of March, who again held them of the Crown in chief; also the lands of Prendergast and others in the sheriffdom of Berwick, with all rights in the lands formerly held by George II, Earl of March, and forfeited by him:- the whole erected into a free barony to be called the feudal barony of Hailes. Between October 1452 and June 1453 he was created a Lord of Parliament as Lord Hailes.

== Borders affairs ==
Patrick was one of the conservators of truces with England in the years 1449, 1451-7 and 1459, was confirmed as Shire-reeve (Sheriff) of Berwickshire on 20 May 1452, and he or his namesake grandson was the last Scottish Keeper & Captain, for less than a year in 1482, of Berwick Castle.

== Heirs ==
He married Ellen Wallace, the daughter of Thomas Wallace of Auchinbothy. They had six sons and three daughters. His grandson Patrick (who would become the first Earl of Bothwell), succeeded him as Lord of Hailes, as his eldest son Adam predeceased him. His son John established Saint Leonards College in Saint Andrews. His daughter, Helen Hepburn, married John Somerville, 3rd Lord Somerville, and had issue.

== See also ==
- List of Provosts of Edinburgh

New title	Lord Hailes c. 1458–1483	Succeeded by Patrick Hepburn
