= Ljubljana Castle =

Coordinates: 46°02′56″N 14°30′30″E

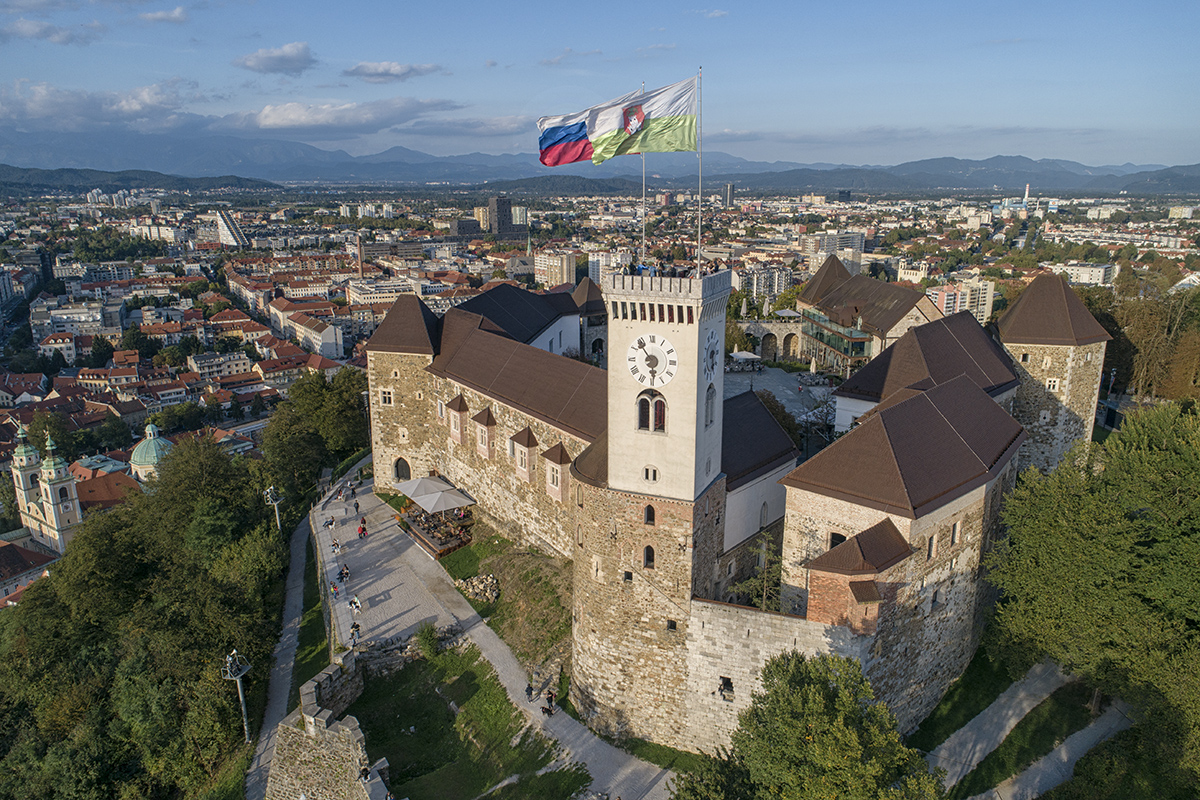

General information
- Location: Ljubljana, Slovenia
- Construction started: 11th century
- Owner: City Hall of Ljubljana

Design and construction
- Other designers: Boris Kobe, Jože Plečnik

Ljubljana Castle (Slovene: Ljubljanski grad, German: Laibacher Schloss) is a castle complex standing on Castle Hill above downtown Ljubljana, the capital of Slovenia. It is a key landmark of the town. Originally a medieval fortress, it was probably constructed in the 11th century and rebuilt in the 12th century. It acquired its present outline with an almost complete overhaul in the 15th century, whereas the majority of the buildings date to the 16th and 17th centuries. Initially a defense structure and since the first half of the 14th century the seat of the lords of Carniola, it was since the early 19th century used for various other purposes and today is used as a major cultural venue.

The castle is depicted on the city's coat of arms, along with a dragon on top.

== History ==
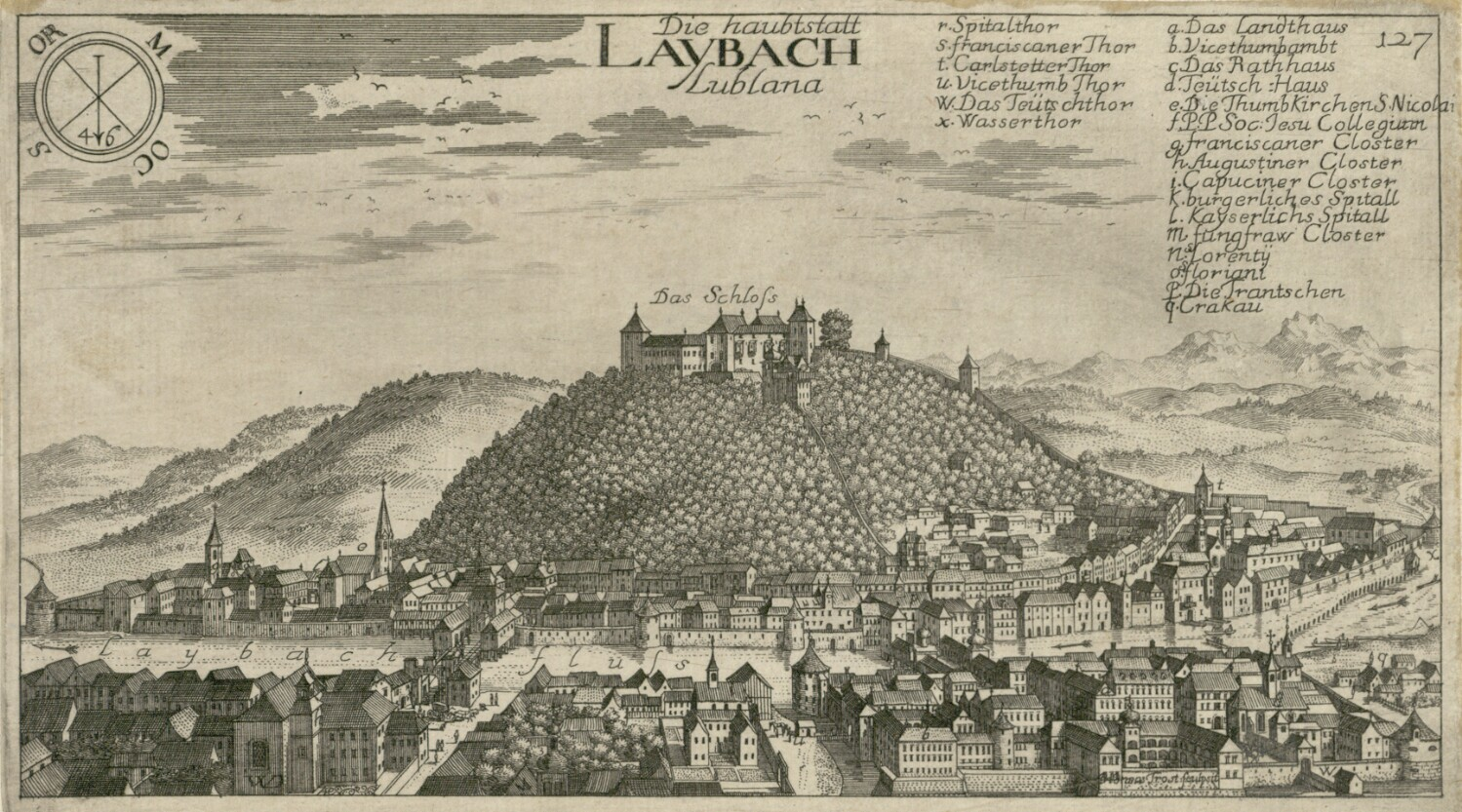
View of Ljubljana and its castle, engraving from Topographia Ducatus Carniolae modernae by Johann Weikhard von Valvasor (1679)

=== Ancient history ===
According to archeological surveys, the area of the present castle has been settled continuously since 1200 BC, when the first settlements and later fortifications were built. The hill summit probably became a Roman army stronghold after fortifications were built in Illyrian and Celtic times.

=== Middle Ages ===
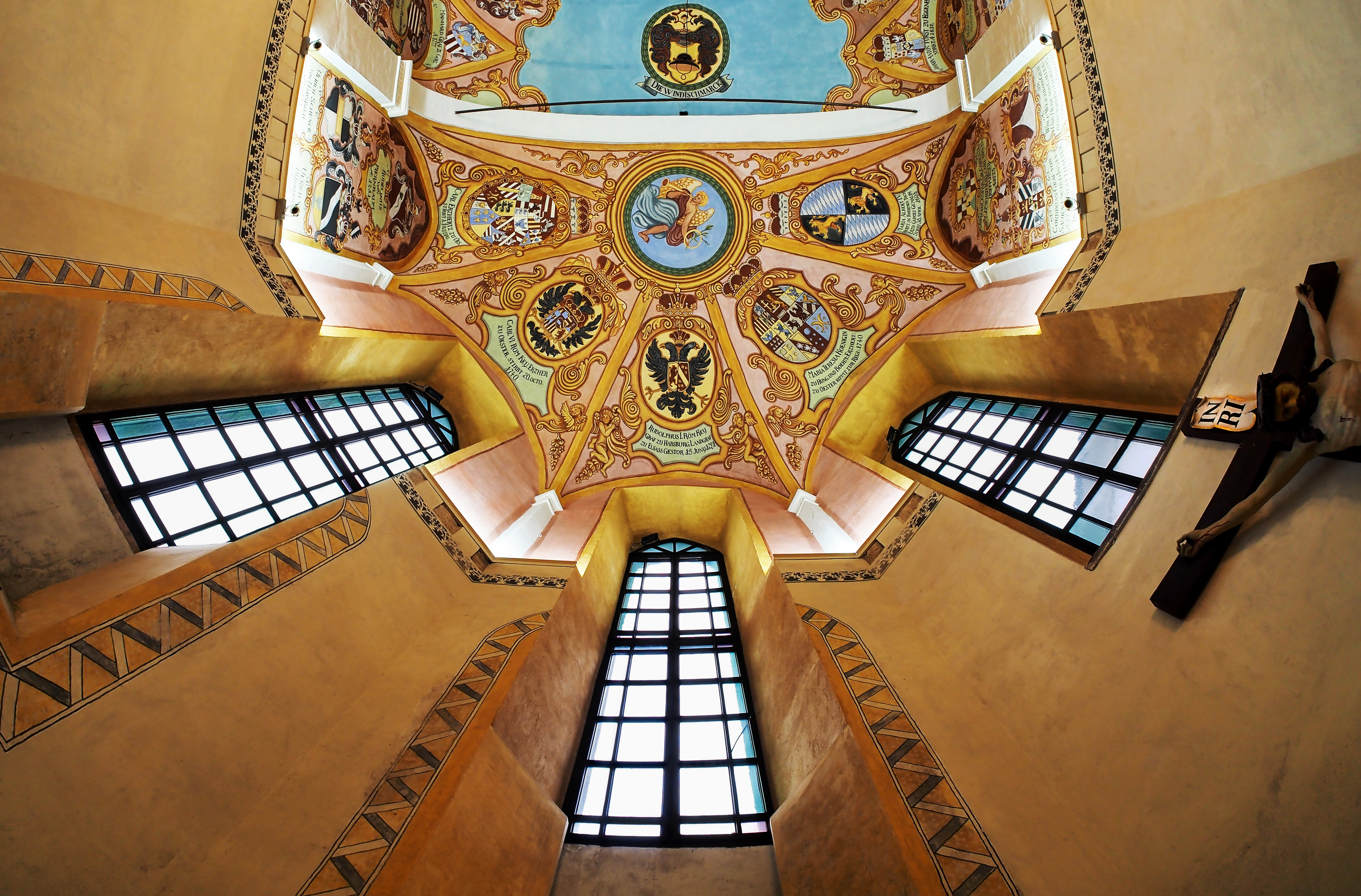
Interior of St. George's Chapel

The first Ljubljana Castle is believed to have been a wooden and stone fortification built in the 11th century. The oldest written mention of Ljubljana Castle is inscribed on a parchment sheet Nomina defunctorum (names of the dead), which is kept by the Udine Cathedral Archive and most probably dates to the second half of 1161. It mentions the nobleman Rudolf of Tarcento, a lawyer of the Patriarchate of Aquileia, who had bestowed a canon with 20 farmsteads beside Ljubljana Castle (castrum Leibach) to the Patriarchate. According to the historian Peter Štih's deduction, this happened between 1112 and 1125.

Until 1144 the castle became property of the House of Sponheim. In 1256, Ljubljana Castle was mentioned in a document as the most important castle of the rulers of Carniola (Latin: castrum capitalis). In the late 1270, it was conquered by King Ottokar II of Bohemia. In 1278, after the defeat of Ottokar, it became property of Rudolph of Habsburg.

In the 15th century, it was almost completely demolished and rebuilt with a complete wall and towers at the entrance, where a drawbridge was placed. St. George's Chapel was also built at that time. In the 16th and 17th centuries, other objects were gradually built. The castle's purpose was to defend the empire against Ottoman invasion as well as peasant revolt.

=== Baroque period ===
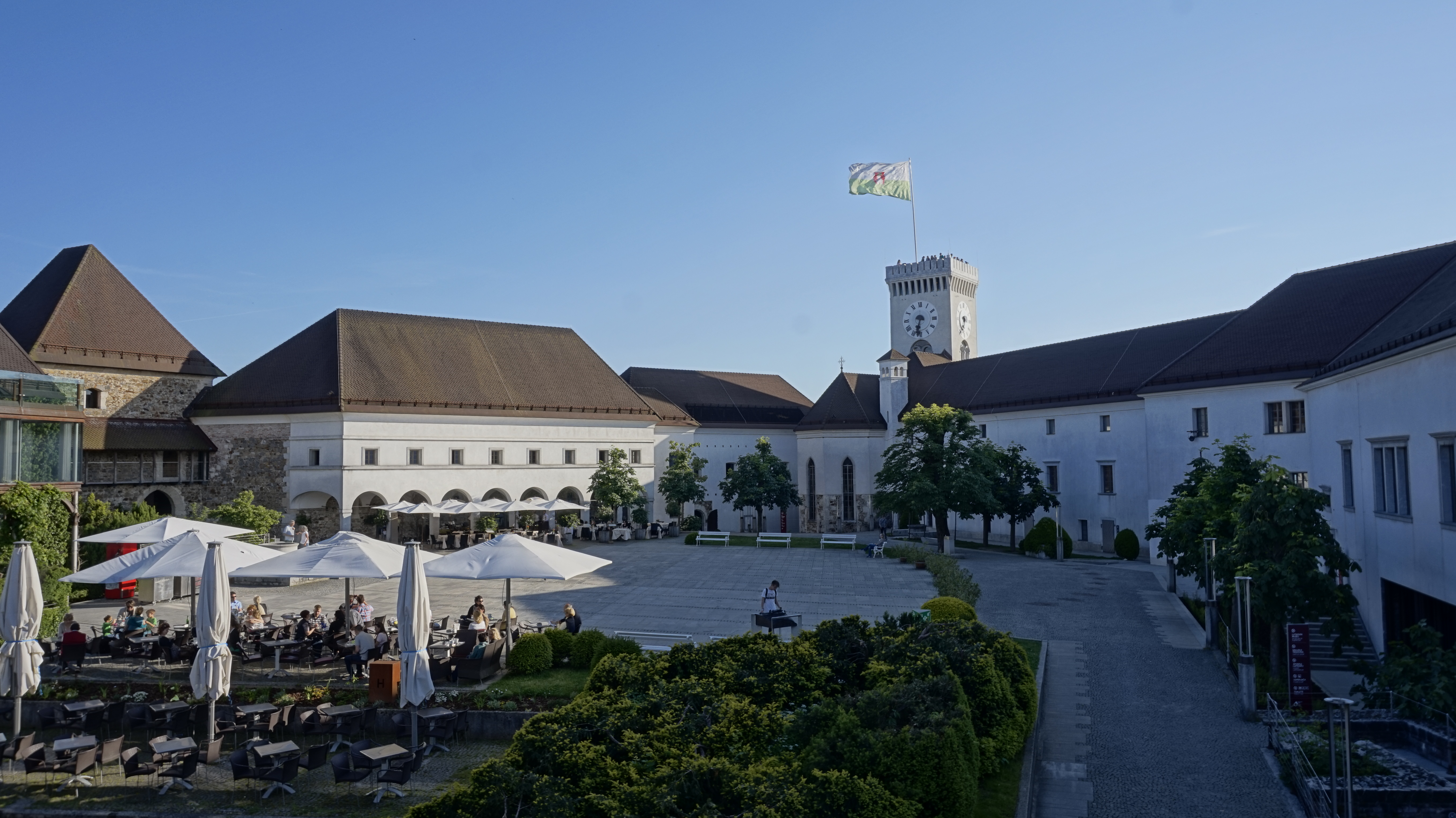
Courtyard of Ljubljana Castle

In the 17th and 18th centuries, the castle became an arsenal. In 1797 the town of Ljubljana and the castle were occupied for the first time by the French army, and again in 1809. In the period of the Illyrian Provinces, the castle was used as barracks and a military hospital. In 1815, back in the Austrian Empire, it became a prison, which it remained until 1895, with a hiatus between 1848 and 1868, resuming that function during World War II. The castle's Viewing Tower dates to 1848; this was inhabited by a guard whose duty it was to fire cannons warning the city in case of fire or announcing important visitors or events.

Because it was not a home of a ruler or another important noble person and because a fortification in the area was no longer required, the castle started to lose its importance. The maintenance costs were too high so the castle began to crumble. In the 19th century, the castle was redesigned partially as a prison and partially as a military stronghold, making it less popular among the citizens. Several famous people were jailed in the castle, including the Italian revolutionary Silvio Pellico, the Hungarian Prime Minister Lajos Batthyany and the Slovene author Ivan Cankar.

The castle and the dragon are depicted on Ljubljana's coat of arms

In 1905, the castle was bought by Municipality of Ljubljana for 60,200 Kronen, on the explicit wish of the mayor, Ivan Hribar, who planned to establish a city museum in it. The plan was however not carried out. Instead, the city decided to settle poor families into it. The residents stayed there until 1963, when preparations for renovation of the castle began.

The remains of the fortifications on Castle Hill were reworked in the 1930s a promenade called Šance, designed by the Slovenian architect Jože Plečnik.

=== Contemporary history ===
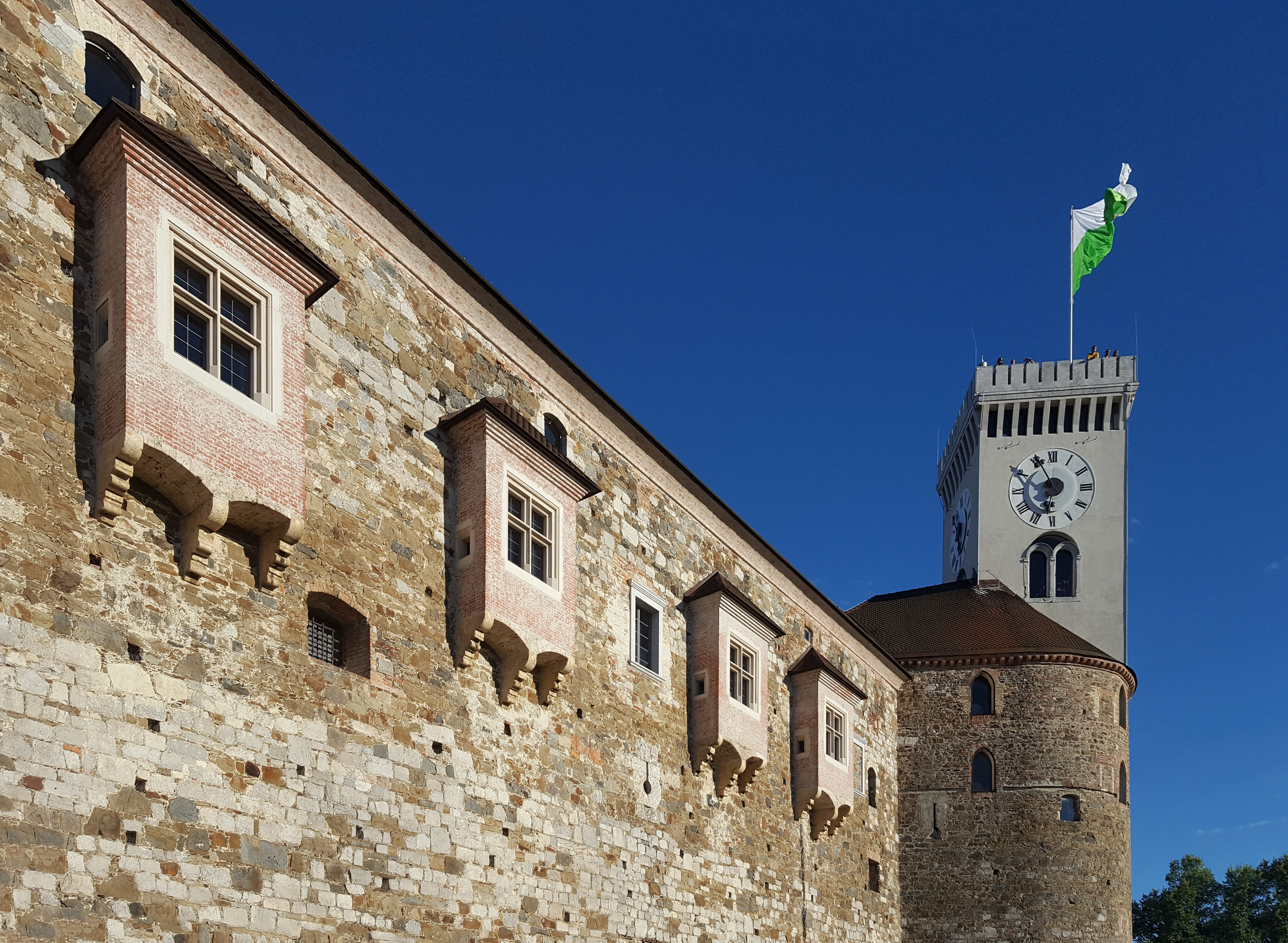
Medieval bay windows at the southern side

Extensive renovations commenced in 1970 and are being executed according to the plans by the Ambient - Architecture Firm (architects: Edo Ravnikar jr., Miha Kerin, Majda Kregar). In the 1990s, the castle began to be used as a place for weddings and cultural events. In 1974, a monument by the sculptor Stojan Batič dedicated to the Slovene peasant revolts (especially to the Slovene peasant revolt of 1515 and the Croatian and Slovenian peasant revolt of 1573) was erected in the vicinity of the castle. The Ljubljana Castle funicular, a funicular railway to the top of Castle Hill, was built in 2006 and began service on 28 December 2006.

== Architecture ==
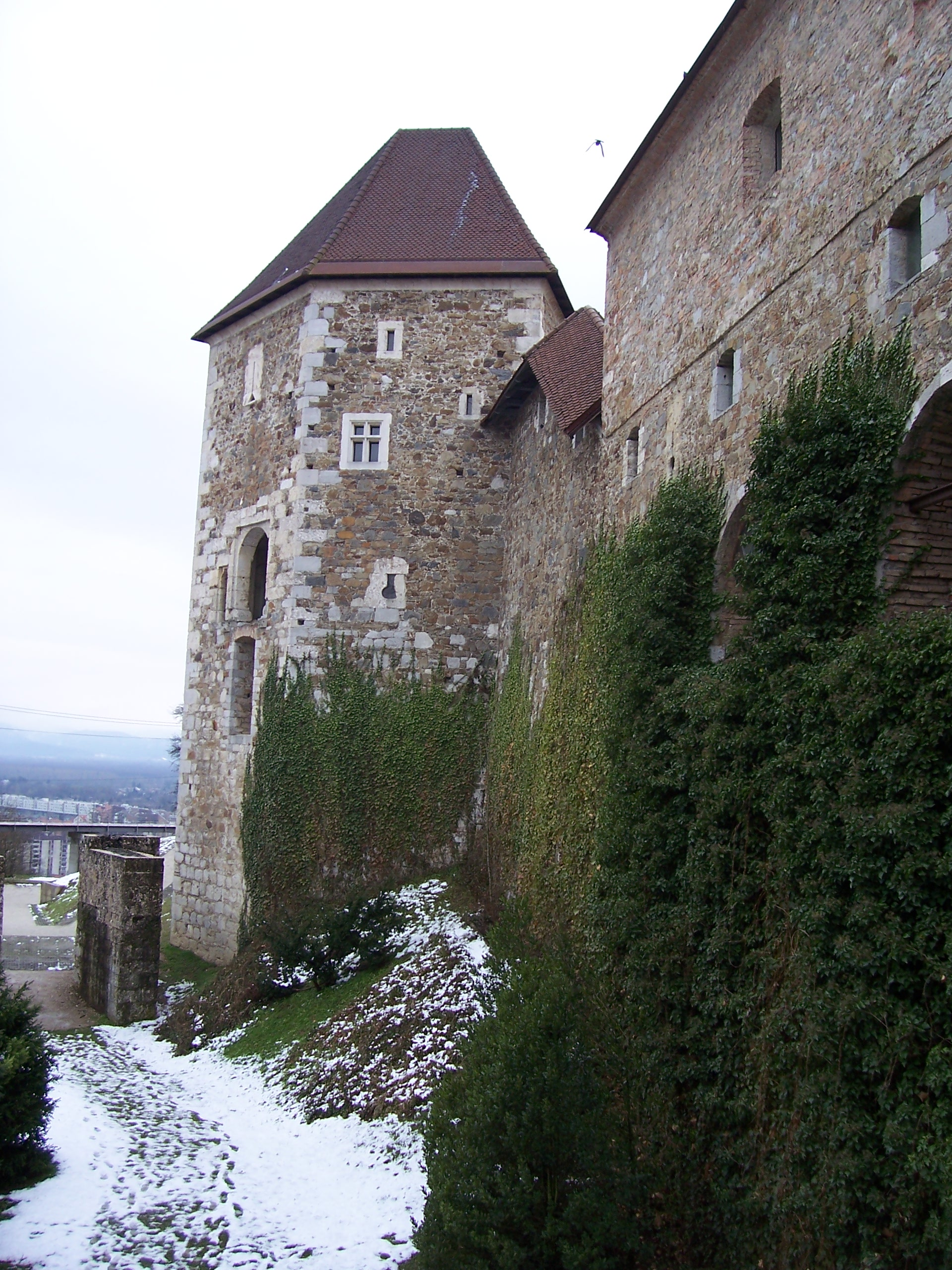
Facade of Ljubljana Castle

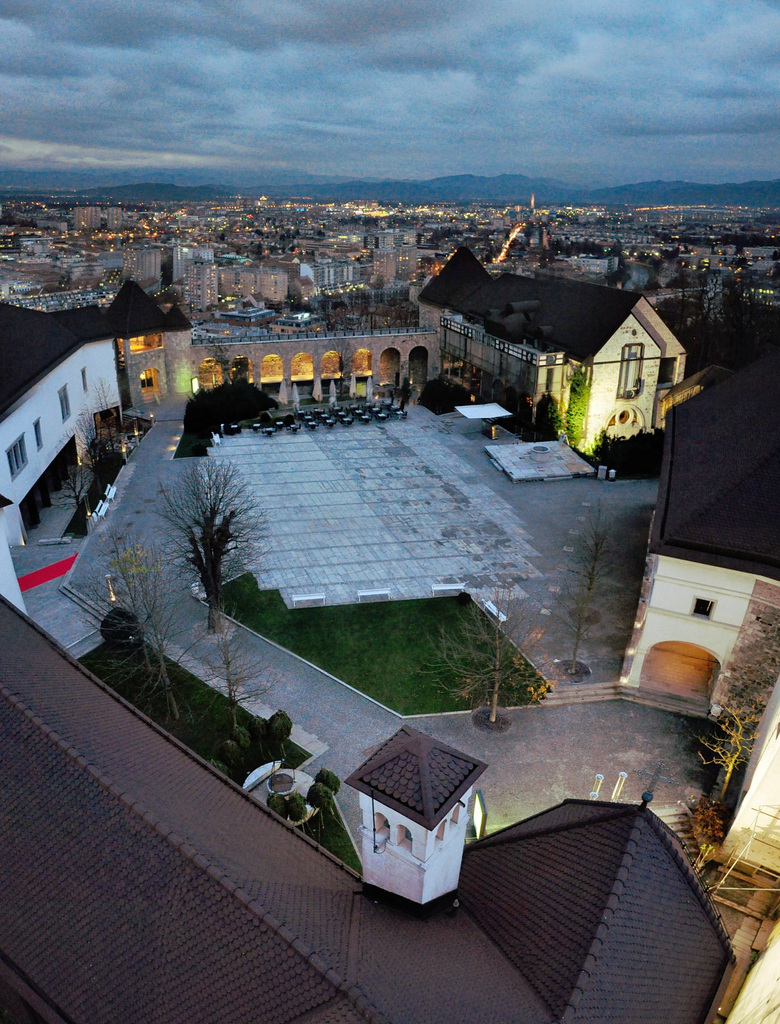
Ljubljana Castle from the air

Ljubljana Castle, as seen from a kite

Today the castle consists of the following buildings. To the right of the entrance is the Archers Tower, next to it is the gunpowder store, later are the dungeon and the Tower of Erasmus named after the infamous robber-knight Erazem Lueger and the master of the Predjama castle, the former prison for the nobles, at last is the information center. To the courtyard surround the Estate Hall and the Palatium, two buildings with the rooms destined to concerts and gala receptions. Next to it is Fridericks Tower, Kazemate, the chapel of St. George and the panoramic tower in which is the virtual Museum. In the old gunpowder store the permanent exhibition The Slovenian history was opened in 2010. Next to it are located the Hall of Hribar, that in the past was used like the store of arms, and the Pentagonal Tower. To the left of the entrance is the only contemporary building, built in the 80's of last century, in which there are two wedding rooms, cafeteria and souvenir shop. Visitors to the castle can go down to the gallery 'S', several rooms and the cisterns that are under the patio.

Below the level of the patio is also the upper funicular station. The funicular was built in 2006, but the idea about the connection between the city and the castle goes back to the end of the century, when Ivan Hribar was mayor of Ljubljana. The funicular rises up the hill along the wall that connected the medieval city with the castle. The length of the tracks between the lower station in Krekov and the upper station in Ljubljana Castle is 117.69 meters. The difference in height is 69.70 meters. The capacity of the funicular is 500 people per hour in one direction.

The castle can be accessed by road, by several trails through the forest that surrounds it, or by the funicular. The castle is an attractive tourist spot and hosts a large number of cultural events, weddings, concerts, theater performances, exhibitions, congresses and protocol receptions.

=== Entrance to the castle complex ===
The current entrance to the castle consists of a bridge, built in the seventeenth century, when the wall of the castle was pierced in this part. It is mentioned as the main entrance of the castle from the year 1815. The original wooden bridge existed until the beginning of the 19th century, when the defense pit was filled. During the later remodeling and rediscovery of the transverse moat on the side of the castle, it was restored to its medieval appearance of yesteryear with the construction of the current bridge, which connects the grove of the castle with the building itself. The present form of the entrance was born on the basis of the idea of the architect Boris Kobe. On the right side of the curved entrance to the courtyard of the castle is a sculpture of the legendary dragon symbol of Ljubljana, originally from the town of Kropa. It was sculpted by Joža Bertoncelj (1901–1976). A memorial plaque recalls the raw wartime and the names of the fallen in Ljubljana Castle.

=== Archers' Tower ===
The bases date back to the 15th century; the smaller tower was built in the 16th century, then its height was elevated. In the past it served as a powder store and from the outside it is possible to see clearly the openings from where it was fired. From the tower ran a protective wall to the Padav Tower (present Šance) and from there to the Pisana vrata door (colorful door) - in the current street Gornji trg. Between 1946 and 1953 the tower was remodeled under the direction of Boris Kobe. On the ground floor there was a brewery, on the upper floor a coffee shop. Kobe dedicated himself especially to the decoration of the interiors. Together with the painter Marij Pregelj (1913–1967) they laid the foundations for sgraffito images. Artists created the images together, so it is difficult to differentiate between the two authors. Some images, not all, have an initial K or P. The images run on a wide ribbon around the circular tower, with interruptions in the openings (windows, doors). The images are framed and make up a story with continued episodes. Below the different images texts are presented. The motifs of the images are taken from popular Slovenian themes: Rošlin and Verjanko (ballad), Mada Zora (ballad), Lepa Vida (ballad), Desetnica (ballad), Povodni mož (mythology) and Zverina premagana (song about animals). Below the different images texts are presented. The motifs of the images are taken from popular Slovenian themes: Rošlin and Verjanko (ballad), Mada Zora (ballad), Lepa Vida (ballad), Desetnica (ballad), Povodni mož (mythology) and Zverina premagana (song about animals). Below the different images texts are presented. The motifs of the images are taken from popular Slovenian themes: Rošlin and Verjanko (ballad), Mada Zora (ballad), Lepa Vida (ballad), Desetnica (ballad), Povodni mož (mythology) and Zverina premagana (song about animals).

=== Wall of defense / panoramic terrace ===
The defense wall connects the Tower of the shooters with the Tower of Erasmus. The panoramic Terrace rises on the medieval wall and served as a summer recreation spot, after the shooter tower was converted into a restaurant.

=== The prison and the vine of the castle ===
The prison space of the castle lies between the castle wall and the natural rock. The prison was only accessed from the level of the patio, which means that the prisoners were lowered into the pit by a rope or a chain. In a small space the prisoners with their ankles chained waited for the sentence to pass. The sources indicate that in this space was enclosed Turkish soldiers made prisoners, Protestants and insurgent peasants. The space had no roof, there would be a fence over the prisoners' heads. The number of people locked up at the same time is unknown. What is known is that living conditions were drastic, since in this small space all basic needs (food and defecation) were developed. The sun's rays came in through the roof, as well as the snow in winter. Also a vine found its place in the Ljubljana Castle. It was planted on September 30, 1990, as a symbol of the friendship between the cities of Ljubljana and Maribor. It is known that the vine preserved in Lent is the oldest vine cultivated in the world, since it has more than four hundred years. The variety is called modra kavčina or žametna črnina. The wine association of Maribor has a strict regulation on who is given an outbreak, previously confirming the characteristics of the soil and the manager. The friendship between Slovenian towns and villages, as well as between European cities, is created by giving an outbreak, as the vineyard grows, among others, also in Paris (Musée du vin).

=== The Tower of Erasmus ===
The tower, baptized in memory of the knight and bandit Erazem Lueger also known as Erazem Predjamski of the Luegger family, served, according to archaeologists' assumptions, as an aristocratic prison. In the walls it is possible to see engraved with messages manuscripts and graphs, between which also is the year 1442. One of the shields would belong to Erasmo Jamski. The noble Erasmus, rich lord and owner of numerous castles, at a gala dinner, stabbed an army commander in a rage. As this would probably not be an isolated incident, the then territorial governor, Krištof von Thein, decided to lock him up. He spent a couple of weeks in prison with his brother. Erasmo's life story did not end in prison at Ljubljana Castle, as he managed to escape. No one understood how he did it, since the castle was solidly protected, the drawbridge lifted at night, so that escape was practically impossible. The most likely hypothesis is that the rich man has bribed the guard, who showed him a secret exit. In this way Erasmus returned to his stronghold at Predjama Castle.

=== Kazemate ===
The name (in German, Kasematten) is already mentioned in the plans that date of the years 1815 and 1816. The original (medieval) purpose of that space was of protection against attacks with cannons. This space served until the fifteenth century as an extension of the main entrance next to the Tower of Whistles and a passage between Bastille to the Tower of Federick and the courtyard of the castle. In the nineteenth century this space was leveled and intended as a bedroom for the condemned. After it is no longer used as a prison, it becomes a simple warehouse or deposit for firewood. Of all the spaces of the castle it is the one that less arranged experienced and thanks to its elongated and high form, it gave the sensation to be the hall of the gentlemen; and just as such the inhabitants of the castle mistakenly called it.

=== Castle Chapel of St George ===
On the basis of a document of the year 1489 emitted by the emperor was consecrated to St. George, St. Pancracio and the Empress Helena. The original entrance to the chapel was in the north; it was reached along thirteen steps and is in use to this day. Later it was reached the original Gothic chapel had openings in the ceiling, counted on four Gothic windows and a balcony from which the nobles listened to the Holy Mass. This construction was restored in Baroque style and in the year 1747 they reflected in her images of the shields of the governors. The function of the latter enters into history in parallel with the formation of nations, at the end of the thirteenth century.

=== The Panoramic Tower ===
After the departure of the French, the Tower of Whistles collapsed, placing, two years later, in the place of the old defense tower, a wooden tower destined for sending signals in case of fire. The old wooden tower was replaced during the years 1845 and 1848 by a masonry tower. The tower included a home for the fire watchman who with gunfire warned of fires in the city. The present panoramic tower was elevated 1.20 m. in the year 1982. To the top leads a double spiral staircase, recalling the time when it was part of a fortress in which logistics required soldiers not to cross on the stairs. Currently the tower is an attractive panoramic point for local and foreign visitors. In good weather you can see the Julian Alps and Kamnik-Savinja Alps, as well as the Karawanks chain and the nearby mountains. The tower is open every day of the year.

=== Gallery "S" and the small cistern ===
The elongated and rectangular space below the level of the castle courtyard arose from the construction of the service areas of Ljubljana Castle. In this space the method of collecting water is represented archaeologically. The top of the cistern can be seen in the courtyard of the castle, in the part of stone is inscribed in the year 1588. The cistern lid was moved in the twentieth century from the garden of the Ursuline nuns of Ljubljana. On the floor below the patio is possible to enter the environment in which the water (rain or snow) filtered into the so-called filtration pit. In the center of the filtration pit is the 1m collection hole. diameter; there it was possible to obtain potable water also in times of drought. Water droplets-source of life were shaped by the artist Tanja Pak.

=== Hribar Hall and Armoury ===
The Weapons Room (space on the ground floor) is located between the pentagonal tower and the gunpowder store. It would have been built in 1524 according to the wishes of Emperor Ferdinand. It also served as a stable, barn and dwelling for the soldiers who gathered in the castle. The Sala de Hribar is located on the first floor and was named after the Mayor Ivan Hribar. At the time of its mandate the city received numerous news and acquisitions: the canalization, the first hydroelectric power station, the first public transport to electricity - the tram; 16 of May 1905 the city council bought Ljubljana Castle.

=== Pentagonal Tower ===
The tower served in the fifteenth century as the main entrance to the patio of the catillo. The inhabitants before it were connected with the outside world by means of two drawbridges that crossed the defense pit. On the outside stood a hill, Lipnik, made artificially as tall as the upper openings. Different openings can also be seen for the firing of weapons, since the fortress was adapted to the most modern weapons. In the upper floor was the house of the manager of the building. The currently renovated tower has no roof and is intended for exhibitions, minor concerts and plays. In front of the entrance to the tower there is a silhouette of another cistern on the ground. It served as a cistern or a secret exit of the castle.

=== Rock Hall ===
Today it is a space for gastronomy, having received its name from the imposing rocks in the center of the room, which represent the geological structure of the castle hill. The entrance to the room is located under the bridge of the castle or under the double spiral staircases of the gastronomic place. As confirmed by the archaeological findings, in this part of Ljubljana Castle, between the Tower of the shooters and the pentagonal Tower, stood the old room just in the sixteenth and seventeenth centuries. The plans of the early nineteenth century describe this space as a warehouse of firewood for guards and prison administrators. This area was renovated in the early nineties and is, at the same time, the first major renovation of the castle in Ljubljana.

=== Castle Courtyard ===
In the embrace of the wall and the towers, the space of the inner courtyard of the castle is ideal for various events. The story confirms that it was used for the gathering of the army of the nobility, since there was not enough room in the city. At a time when the provincial prison (1813–1945) was here, the courtyard was used as a walking space, the prisoners in the shade of the chestnut trees performed their daily tasks. The traces of the last reforms play with the Gothic and Baroque architectural forms of that time, also inserting modern elements. The current courtyard is a dynamic meeting point - a point through which it is possible to reach all the inner spaces of the castle.
