= Cobenzl =

Austrian noble family

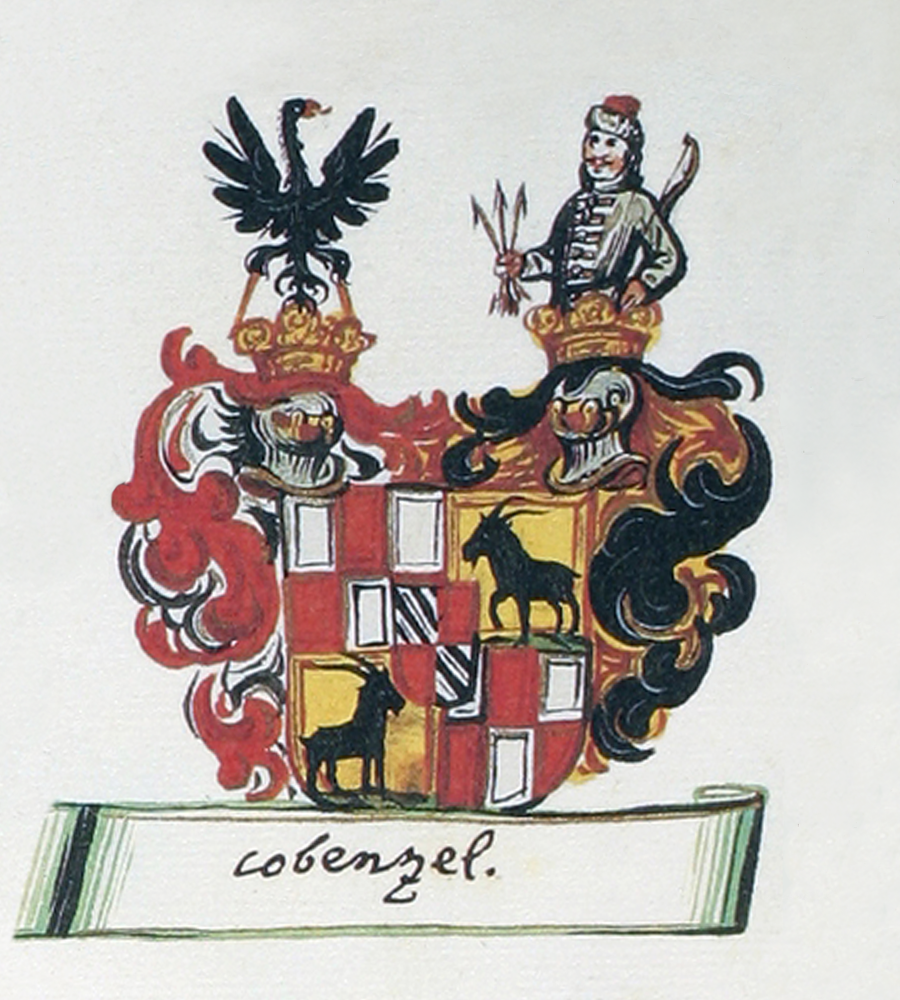
Coat of arms of the Cobenzl family

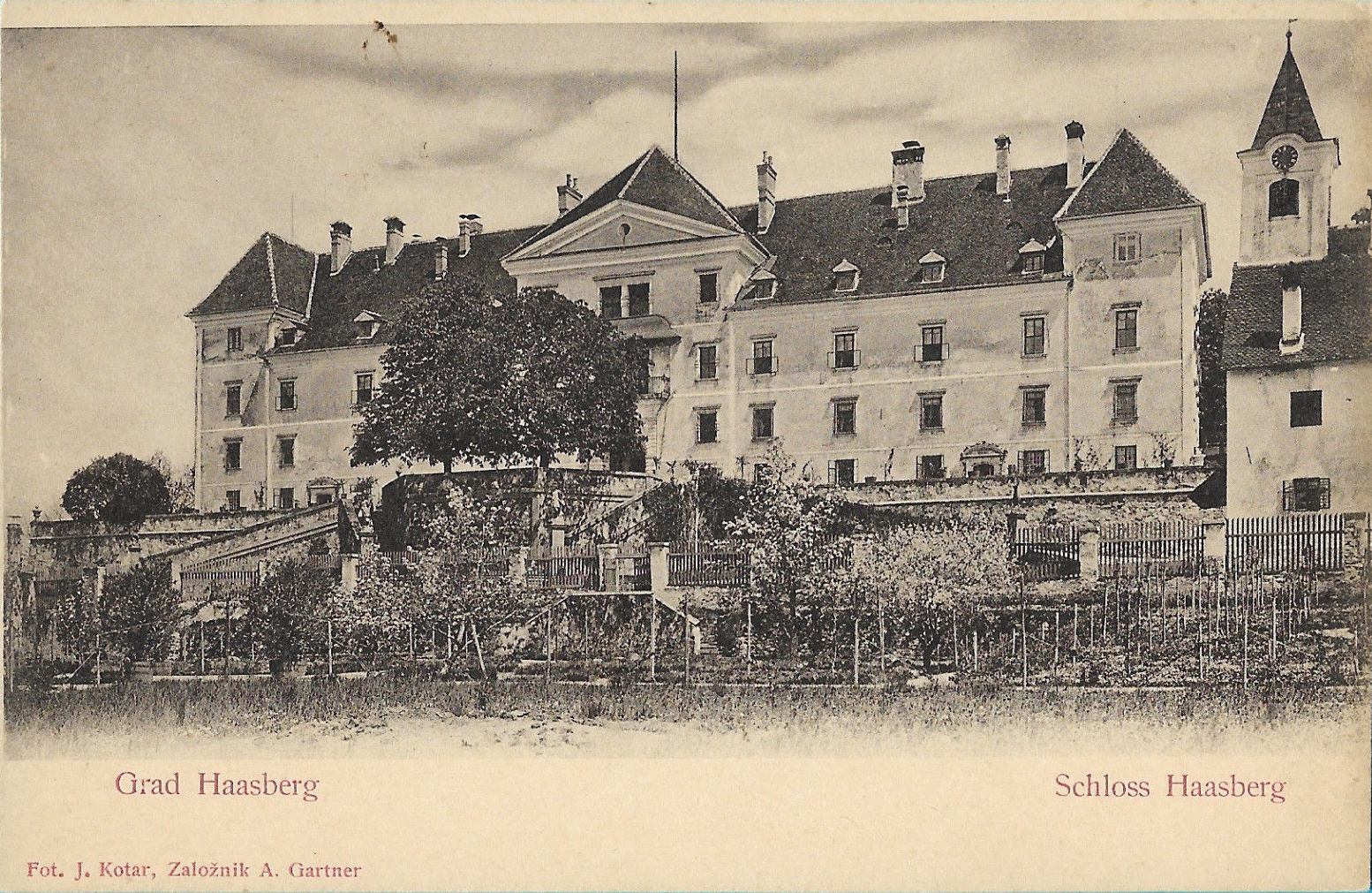
Schloss Haasberg, the main seat of the family in the 18th century

The Cobenzl family was an Austrian noble family from Carinthia. They had the bulk of their possessions in present-day Slovenia and had an important role in the history of Carniola and the County of Gorizia. Several of its members served as diplomats for the Habsburg rulers.

== History ==
The family was first mentioned in 1204, and was elevated by imperial order to Freiherren von Cobenzl in 1588 and raised to Imperial Counts in 1722. In the 1570s, baron Johann Cobenzl was the ambassador of emperor Maximilian II and later Rudolf II at the court of the Russian tsar Ivan the Terrible. He also served as regent (Landeshauptmann) of Carniola. Other members of the families have served as regents in Gorizia and Carniola in the 17th and 8th century.

By the 16th century, most of the family's estates were located in what is now Slovenia. Among others, the Cobenzls owned the castles of Haasberg, Predjama and Štanjel.

During the 18th century, several notable members of the family held important administrative and political positions in the Habsburg monarchy, especially in the Austrian Netherlands (present-day Belgium):

== Genealogy ==
Jean-Philippe de Cobenzl, died 1702: Married Jeanne de Lanthiery

  1. Johann Gaspard, Count von Cobenzl, died 1742: Knight of the Golden Fleece. Lord Chamberlain of the Archduchess.
    Married to Carolina Sophia von Rindsmaul (1682-1756).
    1. Count Johann Karl Philipp von Cobenzl (1712–1770) : Knight of the Golden Fleece.
      1. Maria Theresie von Cobenzl : marr. Count de Varick.
      2. Count Ludwig von Cobenzl (1753–1809)
      3. Maria Eleonore von Cobenzl: married to François III Maximilien de la Woestyne, 3rd Marquess of Becelaere.
    2. Guidobald von Cobenzl (1716–1797): marr. Maria Benigna von Montrichier (1720–1793).
      1. Philipp Graf von Cobenzl, (1741–1810): last heir of Cobenzl.
      2. Johann Ludwig Carl, Count von Cobenzl
