= Marquess of Becelaere =

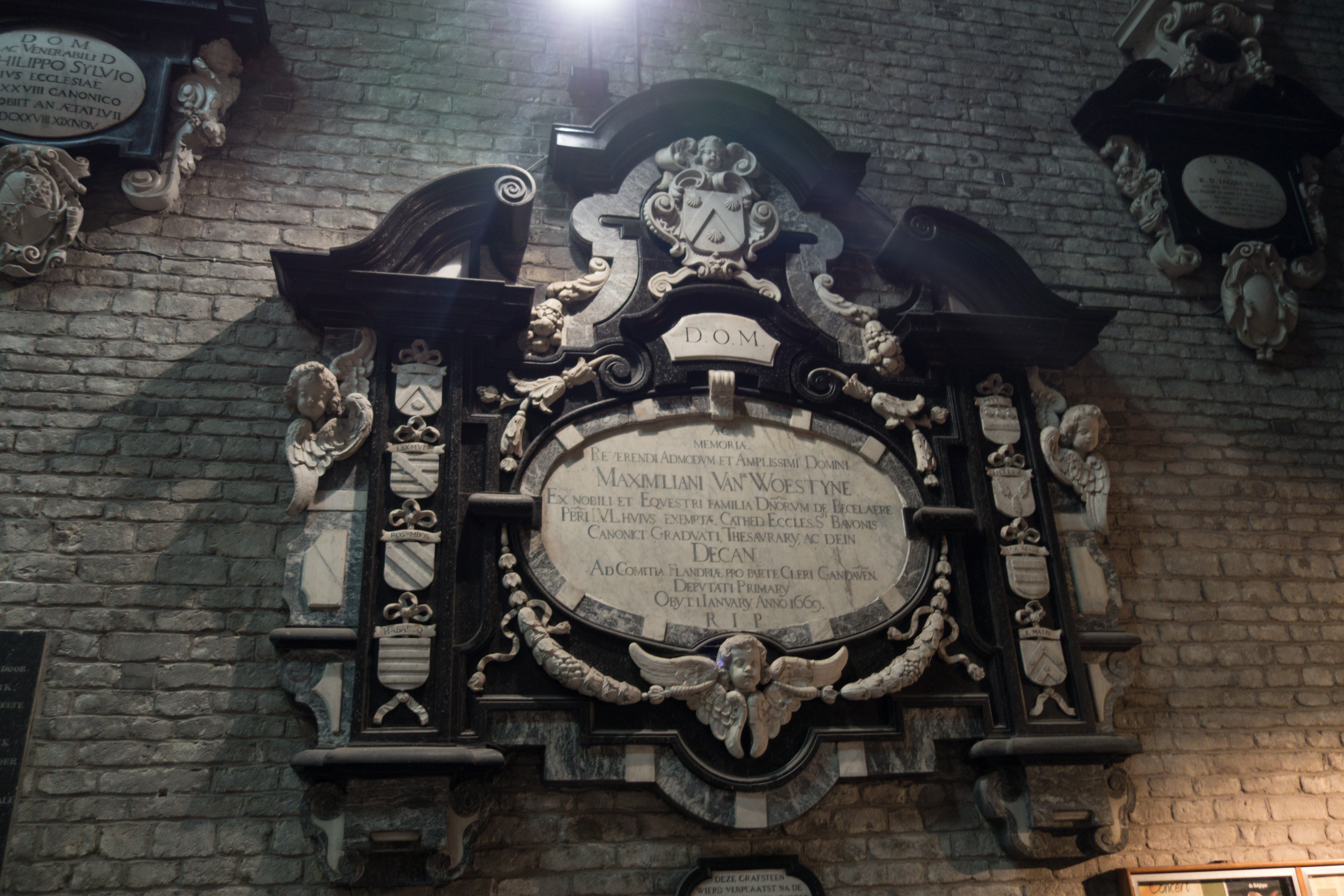
Canon of Ghent: Maximilian van de Woestyne de Becelaere, died 1669.

The Marquess of Becelaere is a former French title, now extinct. Becelaere, in Flanders, is an old spelling of Beselare, in Zonnebeke.

== History ==
The title was created for Maximilien-Emmanuel de la Woestyne, 1st Marquess of Becelaere (1660-1729) in 1705 by Louis XIV. His ancestors, the house of la Woestyne, had long possessed the Flemish lordship of Becelaere. The title was passed by male primogeniture. For over 400 years the family inhabited Beselare Castle.

1. Maximilien I de la Woestyne, Lord of Becelaere, marr. Anne of Huerne.
  1. Maximilien II de la Woestyne de Becelaere: Canon of the Chapter, Ghent.
  2. François I de la Woestyne, Lord of Becelaer, Knighted in 1640. Married to Maria of Melun.
    1. Philip François de la Woestyne, Baron of Becelaere: married to Magdalene of Troibeze.

=== Marquesses of Becelaere ===
Maximilien III Emmanuel de la Woestyne, 1st Marquess of Becelaere:
married to Louise Eugénie de Melun, granddaughter of Charles de Ligne, 2nd Prince of Arenberg.

  1. Maximilien IV de la Woestyne, 2nd Marquess of Becelaere, Baron of troibeze and baron of Wallincourt. Married to Isabella de Ghellinck.
    1. François III Maximilien de la Woestyne, 3rd Marquess of Becelaere, (°1753) married to Marie Eleonore, daughter of Johann Karl Philipp von Cobenzl, he died 12 mei 1794, executed by Guillotine in Cambrai.
      1. Charles Ghislain de la Woestyne, 4th Marquess of Becelaere last Marquess left the country and the castle became abandoned.
  2. Guillaume Ferdinand de la Woestyne: Canon of the Chapter of Tournai.
