= Van de Woestijne =

Van de Woestijne is a Flemish surname. Notable people with the surname include:

- Gustave Van de Woestijne (1881–1947), Belgian painter
- Karel van de Woestijne (1878–1929), Flemish writer, brother of Gustave
- Maximilien Van de Woestijne (1911-2000), Belgian Painter.
- François III Maximilien de la Woestyne, 3rd Marquess of Becelaere (died 1794)
