= Joseph Le Bon =

French politician (1765–1795)

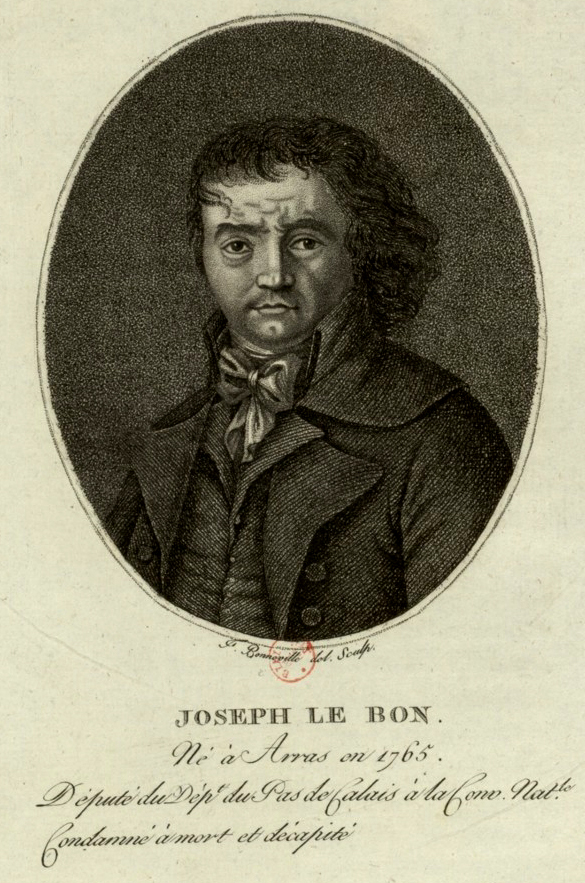
Joseph Le Bon

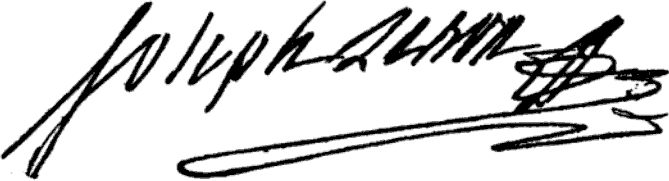
Joseph Le Bon signature

Joseph Le Bon (29 September 1765 – 10 October 1795) was a French politician.

== Biography ==
He was born at Arras. He became a priest in the order of the Oratory, and professor of rhetoric at Beaune. He adopted revolutionary ideas, and became a curé of the Constitutional Church in the department of Pas-de-Calais, where he was later elected as a député suppléant to the convention. He became maire of Arras and administrateur of Pas-de-Calais, and on 2 July 1793 took his seat in the convention.

He was sent as a representative on missions into the departments of the Somme and Pas-de-Calais, where he showed great severity in dealing with offences against revolutionaries (8th Brumaire, year II. to 22nd Messidor, year II.; i.e. 29 October 1793 to 10 July 1794).

In consequence, during the reaction which followed the 9th Thermidor (27 July 1794) he was arrested on the 22nd Messidor, year III. (10 July 1795). He was tried before the criminal tribunal of the Somme, condemned to death for abuse of his power during his mission, and executed at Amiens on the 24th Vendémiaire in the year IV. (10 October 1795). Whatever Le Bon's offences, his condemnation was to a great extent due to the violent attacks of one of his political enemies, Armand-Joseph Guffroy; and it is only just to remember that it was owing to his courage that the town of Cambrai was saved from falling into the hands of the Austrians.

His son, Émile Le Bon, published a Histoire de Joseph Le Bon et des tribunaux révolutionnaires d'Arras et de Cambrai (2nd edition 2 vols., Arras, 1864).

== Victims ==
During his stay in the north he chased many nobles, most of them condemned for treason and executed by guillotine

- François III Maximilien de la Woestyne, 3rd Marquess of Becelaere
- Charles Oudart, Marquess of Courronnel de Barastre
- Benoit Louis Lallart de Berlette
- Therese Dufour
- the Count of Bethune-Penin
- Laurence-Joseph-Amélie Lallart de Berles,
- Eleonore Julie de Duglas, wife of the marquis de Berthoult de Hauteclocque
- Auguste Joseph, Count of Mailly d'Haucourt
- Francois Valerien Caneau du Roteleur
- Pierre Antoine Boniface
- Charles-André Buchold dit Bucholtz, general
- Ignace Godefroy de Lannoy, 4th count of Beaurepaire
- Angelo Ghislain de Beaulaincourt, Count of Marles
- Henri, Baron of Wasservas d'Haplincourt
- Louis Ignace le Sergeant d'Hendecourt
- Lamoral Eugene, Baron of Aix de Remy
