= Johann Karl Philipp von Cobenzl =

Johann Philipp
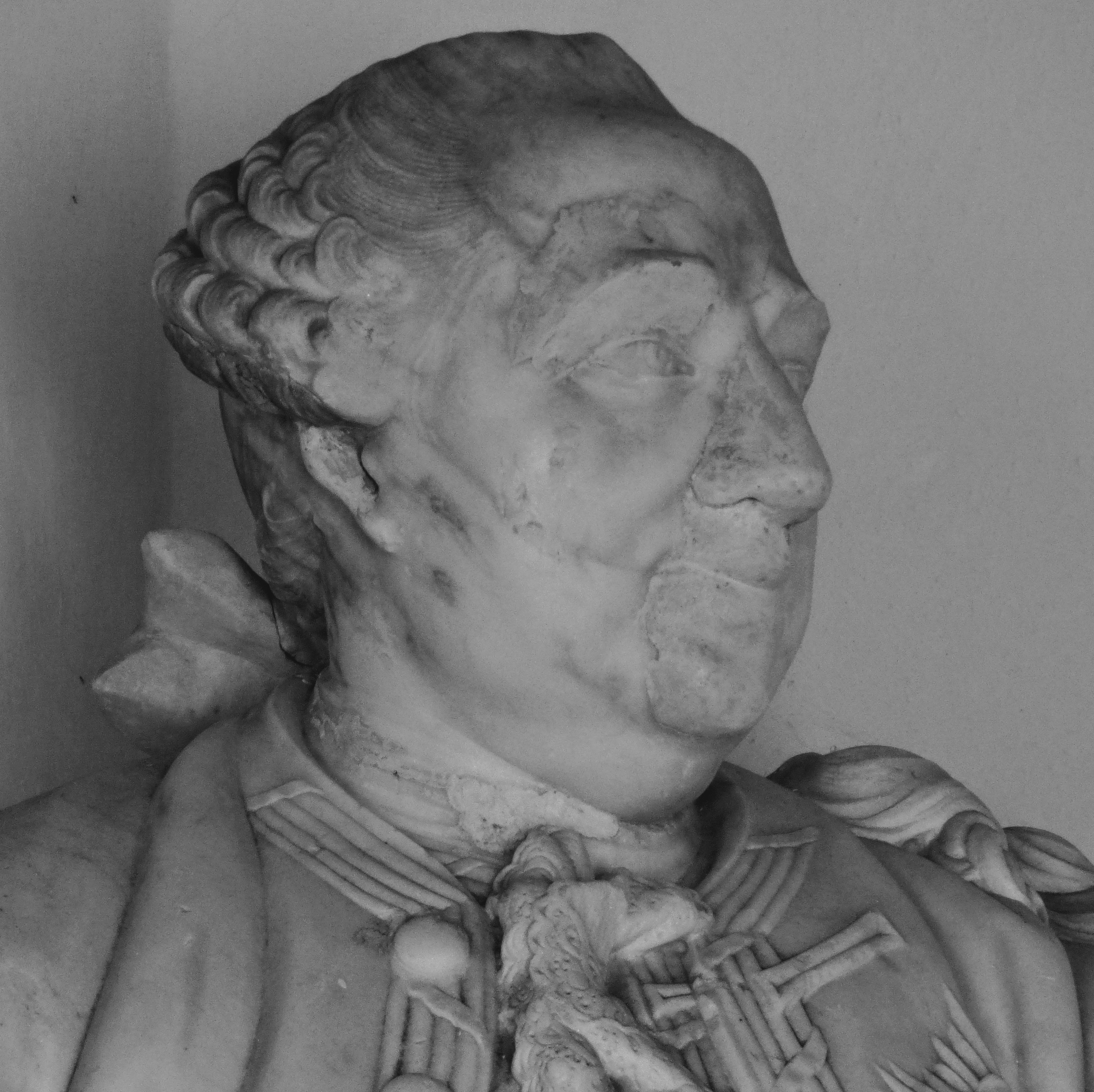
- The bust of Johann Karl Philipp, Graf von Cobenzl, at Predjama Castle (Höhlenburg Lueg)
- Born: 21 July 1712; Laibach, Carniola, Austria
- Died: 27 January 1770 (aged 57); Brussels, Brabant, Austria
- Children: Ludwig and 9 others
- Parent: Johann Cobenzl

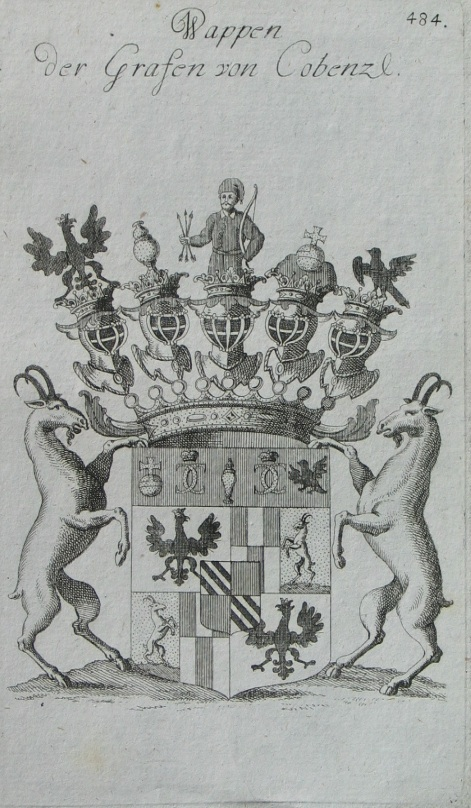
Coat of arms of the Cobenzl counts

Johann Karl Philipp, Graf von Cobenzl (21 July 1712 – 27 January 1770) was an 18th-century politician in the Habsburg monarchy. He was minister plenipotentiary of the Austrian Netherlands in Brussels under Empress Maria Theresia from 1753 until his death in 1770.

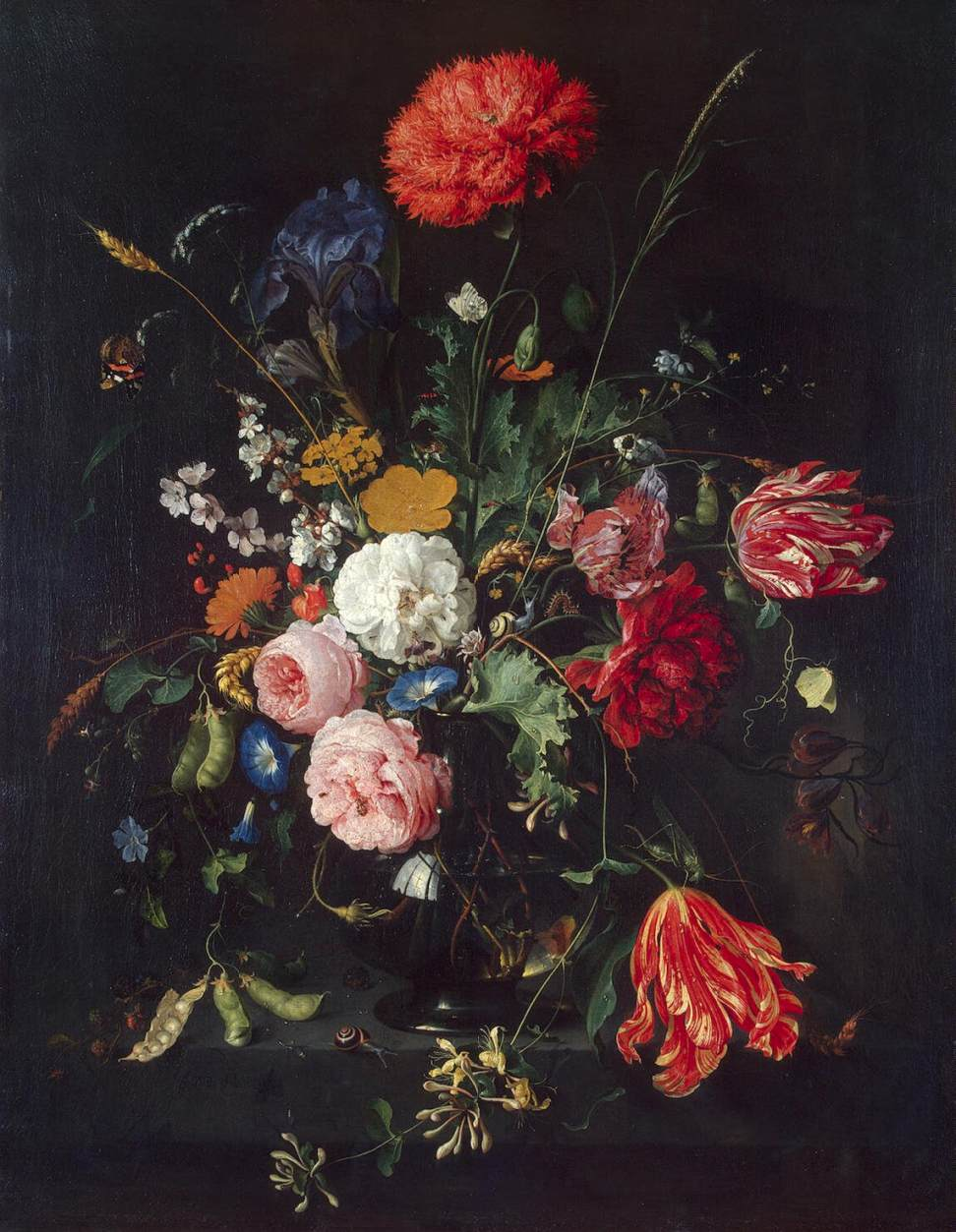
Flowers in a Vase, painted by Jan Davidszoon de Heem. This painting formed a part of the collection of Count Karl von Cobenzl in Brussels which was bought by Catherine the Great in 1768. The painting is currently on view in the Hermitage Museum.

== Life ==
Cobenzl was born in 1712 in Laibach, the capital of the Duchy of Carniola in the Habsburg Empire (present-day Ljubljana, Slovenia) as the son of Johann Caspar von Cobenzl (1664–1742), Imperial councillor and his second wife Carolina Sophia von Rindsmaul (1682–1756), and thus a member of the Austrian Von Cobenzl family.

He studied in Leiden and Würzburg and subsequently became treasurer of the emperor in 1730. Five years later, in 1735, he was appointed Imperial councillor, in succession of his father. From 1738 onward, he was committed to solve the boundary problems between Upper Lorraine and Lower Lorraine. During the reign of Empress Maria Theresia he was travelling as an envoy throughout the Habsburg Empire solving all kinds of problems.

On 19 May 1753, Cobenzl was appointed minister plenipotentiary of the Austrian Netherlands in Brussels by Empress Maria Theresia. His predecessor was Antoniotto Botta Adorno who then became Prime minister of Tuscany. In 1759, Cobenzl was appointed member of the Order of the Golden Fleece. Cobenzl's long term in office as minister plenipotentiary is seen as a successful period, although he constantly had to struggle with lack of money.

Well noted is his strong ambition for arts and culture throughout his life and he collected a huge amount of art. In 1768 in Brussels Catherine the Great bought the collections of Count Karl von Cobenzl and Prince Charles de Ligne which are now displayed in the Hermitage Museum in Saint Petersburg, Russia.

In 1769, a 'literary society' was established by Count Johann Karl Philipp von Cobenzl in Brussels, initially led by Johann Daniel Schöpflin and with regard to its resources mainly based on the vast collection of books and manuscripts of the library of the Burgundian dukes. These books and manuscripts were saved from destruction by fire when the Coudenberg Palace, the residence of the archdukes, burnt down in 1731.

However, shortly after the foundation of the society, Cobenzl died in Brussels on 27 January 1770 at the age of 57. Georg Adam, Prince of Starhemberg (1724-1807) became his successor as minister plenipotentiary of the Austrian Netherlands. Starhemberg continued the efforts of his predecessor in Brussels by transforming Cobenzl's 'literary society' in 1772 into the 'Imperial and Royal Academy of Brussels' with the approval of Empress Maria Theresia.

== Private life ==
On 24 November 1734, Johann Karl Philipp von Cobenzl married Maria Theresia Katharina Walburga Pálffy ab Erdöd (1719–1771), a granddaughter of Imperial field marshal Johann Bernhard Stephan, Graf Pálffy ab Erdöd (1664 - 1751). Ten children stemmed from this marriage, among them his famous son Johann Ludwig, Graf von Cobenzl, born in 1753. Karl von Cobenzl was a proponent of Enlightenment and a crucial figure for the promotion and support of Enlightenment in the Habsburg Netherlands. Due to his lavish spending on art, the deceased count left his wife a huge amount of debt in 1770. These debts were repaid by Empress Maria Theresa who subsequently also supported the widow.

== Descendants ==
1. Johanna Maria Anna (1735–1736)
2. Marie Eleonore: married to the 3rd Marquess of Becelaere, who was executed by guillotine
3. Marie Thérèse von Cobenzl (1739–1778): married Philippe Roger Joseph de Varick de Sart Baulai
4. Franz Joseph (1740–1741)
5. Josepha (1741–1741)
6. Johann Karl (1742–1751)
7. Johann Ludwig, Graf von Cobenzl (born 1753)

== See also ==
- Philipp von Cobenzl

Preceded by Marchese Antoniotto Botta Adorno	Authorized minister in the Austrian Netherlands (plenipotentiary); 1753–1770	Succeeded by Georg Adam, Prince of Starhemberg
