= Franz Caucig =

Slovene painter

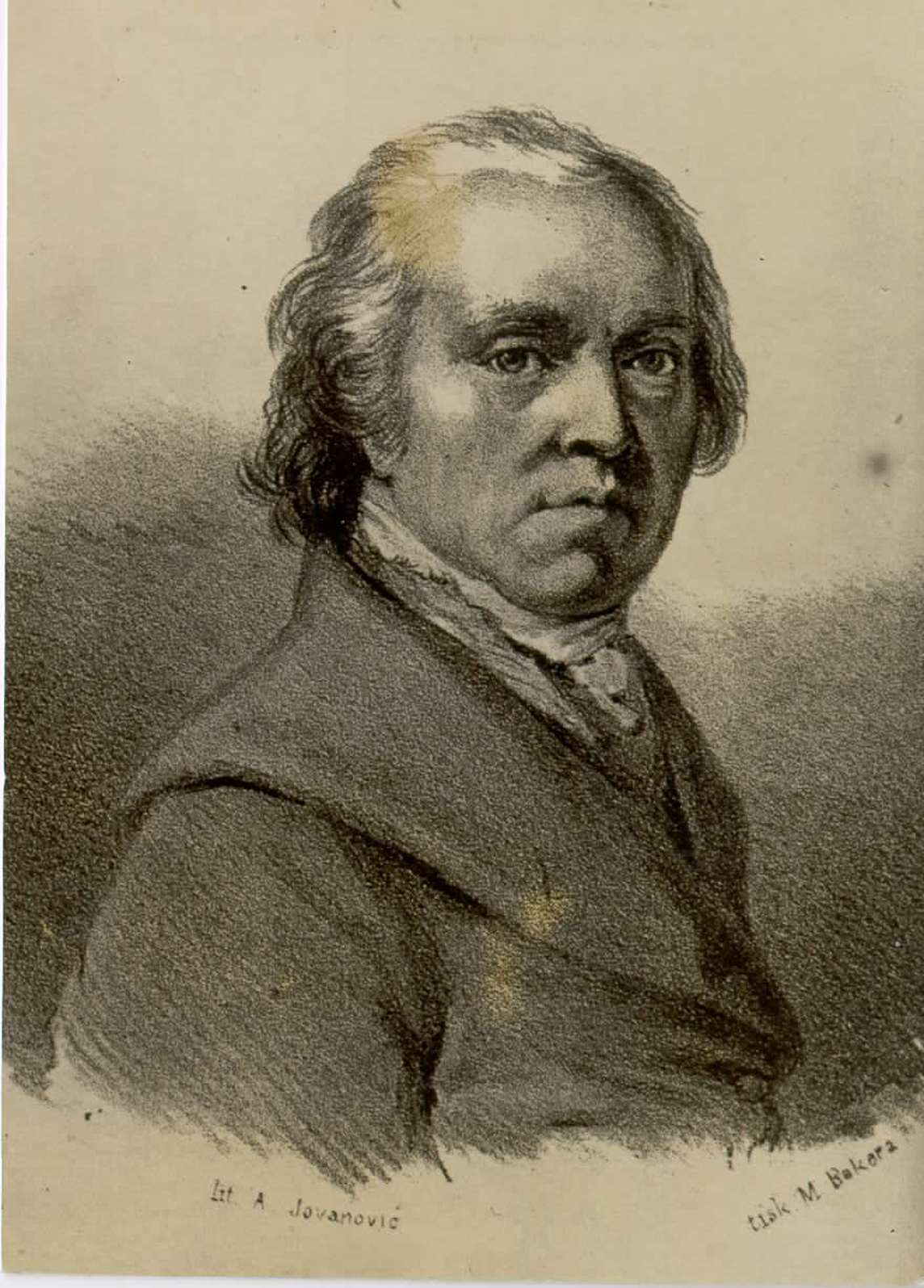
Franz Caucig, ca. 1807

Franz Caucig, Franco Caucig or Francesco Caucig, also known in Slovene as Franc Kavčič or Frančišek Caucig (4 December 1755, Gorizia – 17 November, 1828, Vienna) was a Neoclassical painter and draughtsman of Slovene origin. He is one of the best representatives of the Central European Neoclassicism. He attained the highest positions and recognitions of all the artists of Slovene descent.

== Life ==
Caucig was born in Gorizia, at the time the capital of the Princely County of Gorizia and Gradisca. Count Guido von Cobenzl, who spent the last years of his life in Gorizia, recognised the talent in the young boy, so when he was 20, he sent him to his son Philipp, who was very influential at the Austrian court, and who then greatly contributed to Caucig's education and further career.

Caucig studied the first principles of art at Vienna, and went, aided by a grant, in 1779, to Bologna and to Rome, where he remained until 1787. From 1787 till 1791, he lived in Vienna, and in 1791, he was enabled in the same way to visit Mantua, where he particularly copied Giulio Romano and reliefs on ancient sarcophagi. From 1791 to 1797, he resided at Venice, where he was in 1796 named a member of the committee of the Accademia di Belle Arti. He returned to Vienna in 1797, and in 1799 became the professor of drawing at the Vienna Academy.

In 1810, Caucig's nestor Cobenzl, who was the protector at the Academy, died and was replaced by Prince von Metternich. In 1815, Caucig was offered the post of the director of the Painting and Sculpture Class, but refused it, and accepted it only in 1820. He held the office until his death.

He died from pneumonia four days after the death of his wife and was buried in Gloggnitz, a town in the mountains of Lower Austria. They had no children.

== Work ==
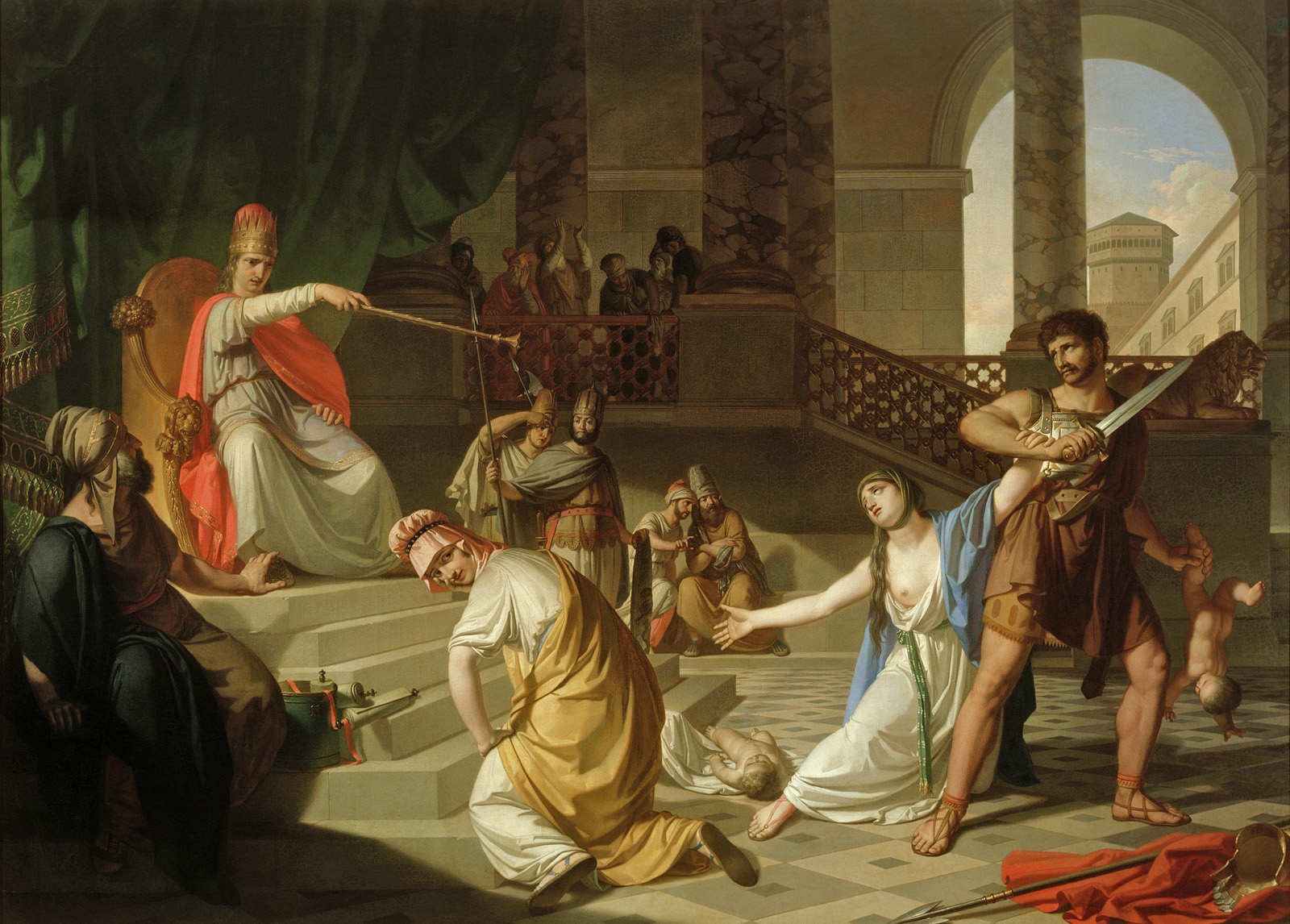
Caucig's best-known painting Judgment of Solomon, based on the Biblical story. Oil on canvas, ca. 1817.

Caucig was acquainted with the French Neoclassicism (for example, he saw the Oath of the Horatii in 1784), but was most influenced by Raphael and by the School of Bologna, and also by the Baroque in the sense of dramatic diagonals.

He was clever as a draughtsman, and created over 2000 drawings, the themes being the Italian and Austrian vedute, antique works of art and the works of arts of the Old Masters. He mainly depicted themes from the Antiquity, the Bible, and lives of the Christian saints, and some of his images were classified as belonging to the Egyptian Revival.

His works illustrate secular moralistic beliefs, according to the wishes of his purchasers, such as in contrast to the Christian moralistic depictions of earlier periods. However, he also created altar paintings and portraits. He created over 30 oils. In accordance with the ideals of his era, lines are sharp, the composition is transparent and balanced, and the ratios of figures and objects are proportionate, the space is defined with architectural elements, whereas colours are cold and of secondary importance.

Specimens of Caucig's works are kept in Ljubljana, in Vienna, in Hungary, in Italy, in Czech Republic, in Serbia and in the United States.

== Bibliography ==
• Johannes Röll: Ein Porträt des Malers Franz Caucig in einem Zeichnungsalbum der Bibliotheca Hertziana, Römisches Jahrbuch der Bibliotheca Hertziana 40, 2011/12 (2016), 289-309 • Johannes Röll e Ksenija Rozman: Franz Caucig: Die italienischen Landschaftszeichnungen. Cyriacus. Studien zur Rezeption der Antike Band 11, Ruhpolding und Mainz 2018
