= Johann Amadeus von Thugut =

Austrian diplomat (1736–1818)

The High Born Baron von Thugut
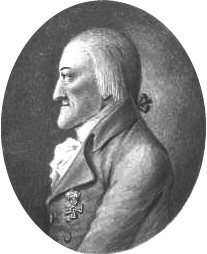
- Portrait by J. A. Ecker

State Chancellor of the Habsburg monarchy
- In office 27 March 1793 – 16 January 1801
- Monarch: Francis II
- Preceded by: Philipp von Cobenzl
- Succeeded by: Ferdinand von Trauttmansdorff (acting)

Personal details
- Born: 31 March 1736 Linz, Upper Austria
- Died: 28 May 1818 (aged 82) Vienna

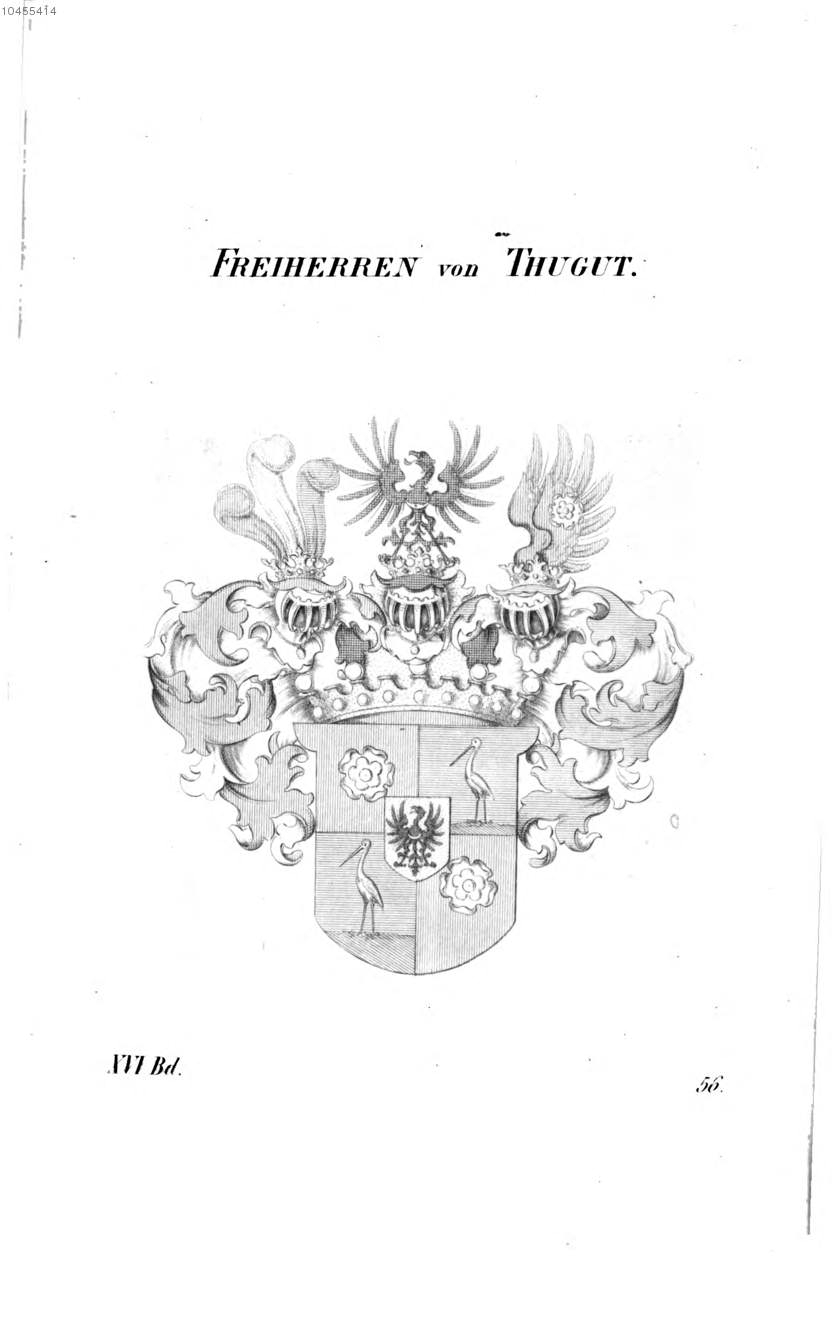
Arms of the Baron von Thugut

Johann Amadeus Franz de Paula Freiherr von Thugut (24 May 1736 – 28 May 1818) was an Austrian diplomat.

== Early life ==
He was born in Linz. His origin and his unusual name (literally "do good") have been the subject of some legends. One such legend was that the original form of his name was Thunichtgut, or Thenitguet ("do no good"), but that the name was altered to Thugut by Empress Maria Theresa. In reality, Thugut was the name of his great-grandfather, who came from Budweis in southern Bohemia. He was the legitimate son of Johann Thugut, an army paymaster, who married Eva Maria Mösbauer, daughter of a miller near Vienna. The paymaster, who died about 1760, left his widow and children in distress, and Maria Theresa took charge of them.

== Constantinople ==
Johann Amadeus was sent to the school of Oriental languages. He entered the Austrian foreign office as an interpreter and was appointed dragoman to the embassy at Constantinople. In 1769 he was appointed chargé d'affaires, and in that capacity secured a grant of money and a promise of the territory of Little Wallachia from the Turks during the negotiations connected with the First Partition of Poland.

In 1771 he was appointed internuncio at Constantinople and was actively engaged, under the direction of Prince Kaunitz, in all the diplomacy of Austria in Turkey and Poland until he secured the cession of the Bukovina on 7 May 1775. During these years Thugut was engaged in a mean intrigue. His salary as dragoman was small, and his needs great. He therefore agreed to receive a pension of 13,000 livres, a brevet of lieutenant-colonel, and a promise of a safe refuge in case of necessity from the king of France, Louis XV. The condition on which the pension was granted was that he took advantage of his position as an Austrian official to render secret services to France. The only excuses to be made for him are that such hidden arrangements were not uncommon before and in his time, and that as a matter of fact he never did render France any real service, or betray his masters at Vienna. Yet the terror of discovery disturbed him at several periods of his life, and when Louis XV died in 1774 he showed a strong disposition to take refuge in France, and would have done so if Louis XVI would have given him a promise of employment. His pension was continued.

It seems to be tolerably certain that at a later period he made a clean breast to the Emperor Francis II. His services at Constantinople were approved by Prince Kaunitz, who may possibly have been informed of the arrangement with the French secret diplomatic fund. It is never safe to decide whether these treasons were single or double. When Thugut was appointed internuncio he was also ennobled, being raised to the Ritterstand. After 1775 he travelled in France and Italy, partly on diplomatic service.

== Pre-Revolutionary period ==
In 1778 he was the agent through whom Maria Theresa entered into direct negotiations with Frederick the Great, in order to stop the Bavarian War. In 1780 he was Austrian envoy in Warsaw, but in 1783 he applied for leave and satisfied his hankering after France by living for four years in Paris.

It was in this time that his savings, made during his years of service at Constantinople, by means which would probably not bear investigation, were invested in France. Thugut became acquainted with many of the leaders in the French Revolution. From 1787 to 1789 he was minister at Naples, and showed great tact in managing the queen, Maria Carolina, a daughter of Maria Theresa. In 1790 he was sent by the Emperor Joseph II to Bucharest, nominally as commissioner with the hospodar of Wallachia, but in reality in order that he might open negotiations for peace with the Turks.

== Revolutionary wars ==
Until 1792 he was much in France and Belgium, partly as a diplomatic agent, but largely because he was anxious to rescue his investments, which were ultimately lost. His personal grievances may have had some share in creating the hatred of the Revolution and the Jacobins, for which he was afterwards famous.

In 1792 he was associated with Mercy-Argenteau, formerly Austrian ambassador in France, as diplomatic agent at the headquarters of the allied army. The mismanagement of the invasion of France excited his anger. He came back to Vienna to report the facts to Francis II, to whom he presented a statement on 27 December. On 19 January 1793 he was appointed armée-diplomat at headquarters, largely, it is said, by the intrigues of Philip Cobenzl and Spielmann, who wished to have him out of the way. But he never went, for at this time Russia and Prussia annexed large parts of Poland. Austria, entangled in the war with France, was left empty-handed.

The emperor, dissatisfied with the ministers who had not prevented this misfortune, dismissed them, and after some delay Thugut was named "director of the foreign affairs of Austria" on 25 March 1793. When Prince Kaunitz died in the following year Thugut was appointed to "discharge the duties of the office of house, court, and state chancellor." His promotion to the foremost place in the Austrian administration met with much opposition, and is known to have been largely due to the empress Maria Theresa of Naples. The Austrian government was by tradition very aristocratic. The empress Maria Theresa, grandmother of Francis II, though she valued the services of Thugut, had consented with reluctance to make him Commander of the Order of St Stephen, and had only yielded to the urgent requests of Kaunitz and of her son Joseph II. She thought the promotion excessive for a man of his plebeian origin. The nobles, who thought that the great offices of state should go to themselves, were of the same opinion. Thugut, who had a large fund of vanity, resented their insolence, and did nothing to disarm their hostility.

He was unmarried, and he avoided all society. In the discharge of his duties he took counsel with nobody. All the confidential work of his department was done by himself with the help of two clerks he could trust, and he took all important papers directly to the emperor, keeping no copies in his own office. He had his own experience to teach him how easy it was to bribe the officials of Austria. The nobles, who regarded themselves with good cause as the supporters of the Crown, and who expected to be consulted, resented his indifference and secrecy as the arrogance of an upstart. They were his constant enemies and critics. A few of them who admired his abilities supported him on personal grounds, but with these exceptions Thugut had no friends in Austria. Out of it, he was commonly regarded as the representative of all that was most unscrupulous and self-seeking in the methods of the Austrian government. He had inherited from his master Prince Kaunitz the firm conviction that Prussia was the worst enemy of Austria. From him, too, he had learnt that the first duty of an Austrian minister was to be an increaser of the empire, even at the expense of allies, and that excuses for annexation were to be made when they could not be found. His hatred of France, and of the Revolution, was no doubt sincere. But while prepared to defend Europe from French aggression, it was with the implied intention that Austria should be rewarded for her exertions by increases of territory, and should be made the absolute mistress of Germany.

The history of his policy from 1793 to 1800 touches much of the history of Europe. The conflicting objects which he kept before him, resistance to French aggression on the west, and to Russian and Prussian aggressions on the east, and the pursuit of more territory for Austria, compelled him to divide his exertions and his forces. Thus in 1793–94 he recalled troops from the west to participate in a partition of Poland, thereby taking pressure off France, and doing much to smooth the way for her subsequent victories. Some of his actions cannot be described as other than criminal. He was certainly responsible for the murderous attack on the French envoys at Rastadt in April 1799. He may have intended that they should only be robbed, but he must be held responsible for the acts of his agents. So again he has to answer for the perverse policy of Austria in 1799 when Suvarov and the Russians were recalled from northern Italy for no visible reason except that Austria should be left in sole possession of the dominions of the king of Sardinia, with a good excuse for keeping them.

The correspondence of Joseph de Maistre shows how bitterly the continental allies of Austria resented her selfishness, and how firmly they were persuaded that she was fighting for her own hand. That Thugut believed that he was doing his duty, and that he was carrying on the traditional policy of Austria, may be true. Yet his methods were so extreme, and his attitude so provocative as to justify the judgment passed on him by Kaunitz namely, that he required the control of a strong hand if good results were to be obtained from his ability.

After the defeats of Austria in Italy in 1796–97 and the peace of Campo Formio, it became a fixed object with the French, and with a growing party in Austria who held him responsible for the disasters of the war, to secure the removal of Thugut. He found no support, except from the British government, which considered him, as a sure ally and had great influence at Vienna as paymaster of subsidies. The death of the empress Catherine of Russia deprived him of a friend at court.

== End of career ==
During the campaigns of 1799 and 1800 Thugut was the advocate of war "to the knife". At the end he was kept in office only by the vigorous support of England. The battle of Hohenlinden on 3 December 1800 made his position untenable. He retired from public life, and left Vienna for Pressburg on 27 March 1801. At a later period he returned to Vienna and lived quietly on a pension of 7000 florins until his death on 28 May 1818.

== See also ==
- List of Austrian ambassadors to Turkey
