= Philipp von Cobenzl =

Habsburg diplomat (1741–1810)

His Illustrious Highness The Count of Cobenzl
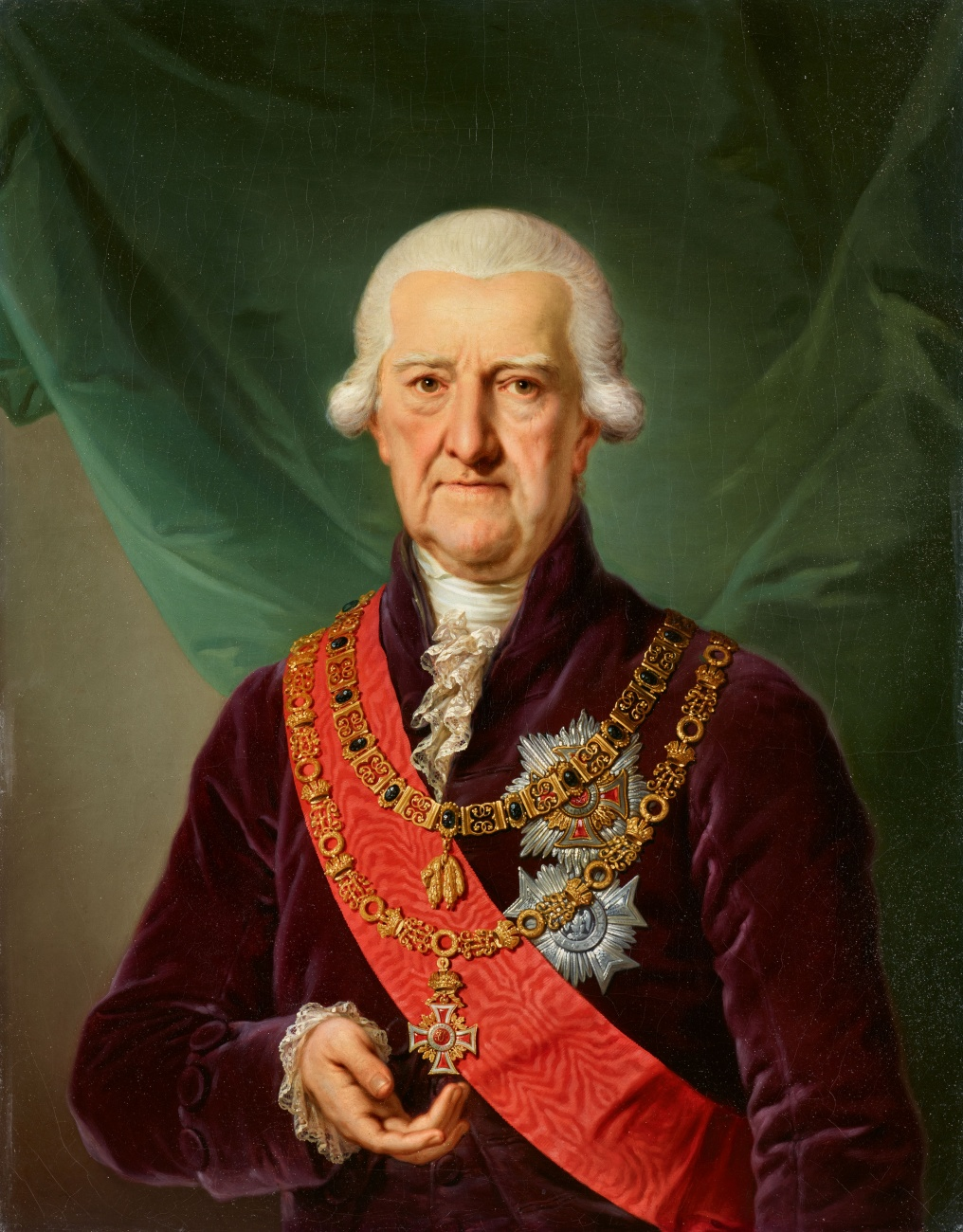
- Cobenzl with various insignia, including the collar of the Order of the Golden Fleece

State Chancellor of the Habsburg monarchy
- In office 19 August 1792 – 27 March 1793
- Monarch: Francis II
- Preceded by: Wenzel Anton, Prince of Kaunitz-Rietberg
- Succeeded by: Johann Amadeus Francis de Paula, Baron of Thugut

Personal details
- Born: 28 May 1741 Ljubljana, Duchy of Carniola
- Died: 30 August 1810 (aged 69) Vienna

Johann Philipp, Graf von Cobenzl (28 May 1741 – 30 August 1810) was a statesman of the Habsburg monarchy and the Austrian Empire.

== Life ==
Cobenzl was born in Ljubljana, Carniola, the son of treasurer Count Guidobald von Cobenzl (1716–1797) and his wife Countess Maria Benigna von Montrichier (1720–1793). The Cobenzl family, of Carinthian origin, was elevated to Freiherren noble rank in 1588 and raised to Imperial Counts in 1722. His uncle Johann Karl Philipp von Cobenzl was the Habsburg plenipotentiary in the Austrian Netherlands and his cousin Count Ludwig von Cobenzl (1753–1809) served as Foreign Minister of the Habsburg monarchy from 1801 to 1805. His father Guidobald von Cobenzl lived mostly in Gorizia, where he was a great supporter of culture and arts.

Philipp von Cobenzl grew up in Gorizia and at Predjama Castle (Burg Lueg) near Postojna (Adelsberg). He joined the Habsburg diplomatic service. In 1777 he accompanied Emperor Joseph II (in the disguise of a "Count Falkenstein") on his visit to his sister Queen Marie Antoinette in France. Immediately afterwards, Cobenzl travelled to Berlin as a Habsburg envoy, but was not able to prevent the Prussian king Frederic the Great from entering the War of the Bavarian Succession. In 1779 he concluded the Peace of Teschen and assumed the office of an Austrian vice-chancellor, eventually succeeding State Chancellor Prince Wenzel Anton of Kaunitz-Rietberg in 1792. However, already in March 1793 upon discords regarding the Second Partition of Poland, he had to resign from office in favour of Baron Johann Amadeus Francis de Paula von Thugut.

From 1801 Cobenzl worked as Habsburg ambassador in Paris. He retired in 1805, and then lived in his Döbling residence north of Vienna. He was a patron of the arts, acquainted with Wolfgang Amadeus Mozart, and greatly contributed to the education and career of the Slovenian Neoclassicist painter Franz Caucig.

In 1809, he informed Napoleon Bonaparte about the demographics of the newly established Illyrian Provinces.

Upon his death, the Cobenzl noble dynasty became extinct. He was buried in the Vienna St. Marx Cemetery. A street in the Döbling district was named after him in 1894.

== See also ==
- Ludwig von Cobenzl
- Johann Karl Philipp von Cobenzl
