= Predjama =

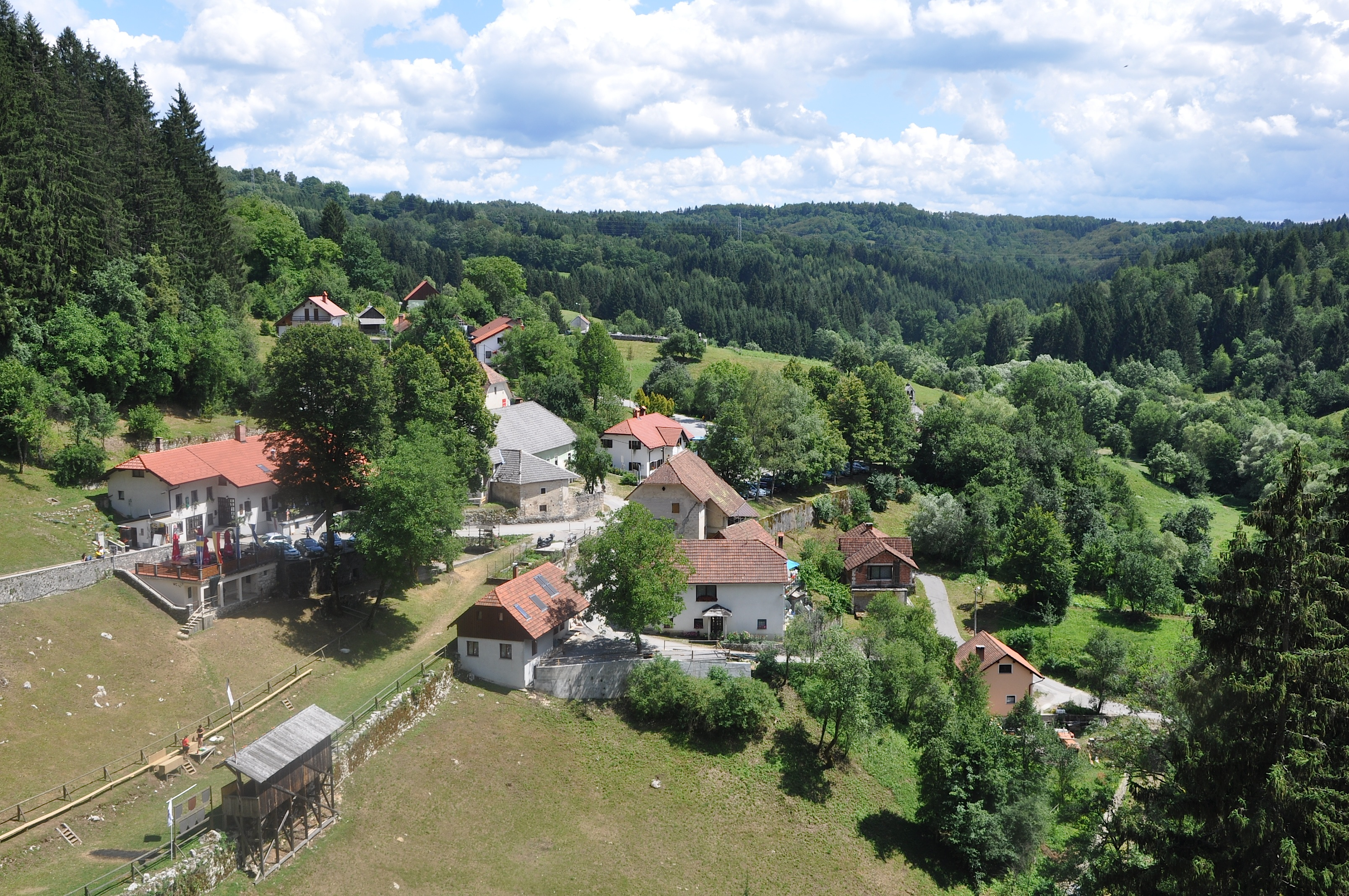

- Location in Slovenia
- Coordinates: 45°48′52.45″N 14°7′41.95″E
- Country: Slovenia
- Traditional region: Inner Carniola
- Statistical region: Littoral–Inner Carniola
- Municipality: Postojna

Area
  - Total: 13.18 km^{2} (5.09 sq mi)
- Elevation: 508.8 m (1,669 ft)

Population (2002)
  - Total: 85

Predjama (pronounced [pɾɛdˈjaːma]; German: Luegg, Italian: Castel Lueghi) is a small settlement in the Municipality of Postojna in the Inner Carniola region of Slovenia.

== Landmarks ==
=== Castle ===
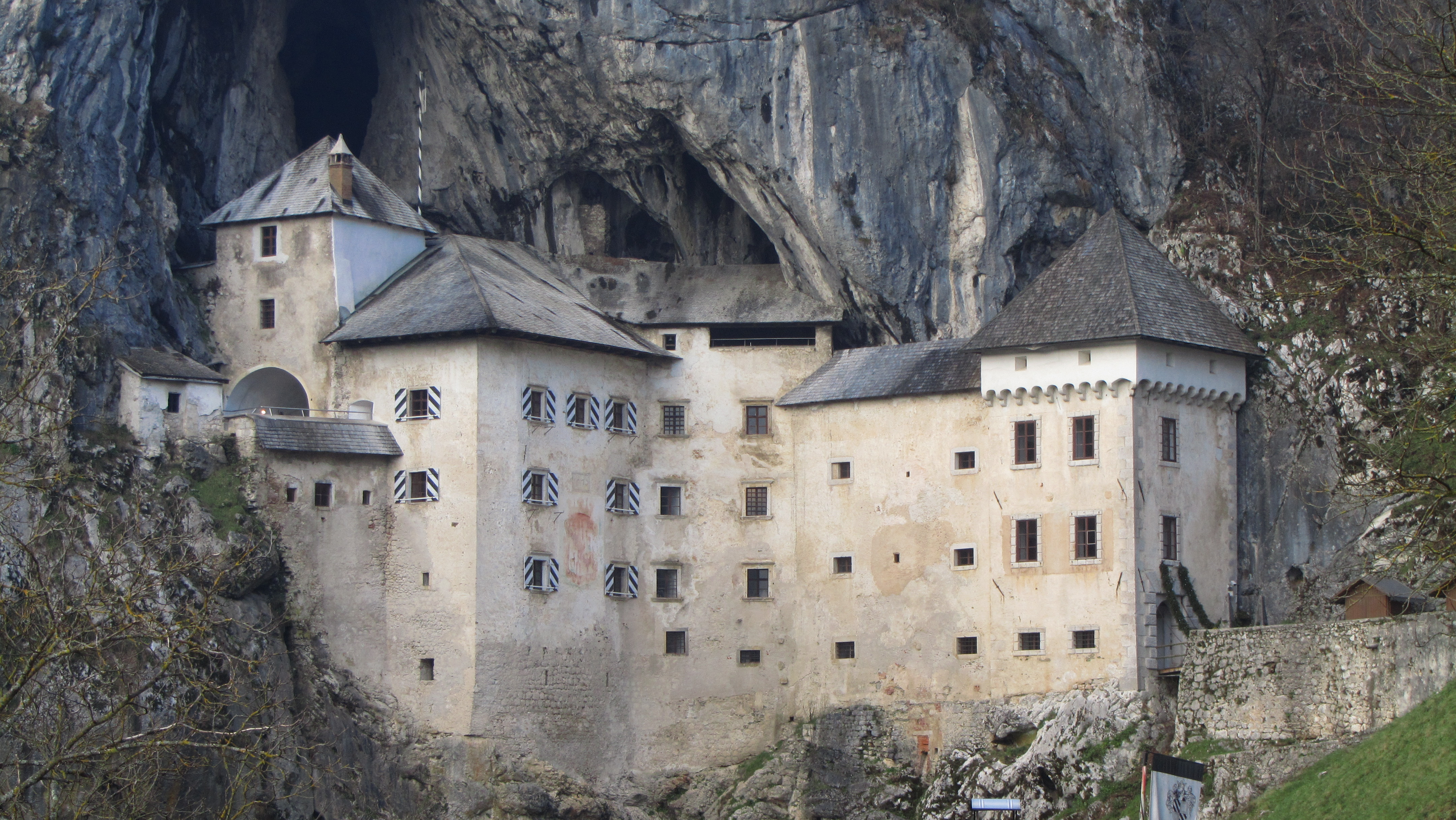
Predjama Castle

Predjama Castle, a Renaissance castle and a major tourist attraction in Slovenia, is located at the mouth of a cave just above the settlement.

=== Church ===
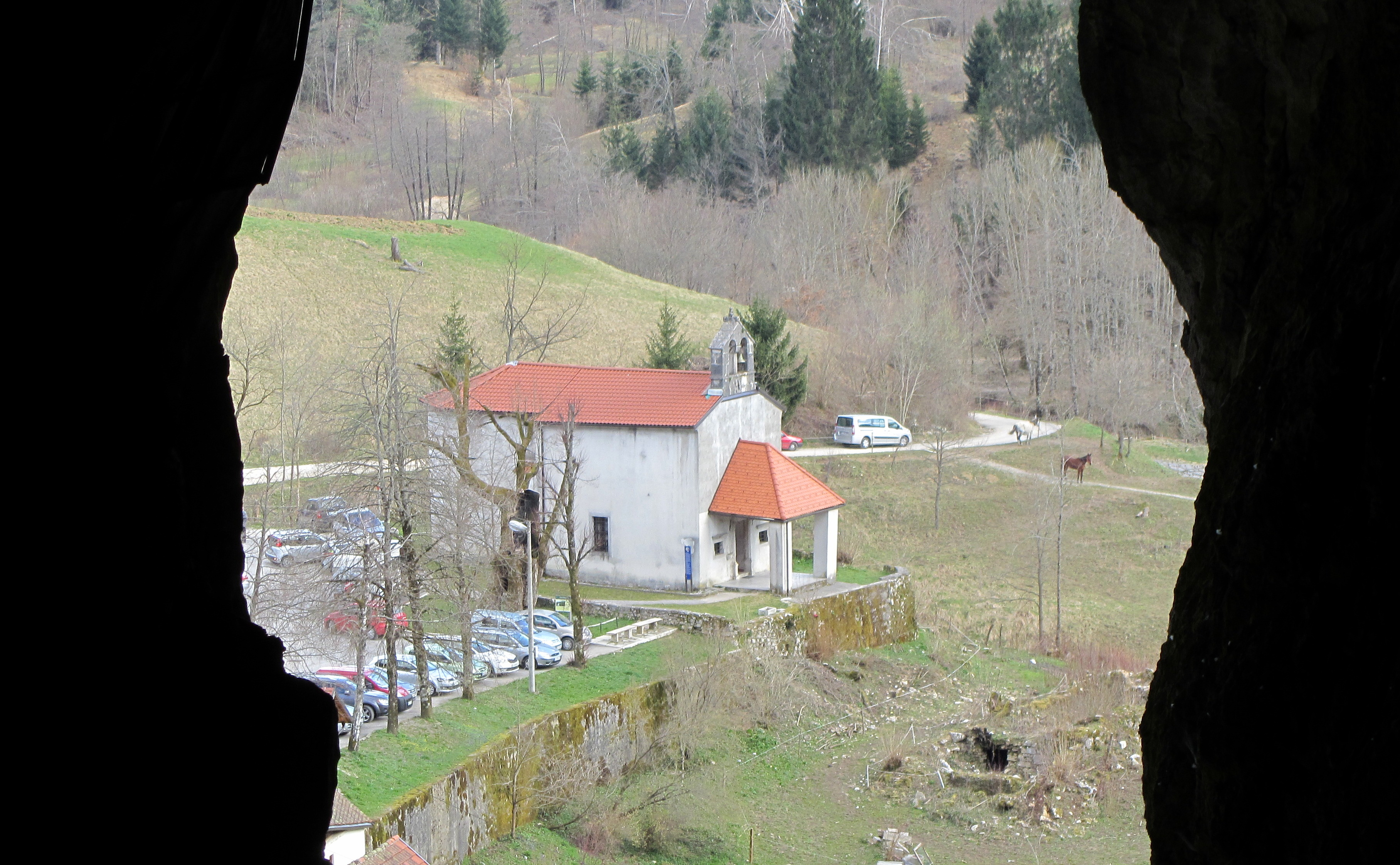
Our Lady of Sorrows Church

Our Lady of Sorrows Church in the settlement is a chapel of ease of the Parish of Studeno. It is a single-nave Gothic church painted with frescos from c. 1460 that was built at the end of the 15th century. It has been protected as a cultural monument of national significance.
