= Ludwig von Cobenzl =

Austrian politician (1753–1809)

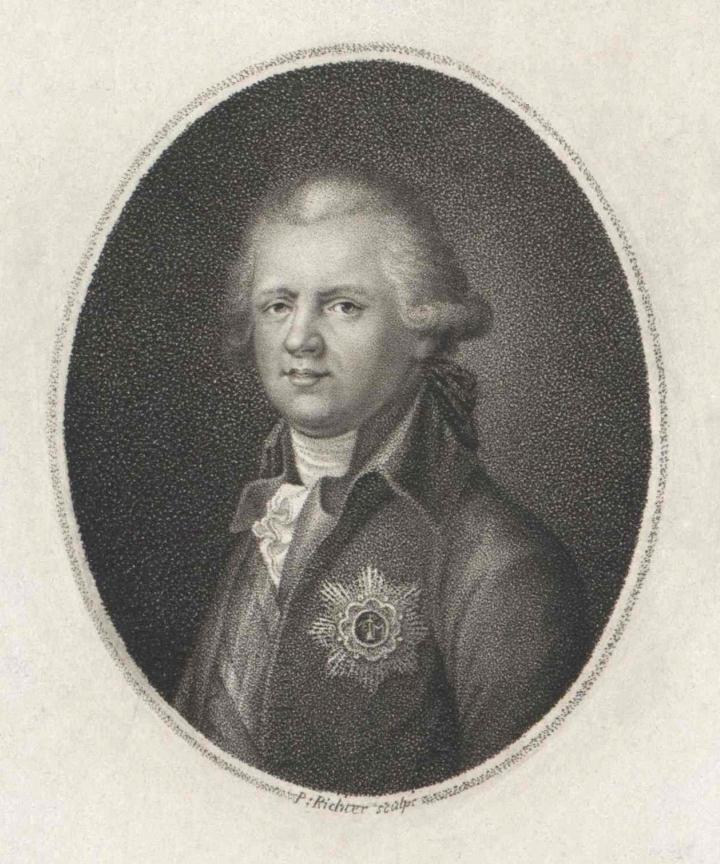
Engraving by P. Richter

Cobenzl's signature

Johann Ludwig Joseph, Graf von Cobenzl (21 November 1753 – 22 February 1809) was a diplomat and politician of the Habsburg monarchy. He served as the State Chancellor of the Habsburg monarchy from 18 September 1801 to the 25 December 1805.

Von Cobenzl was born in Brussels in 1753 as one out of ten children to Count Johann Karl Philipp von Cobenzl (1712–1770), the plenipotentiary minister of the Empress Maria Theresia in the Austrian Netherlands. His brother-in-law, François de la Woestyne, 3rd Marquess of Becelaere was executed by Guillotine in Cambrai. He also was a cousin of the diplomat Philipp Graf von Cobenzl, and a protégé of Wenzel Anton von Kaunitz. In 1779, he became minister at St. Petersburg.

In 1795, during the Third Partition of Poland, he negotiated a large portion of land for the Habsburg Monarchy that had gone empty in the Second Partition.

In 1800, he conducted negotiations in Paris to end the War of the Second Coalition. Unaware of the Armistice of Treviso signed a week earlier, he surrendered Mantua to the French on 26 January 1801. He signed the Treaty of Lunéville on 9 February. In 1801, he became the foreign minister of the Habsburg Monarchy. As such, he recognized the imperial title of Napoleon. In 1805, the Austrian Empire took part in the War of the Third Coalition, and was defeated at the Battle of Austerlitz, which led to Cobenzl's dismissal.

Cobenzl was a member of the Illuminati under the name of Arrian. He died, aged 55, in Vienna.
