= Erasmus of Lueg =

15th c. Slovenian noble

Erasmus of Lueg (German: Erasmus von Lueg, Erasmus Lueger; Slovene: Erazem Predjamski) was a burgrave of Predjama Castle in the 15th century and a renowned robber baron.

== Early life ==
He was the son of the Imperial Governor of Trieste, Nikolaj Lueger.

== Rogue ==
According to legend, in 1483 he killed Marshall Pappenheim at the Vienna Court during an argument in which Pappenheim had offended the honor of Erasmus's dead friend, Andreas Baumkircher of Vipava. However, Pappenheim was a relative of Holy Roman Emperor Frederick III so Erasmus fled to his castle, Predjama, to escape punishment. He then allied himself with the Hungarian King Matthias Corvinus and started to attack Habsburg estates and towns in Carniola. Emperor Fredrick III sent the governor of Trieste, Gaspar Ravbar, to besiege Predjama Castle. Ravbar tried to starve Erasmus to death, but Erasmus survived on food delivered via a secret tunnel through the cave system under the castle.

Erasmus was killed after a long siege. According to a popular but unfounded legend, Erasmus was betrayed by one of his men and was killed while in his room, on a toilet, or in his garderobe, by a shot from a cannon or catapult.
