= François III Maximilien de la Woestyne, 3rd Marquess of Becelaere =

Victim of the French Revolution

François III Maximilien de la Woestyne, 3rd Marquess of Becelaere, Grande of Spain and Lord of Walincourt (died 12 May 1794 in Cambrai) was a victim of the French Revolution.

== Family ==
His father was Maximilien de la Woestyne, heir of the Flemish house of La Woestyne and his mother was Isabella de Ghelinck. He married in 1758 to Marie Eleonore, daughter of count Johann Karl Philipp von Cobenzl. From this marriage his successor is born: Charles de la Woestyne, 4th Marquess of Becelaere, born in Brussel 1759. Eleonore died in 1771 (or 1776). The marquess remarried his chambermaid, Marguerite Bonnefond. In 1763 he became the 3rd Marquess of Becelaere after the death of his father. He took residence to keep his estate in France, and did not leave. His children did flee the country when the revolution became too dangerous.

The family name obviously refers to the village now named Beselare, in the town of Zonnebeke.

== Execution ==
During this time, the Marquess took residence in Cambrai. The family resided in the Hotel de Becelaer since 1746, where he was arrested on the night of 22 Floréal. The marquess was sentenced in Arras as treasoner to the republic and condemned to death on behalf of Joseph Le Bon. The marquess explained that he renounces his feodal titles, and renounces his old privileges. He explained that he did marry a simple commoner. His judges replied: "Ce n'est pas la truie qui démarquise, c'est le cochon qui ennoblit."

The judges had no mercy: the couple were to be executed by guillotine.

The abbé Boniface testifies that this execution was horrible: because the knife had executed so many people they had to pull the axe up three times. The people witnessed the Marquess still alive and continuously crying until the end.

Historical records state that the couple were the only ones executed on that day.
