= Joseph Pichler (painter) =

Austrian painter

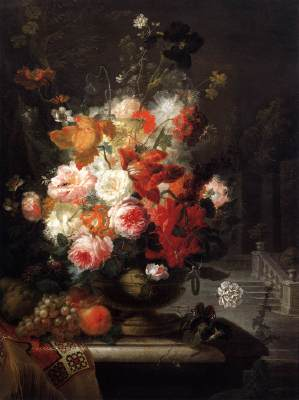
Flower Piece (1778)

Joseph Pichler (May 9, 1730 – December 15, 1808) was an Austrian painter, best known for his frescoes.

Pichler was born in the Carinthian village of Kötschach, which he left in 1752 to study at the Academy of Fine Arts in Vienna. Pichler remained primarily known for the frescoes commissioned by his long-time client Wenzel Anton, Prince of Kaunitz-Rietberg. Pichler applied frescoes in Kaunitz's Slavkov Castle (located in Slavkov u Brna), the castle's chapel, and the Palais Kaunitz-Wittgenstein, where he painted the frescoes in the stairwell and the banquet hall. Pichler also worked for the Habsburg royal family, for whom he created the frescoes in the so-called Blauer Hof and probably also in adjunct buildings in their summer residence in Laxenburg. As a reward for his work, Pichler was ennobled.

In 1808, Pichler died in Lerchenfeld, which used to be an independent municipality but is nowadays in the territory of Vienna.
