= Palais Kaunitz-Wittgenstein =

Palace in Laxenburg

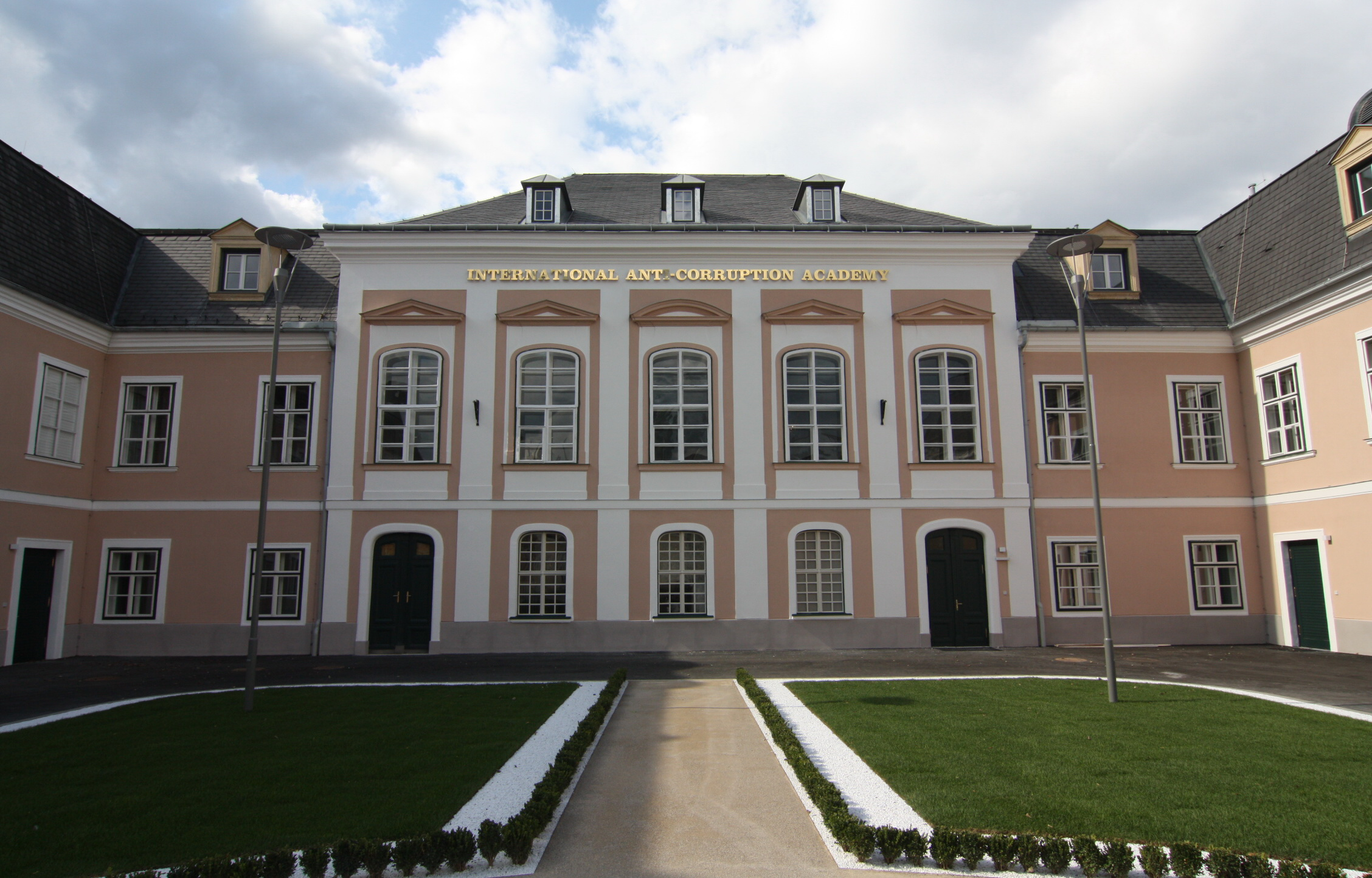
The Palais Kaunitz in 2011

The Palais Kaunitz-Wittgenstein (at Münchendorferstraße 2) is a Baroque palace built in 1703 in Laxenburg, Lower Austria. Initially used as a summer residence, the palace also served as a museum, an educational institute, and a community center. Since 2010 the palace is the headquarters of the International Anti-Corruption Academy (IACA).

== History ==
In 1695, Leopold Philip Montecuccoli purchased an undeveloped plot of land in Laxenburg and began the construction of a house. The precise whereabouts of this construction remain obscure. After his death in 1698, his widow sold the estate to Dominik Andreas I. von Kaunitz, who commissioned the palace, which was built in the years 1698–1703. Kaunitz additionally purchased neighbouring plots of land and connected them with his estate to enlarge the palace and the gardens. Domenico Martinelli, who also planned Slavkov Castle for Kaunitz, is the likely architect of the palace. His participation, however, has not been proven. The construction took place under the auspices of Andrea Simone Carove, while Pietro Bombelli served as a stonemason.

After Kaunitz' death, the palace was sold in 1722 by his son Maximilian Ulrich Kaunitz-Rietberg to Leopold Schlick, due to financial reasons. The Palais Kaunitz was, in the aftermath, owned in fast succession by members of the families Schlick, Lobkowicz, Chotek, and subsequently served as a summer residence to the piemont ambassador at the imperial court in Vienna Luigi Canale. During the period of Canale's residence in the Palais, it was frequently visited by the librettist and poet Pietro Metastasio, who used to spend the summer there. Wenzel Anton, Prince of Kaunitz-Rietberg, the grandson of the palace's first owner, bought the palace in 1775. Wenzel Anton Kaunitz refurbished the palace and established the current neoclassical interior. Kaunitz commissioned the frescoes in the stairwell and the banquet hall to the Austrian painter Joseph Pichler, who was also working at the Laxenburg castles

After his death, Kaunitz' heirs sold the palace in 1803 to the Austrian foreign minister Franz de Paula Karl von Colloredo, who commissioned new refurbishments, including a bathhouse with paintings. Colloredo died in 1806 leading to the next change in ownership, as his widow sold the palace to Nikolaus II, Prince Esterházy in 1808. Nikolaus located his art collection in the palace and established it as a museum.

In 1895, after the death of Nikolaus III the palace was bought by members of the Wittgenstein family, who might have already rented the house in the years prior to their purchase. The palace remained in the possession of, inter alia, Klara Wittgenstein and her brothers Ludwig and Paul, serving since 1910 as the primary home to Klara. After Klara Wittgenstein's death, a nearby order of nuns acquired the building and started to run several educational institutes in the palace, before it was reassigned to serve as a community center. The Palais Kaunitz-Wittgenstein is currently in the possession of the Austrian state and rented by IACA for the symbolic price of €1 per year.

== Sources ==
- Springer, Elisabeth (2013). Formann, Barbara (ed.). Laxenburg : Juwel vor den Toren Wiens (in German). Verlag Bibliothek der Provinz. ISBN 9783990281932.
