= Leopold Philip Montecuccoli =

Austrian general

Leopold Philip Fürst Montecuccoli (1663 – 6 January 1698) was an Austrian general.

Leopold Philip Montecuccoli was the son of the famous Imperial Field Marshal Raimondo Montecuccoli and Countess Maria Margareta von Dietrichstein (1637–1676), daughter of Max von Dietrichstein, Oberhofmeister of Ferdinand III, Holy Roman Emperor.

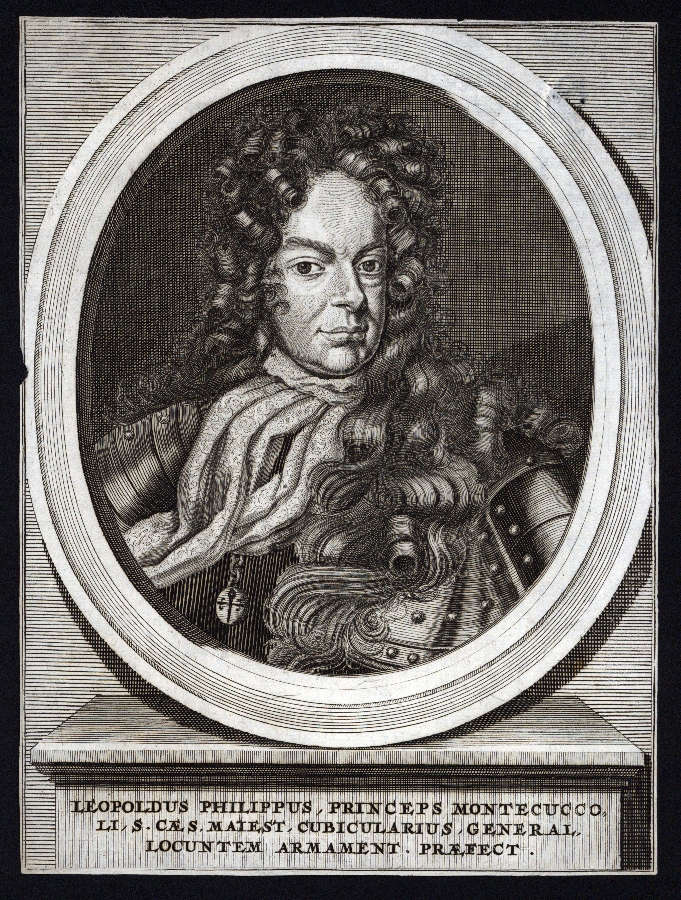
Leopold Philipp Montecuccoli

Like his father, Leopold Philip entered the service of the Imperial Army. When his father died in 1680, he took over command as Colonel of his Cuirassier-Regiment and became later Field Marshal-Lieutenant. He also became captain of the Imperial Trabanten-Leibgarde, Geheimrat and Knight in the Order of the Golden Fleece. In 1689, his title was raised to Reichsfürst. In 1695 Montecuccoli purchased a plot of land in the area of Laxenburg in order to establish a summer residence close to the Habsburg family's castles there. This plot was developed further after his death and is now known under the name Palais Kaunitz-Wittgenstein.

He married Countess Maria Antonia Colloredo. When he died in 1698 at the age of 35, since he had no children, his title became extinct.
