= Franzensburg =

Castle in Laxenburg, Lower Austria

Coordinates: 48°03′55″N 16°22′19″E

- Lower Austria, Austria
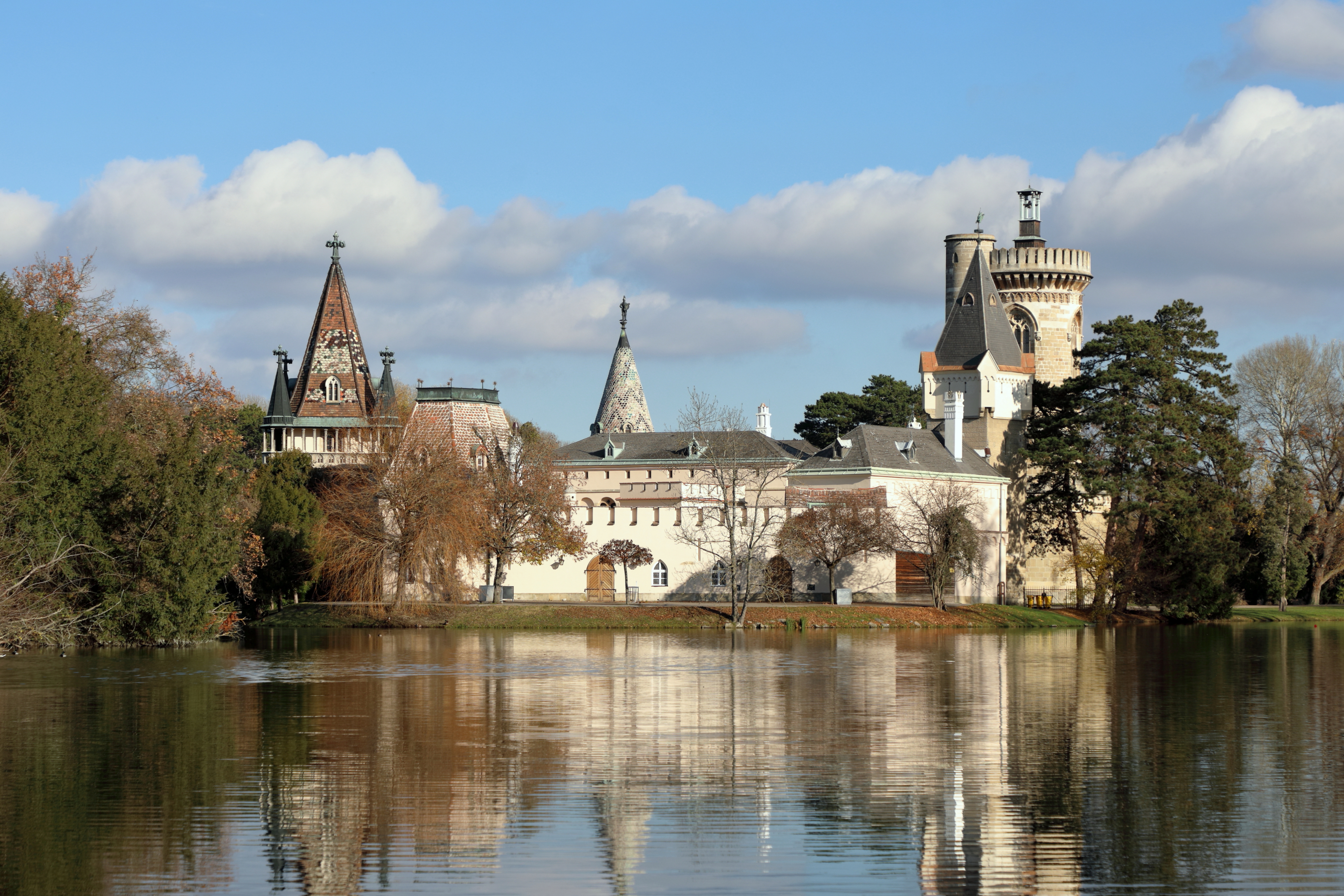

Site history
- Built: 1801 - 1836

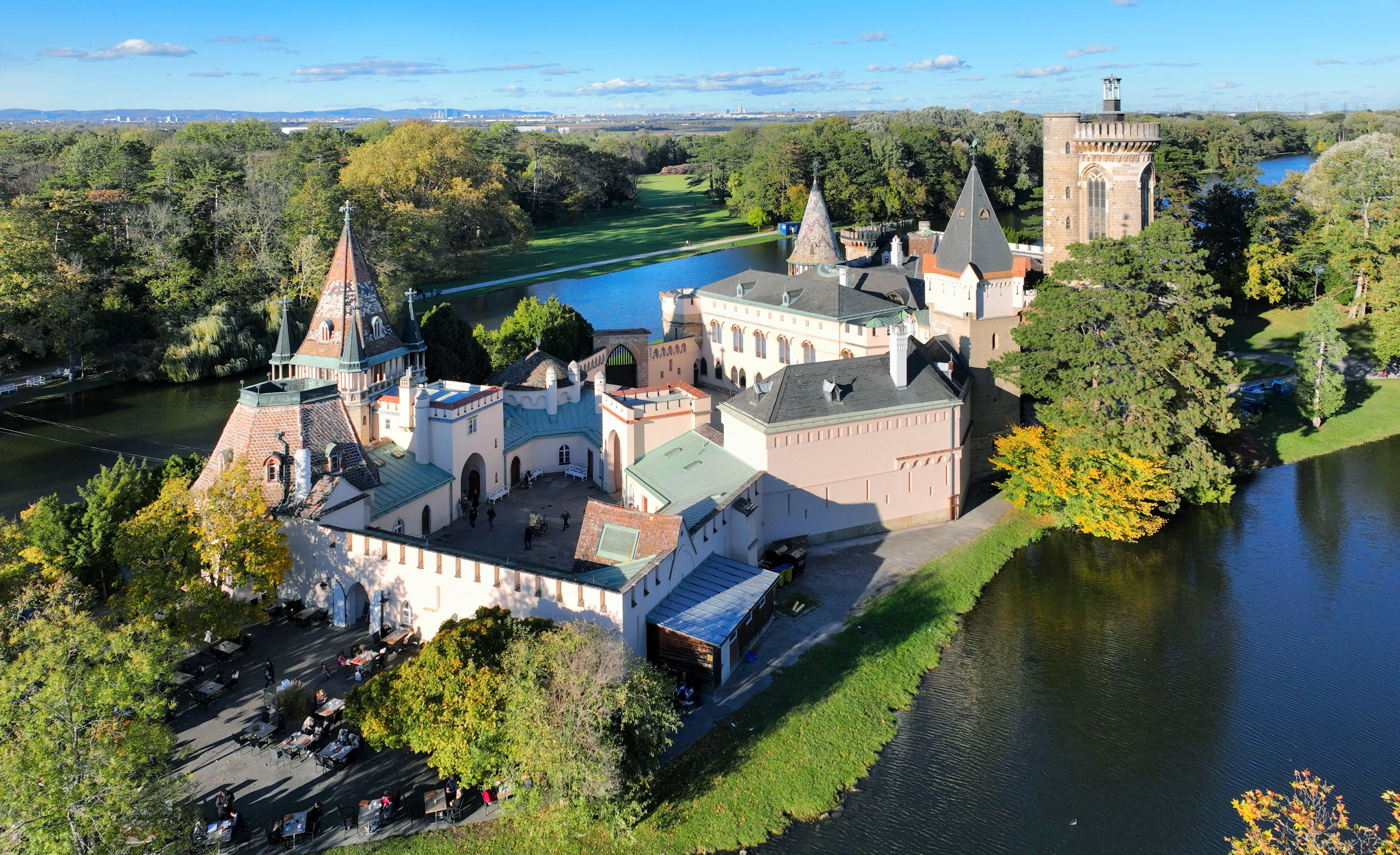
Aerial view of the Franzensburg

Franzensburg is a medieval style castle in Laxenburg, Lower Austria, Austria.

Built between 1801 and 1836, it was named in memory of the last Holy Roman Emperor, Francis II, who died in 1835.

== History ==
The Franzensburg castle is the best-known building in the Laxenburg Castles Park. The castle is named after Emperor Francis II, who erected this in 1798–1801. Francis II was responsible for the construction of this reproduction of a medieval knights castle on an artificial island in the middle of the castles pond. The equipment of these premises is considered to be the Austrian treasure-house. Franzensburg Castle is a masterpiece of romantic classicism in the Neo-gothic style. Several magnificent extensions were carried out up until the year 1835, including the outer courtyard or the castle with the imaginative ancestors gallery in the form of sandstone busts. Thanks to a variety of purchases and donations, inside there are magnificent ranging from coffered ceilings and marble flooring to leather hangings and much more besides.

Today the castle is a museum.

== Views of the Castle ==
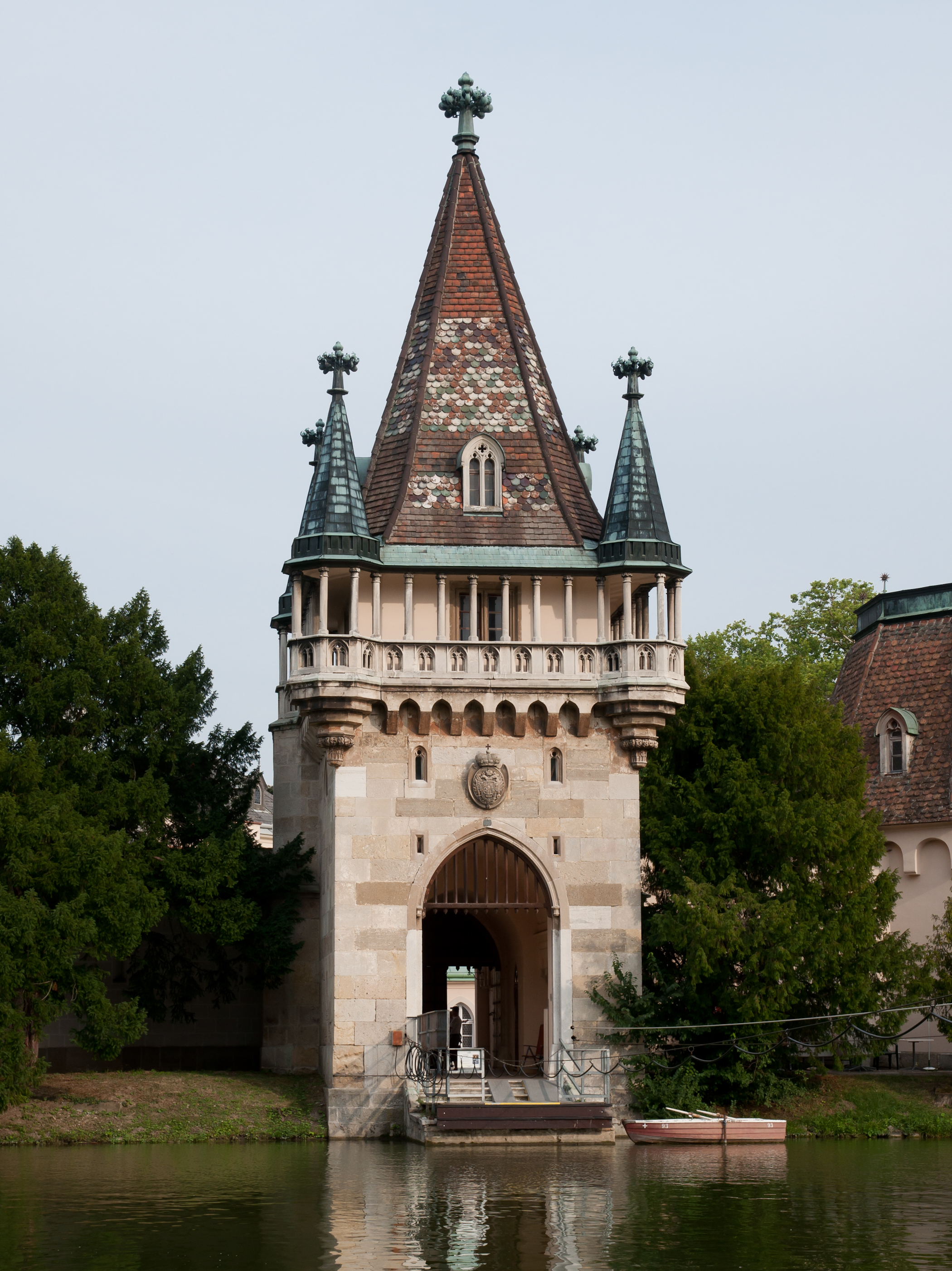
Tower gate

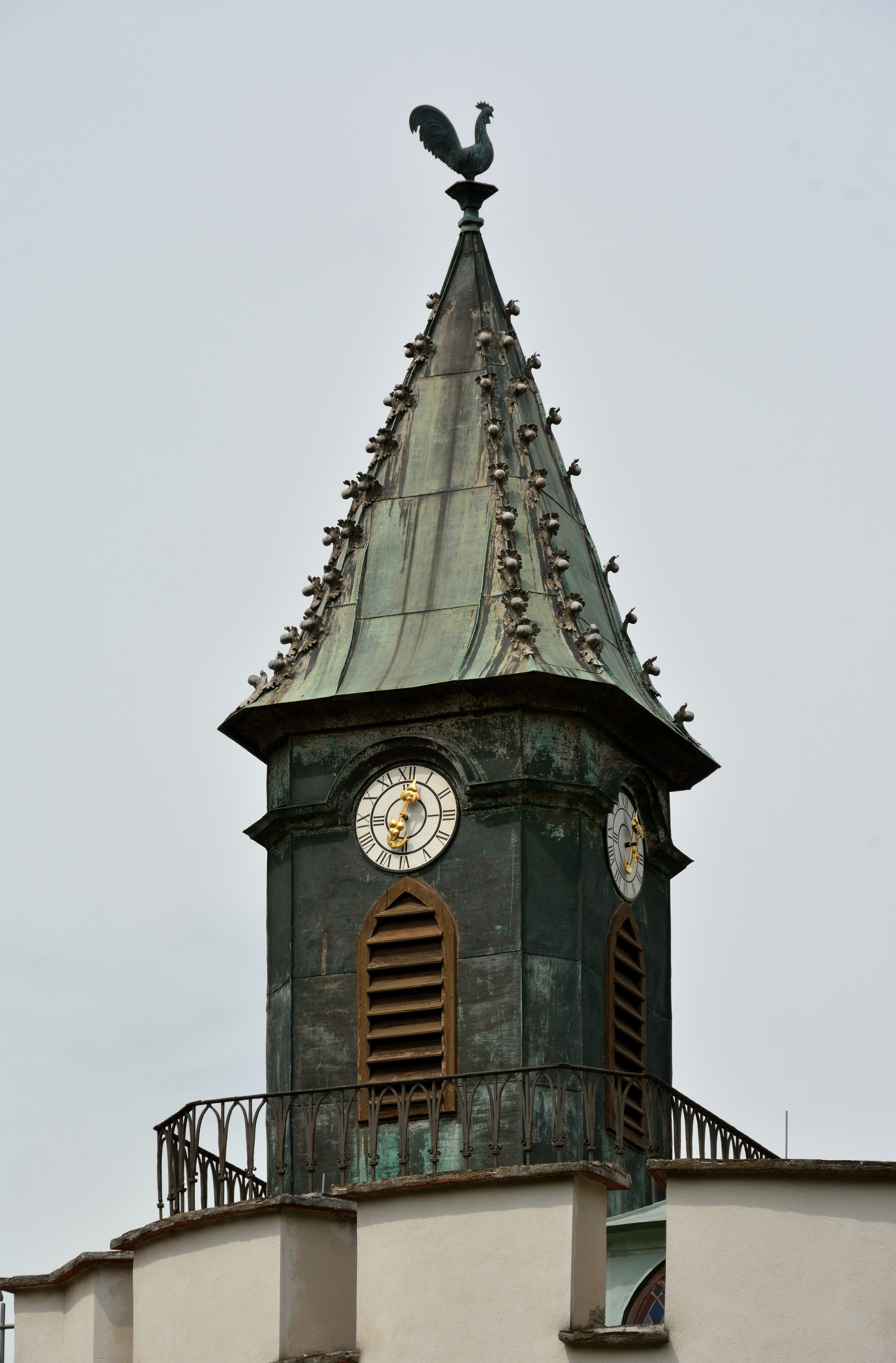
Clock tower

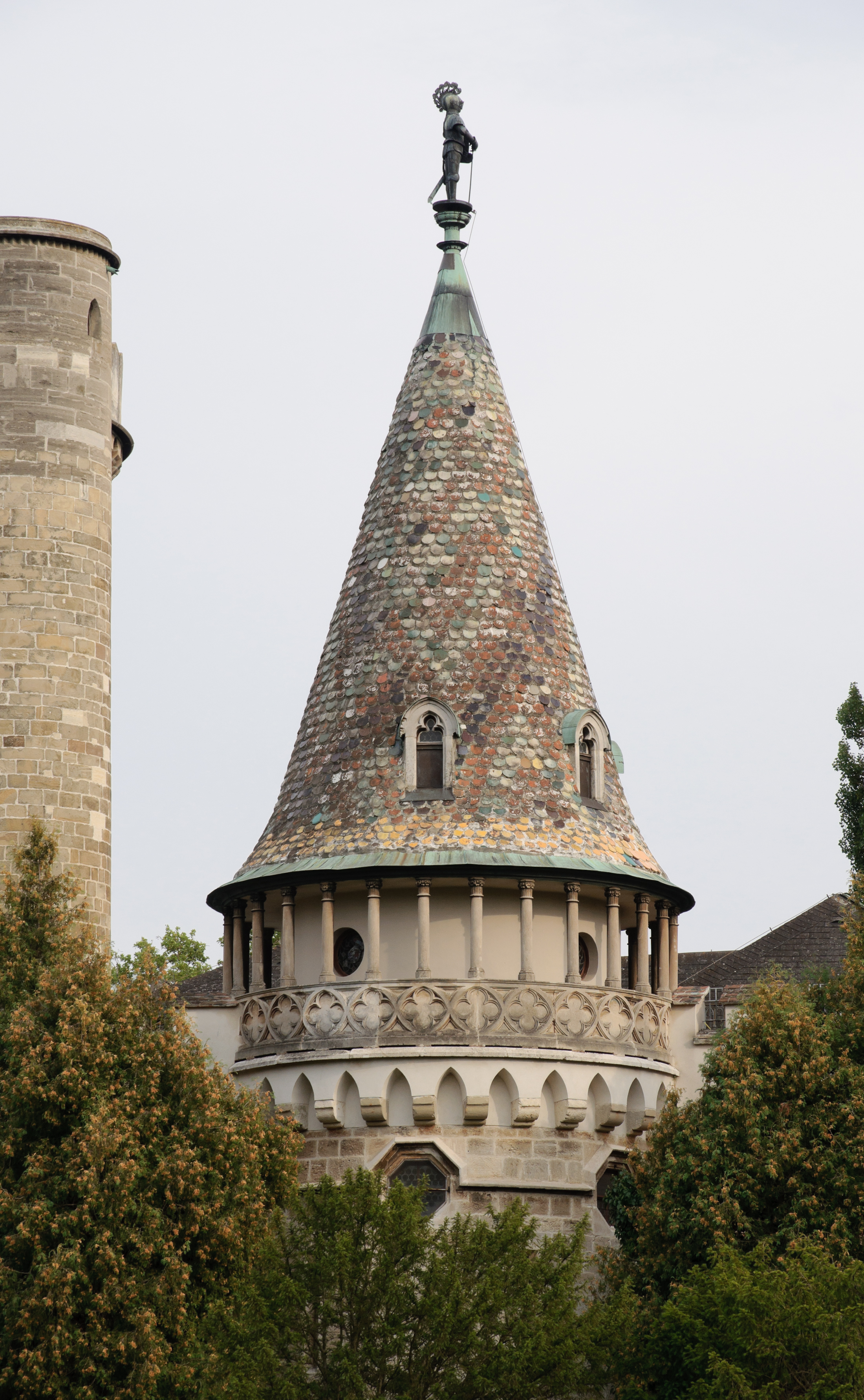
Tower

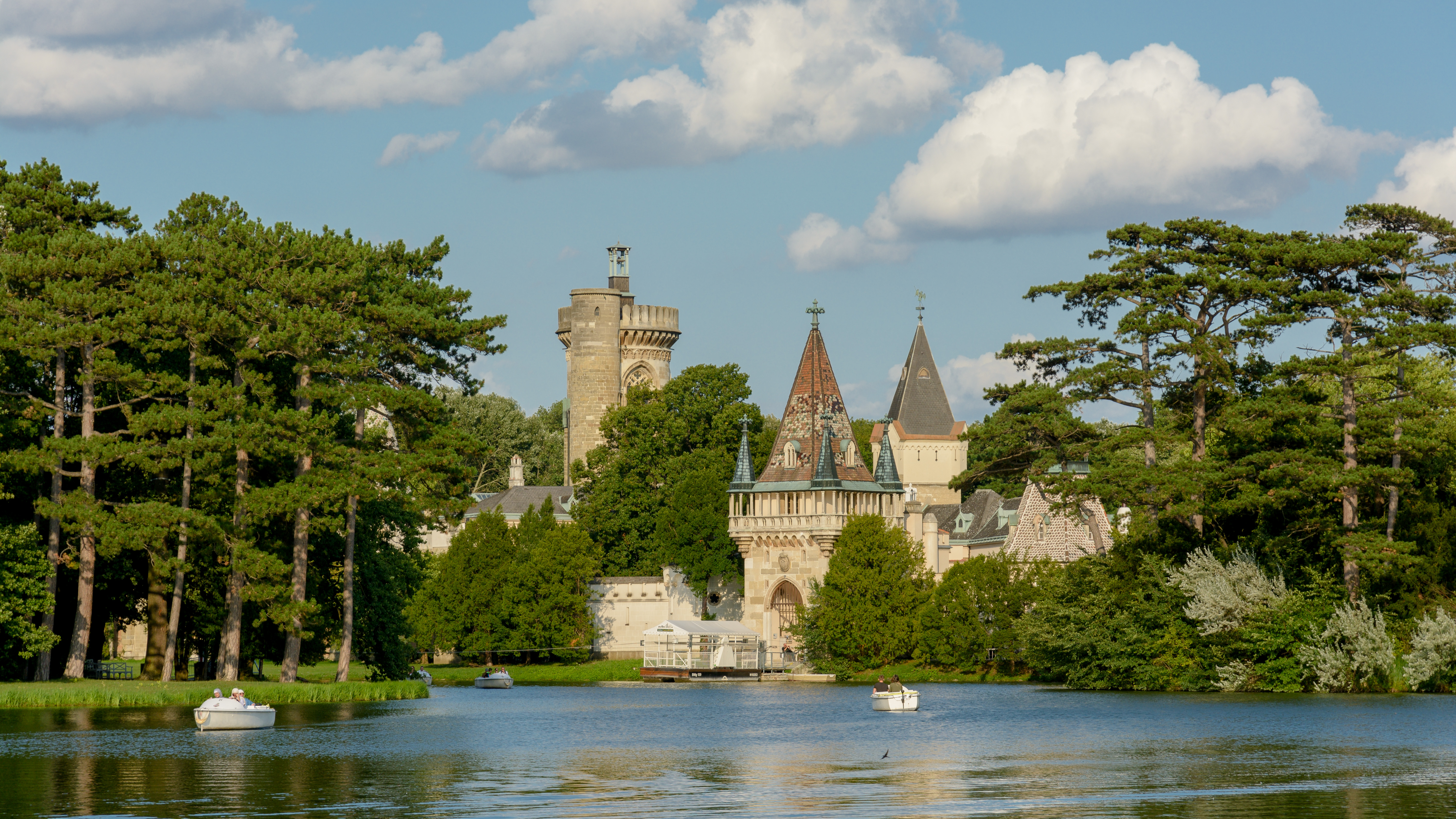
Castle and pond

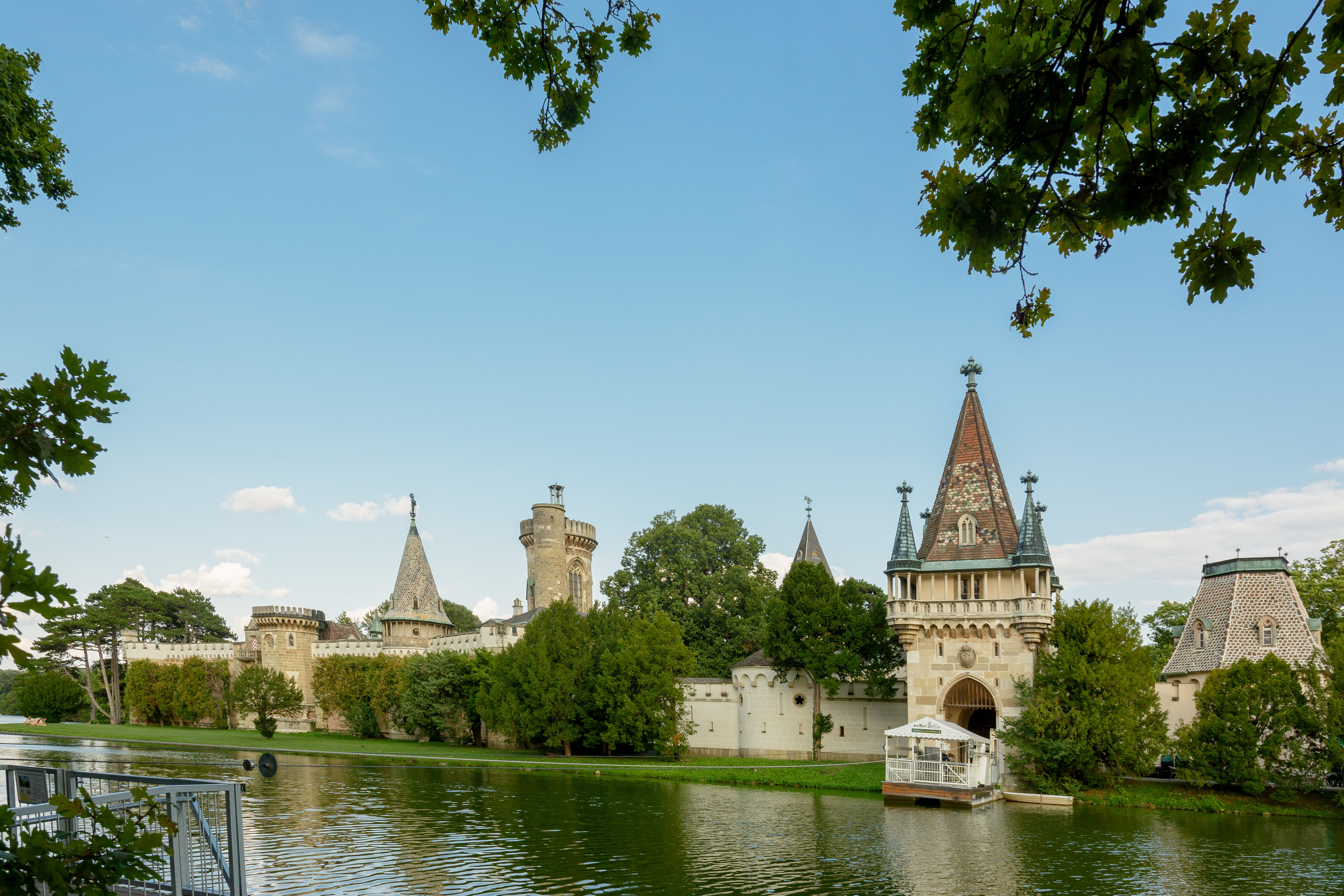
Castle view

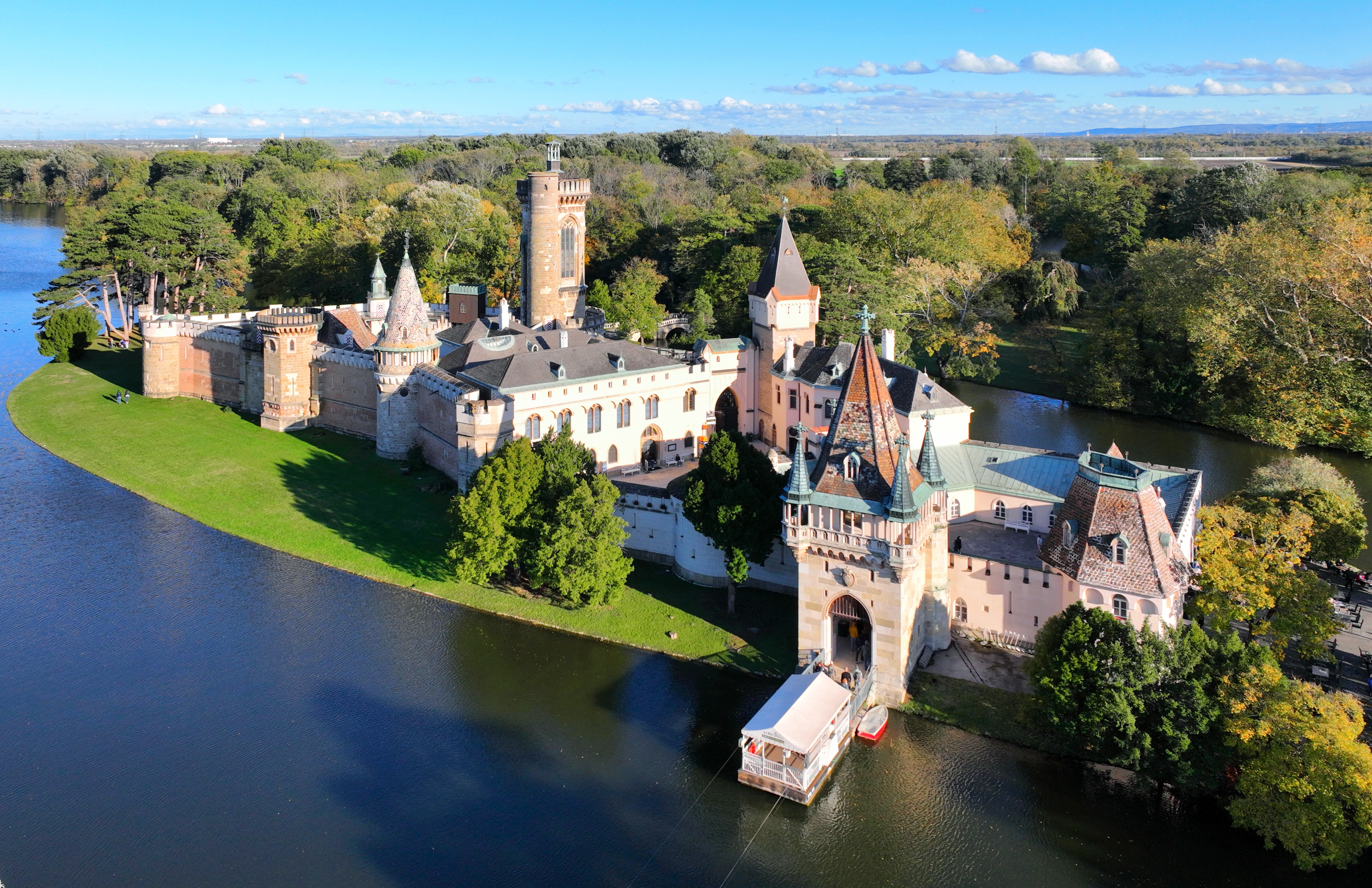
West view

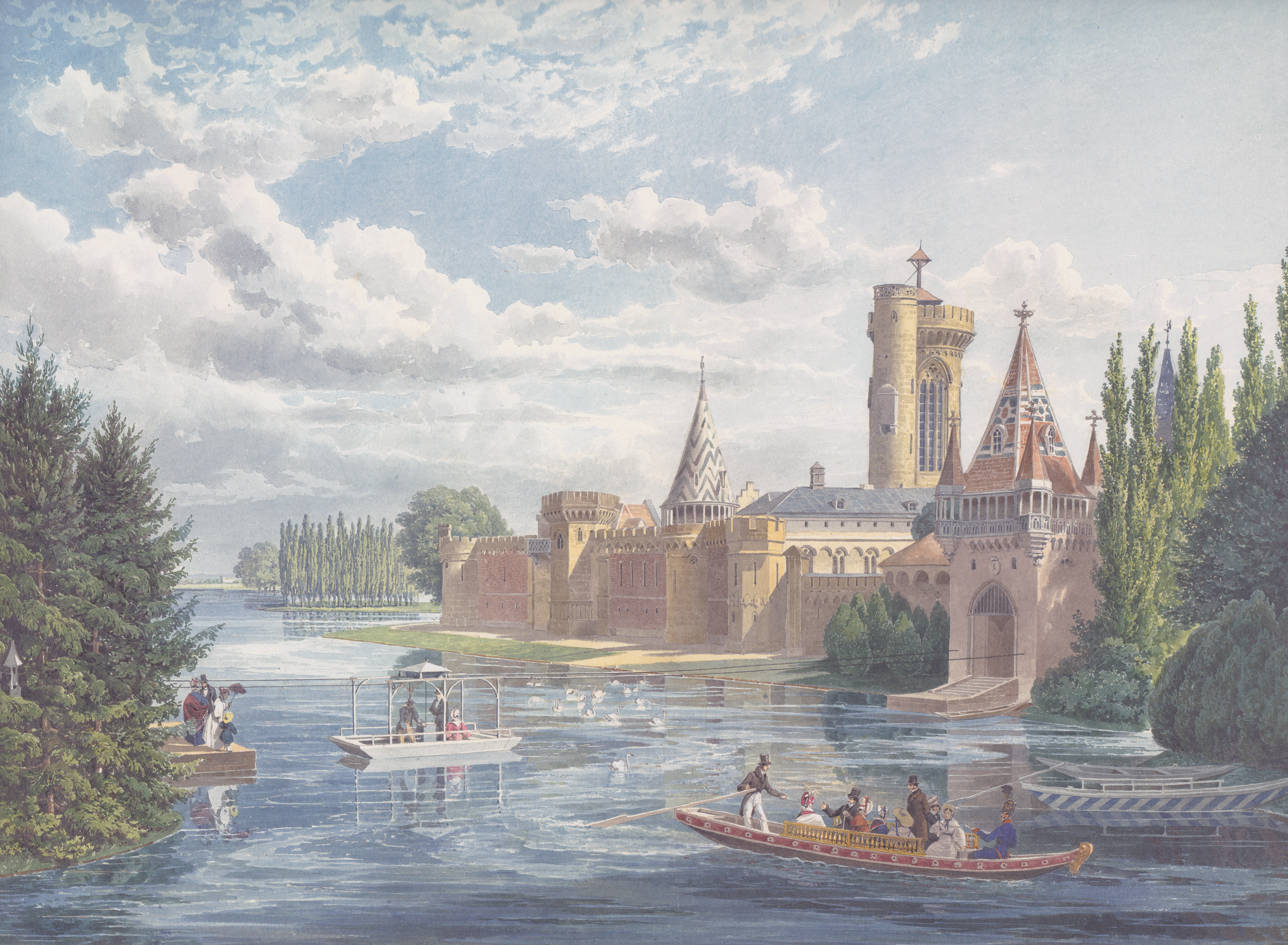
Die Franzensburg in Laxenburg bei Wien by Eduard Gurk, 1838

== See also ==
- List of castles in Austria
