= Slavkov Castle =

Coordinates: 49°9′17.42″N 16°52′27.18″E

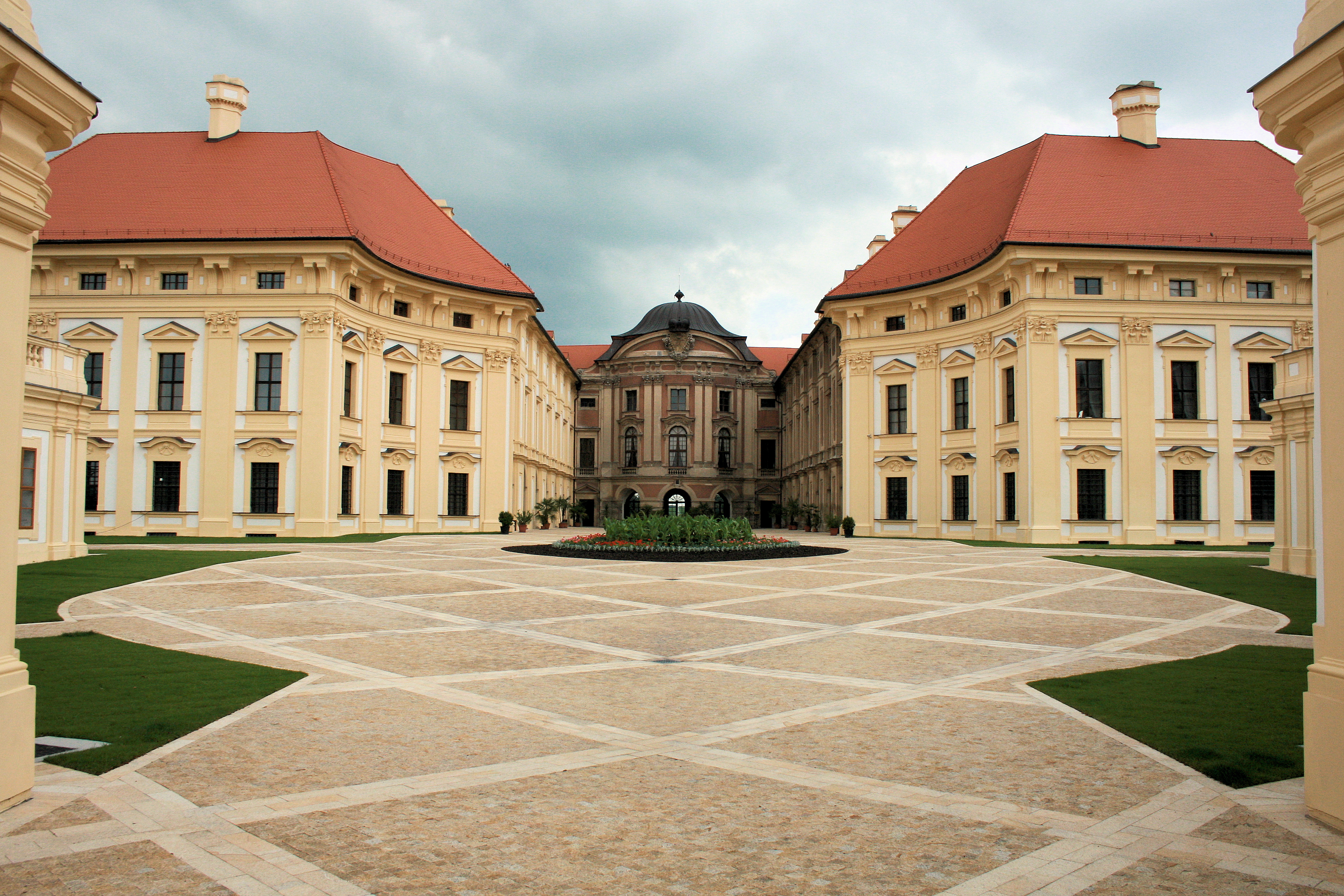
Front view with U-shaped courtyard

Slavkov Castle (also known as Austerlitz Castle; Czech: zámek Slavkov, German: Schloss Austerlitz) is a Baroque palace in Slavkov u Brna in the Czech Republic. The town and the castle are chiefly known for the Battle of Austerlitz.

== History ==
The first castle at the site was erected by the Teutonic Knights in the early 13th century, then the seat of a commandry within their Bohemian bailiwick. In the early 16th century it passed to the Moravian noble house of Kaunitz who had it rebuilt in a Renaissance style.

The present-day palace with 115 rooms was erected from 1696 onwards according to plans designed by the Italian architect Domenico Martinelli. The conversion was finished under Prince Wenzel Anton of Kaunitz-Rietberg more than fifty years later. Wenzel Anton hired the painter Joseph Pichler to apply frescoes in the chapel and the ceremonial hall of the castle. The impressive garden in a French style modelled on the Gardens of Versailles was laid out in 1774. In the oval ceremonial hall (the "Historic Salon"), an armistice was signed between Austria and France after the Battle of Austerlitz on 6 December 1805. There is a small historic museum and a multimedia presentation about the battle.
