= Wenzel Anton, Prince of Kaunitz-Rietberg =

Austrian statesman (1711–1794)

His Serene Highness Wenzel Anton von Kaunitz Prince of Kaunitz-Rietberg
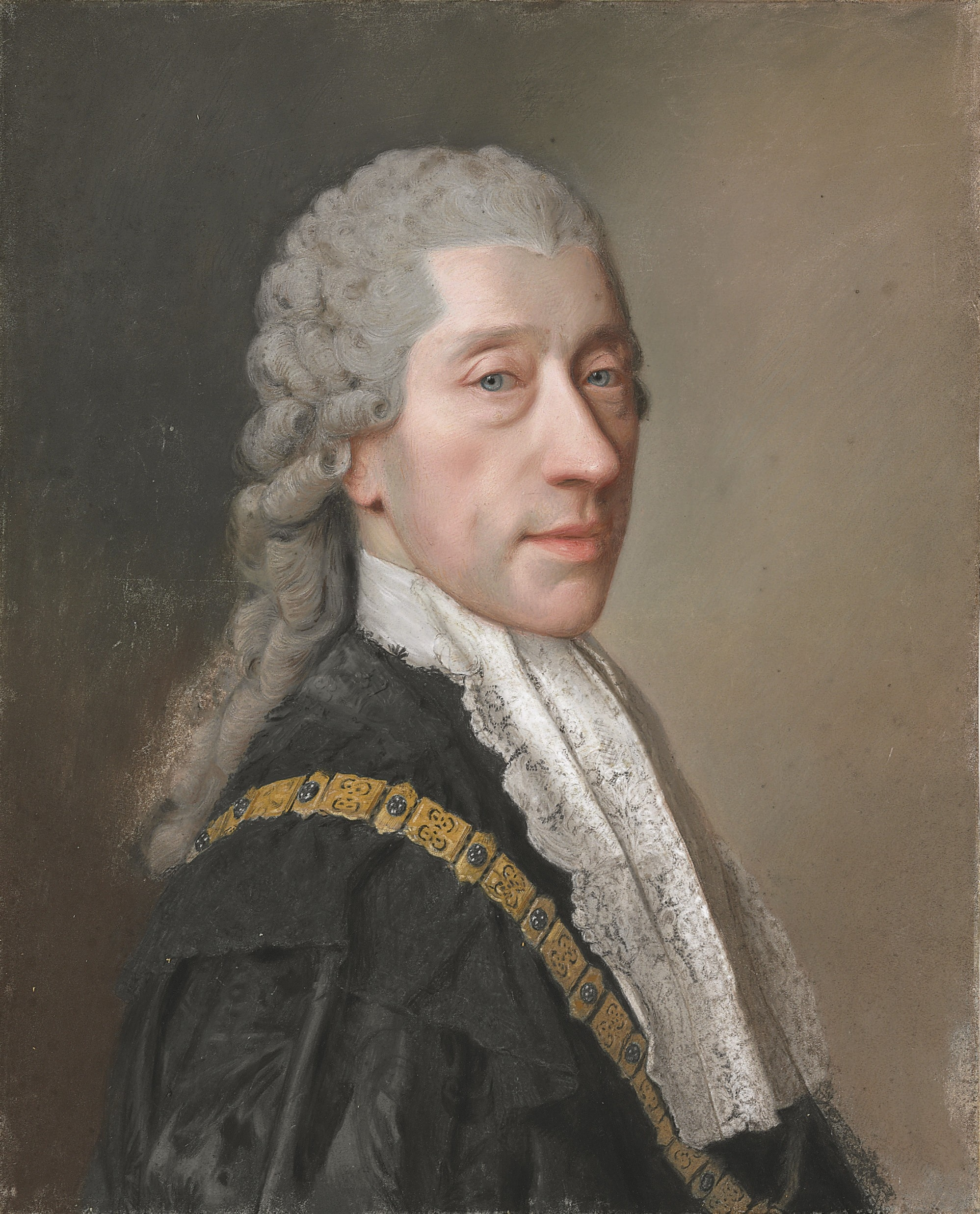
- Portrait by Liotard in 1762, wearing the collar of the Order of the Golden Fleece

State Chancellor of the Habsburg monarchy
- In office 13 May 1753 – 19 August 1792
- Monarchs: Maria Theresa (1753–1780); Joseph II (1780–1790); Leopold II (1790–1792); Francis II (1792)
- Preceded by: Count Anton Corfiz Ulfeldt
- Succeeded by: Philipp, Count of Cobenzl

Personal details
- Born: 2 February 1711 Vienna, Austria, Holy Roman Empire
- Died: 27 June 1794 (aged 83) Vienna, Austria, Holy Roman Empire
- Spouse: Maria Ernestine von Starhemberg (m. 1736)
- Children: 4, including Franz Wenzel
- Parent(s): Maximilian Ulrich von Kaunitz; Maria Ernestine Francisca von Rietberg

Wenzel Anton, Prince of Kaunitz-Rietberg (German: Wenzel Anton Reichsfürst von Kaunitz-Rietberg, Czech: Václav Antonín z Kounic a Rietbergu; 2 February 1711 – 27 June 1794) was an Austrian and Czech diplomat and statesman in the Habsburg monarchy. A proponent of enlightened absolutism, he held the office of State Chancellor for about four decades and was responsible for the foreign policies during the reigns of Maria Theresa, Joseph II, and Leopold II. In 1764, he was elevated to the noble rank of a Prince of the Holy Roman Empire (Reichfürst).

== Family ==
Kaunitz was born in Vienna, Austria, as one of 19 children of Maximilian Ulrich, Count of Kaunitz (1679–1746) and his wife Maria Ernestine Francisca von Rietberg, née Countess of Ostfriesland and Rietberg (1687–1758), an heiress of the House of Cirksena. The Kaunitz family (Czech: Kounicové) belonged to the ancient Bohemian nobility and, like the related Martinic family, derived its lineage from the medieval Vršovci clan in the Kingdom of Bohemia. First mentioned in the 14th century, they originally lived in the Silesian duchy of Troppau, but in 1509, they moved to Slavkov Castle (Schloss Austerlitz) near Brno.

Wenzel Anton's grandfather, Dominik Andreas von Kaunitz (1655–1705), served as a Habsburg Geheimrat and envoy. Elevated to the hereditary rank of Count (Graf) in 1683, his diplomacy contributed to the 1686 League of Augsburg against King Louis XIV of France and the 1697 Treaty of Ryswick that ended the Nine Years' War. Wenzel Anton's father, Count Maximilian Ulrich, was appointed a member of the Aulic Council (Reichshofrat) in 1706; he served as Imperial envoy and as governor (Landeshauptmann) of Moravia from 1720. By his marriage with Marie Ernestine in 1699, he inherited the immediate County of Rietberg in Westphalia.

On 6 May 1736, Wenzel Anton married Countess Maria Ernestine von Starhemberg (1717–1749), a granddaughter of Imperial Chamber president Count Gundaker Thomas von Starhemberg (1663–1745). Four sons were born of this marriage, including Austrian general Count Franz Wenzel von Kaunitz-Rietberg (1742–1825). Wenzel Anton's granddaughter Eleonora (daughter of his eldest son, Ernest) married a successor in the office of State Chancellor, Prince Klemens von Metternich.

== Early life ==
As the second son, it was at first intended that Wenzel Anton should become a clergyman, and at thirteen he held a canonry at the Westphalian Diocese of Münster. With the death of his elder brother, however, he decided on a secular career, and studied law and diplomacy at the universities of Vienna, Leipzig and Leiden. He became a chamberlain of the Habsburg emperor Charles VI, and continued his education for some years by a Grand Tour to Berlin, the Netherlands, Italy, Paris, and England.

Back in Vienna, he was appointed a member of the Imperial Aulic Council in 1735. At the Imperial Diet of Regensburg (Ratisbon) in 1739, he was one of the emperor's commissaries. During the War of the Austrian Succession, in March 1741, he was sent on a diplomatic mission to Florence, Rome, and to the Kingdom of Sardinia. In August 1742, he was appointed ambassador at Turin and reached the support of King Charles Emmanuel III for Maria Theresa.

In October 1744, he was appointed minister plenipotentiary in the Austrian Netherlands, while its governor, Prince Charles of Lorraine, fought in the Silesian Wars, commanding the Austrian army in Bohemia against King Frederick II of Prussia. Upon the December 1744 death of Charles' consort and co-governor, Archduchess Maria Anna, a sister of Maria Theresa, Kaunitz was virtually the head of government.

In 1746, however, he was forced to leave Brussels after it was besieged by French forces under Count Maurice de Saxe. He moved with the government of the Austrian Netherlands, first to Antwerp, then to Aachen. His request to be recalled from his difficult situation was heeded in June 1746. On a journey to Westphalia in September 1746, he laid the foundation stone of the parish church in the village of Kaunitz. Two years later, he represented Maria Theresa at the Congress of Aachen at the close of the War of the Austrian Succession. Extremely displeased with the provisions that deprived Austria of the provinces of Silesia and Glatz and guaranteed them to the warlike King of Prussia, he reluctantly signed the resulting Treaty of Aix-la-Chapelle on 23 October 1748. Both fearing a nascent Prussia, the Austrian and French sides began to make overtures to each other.

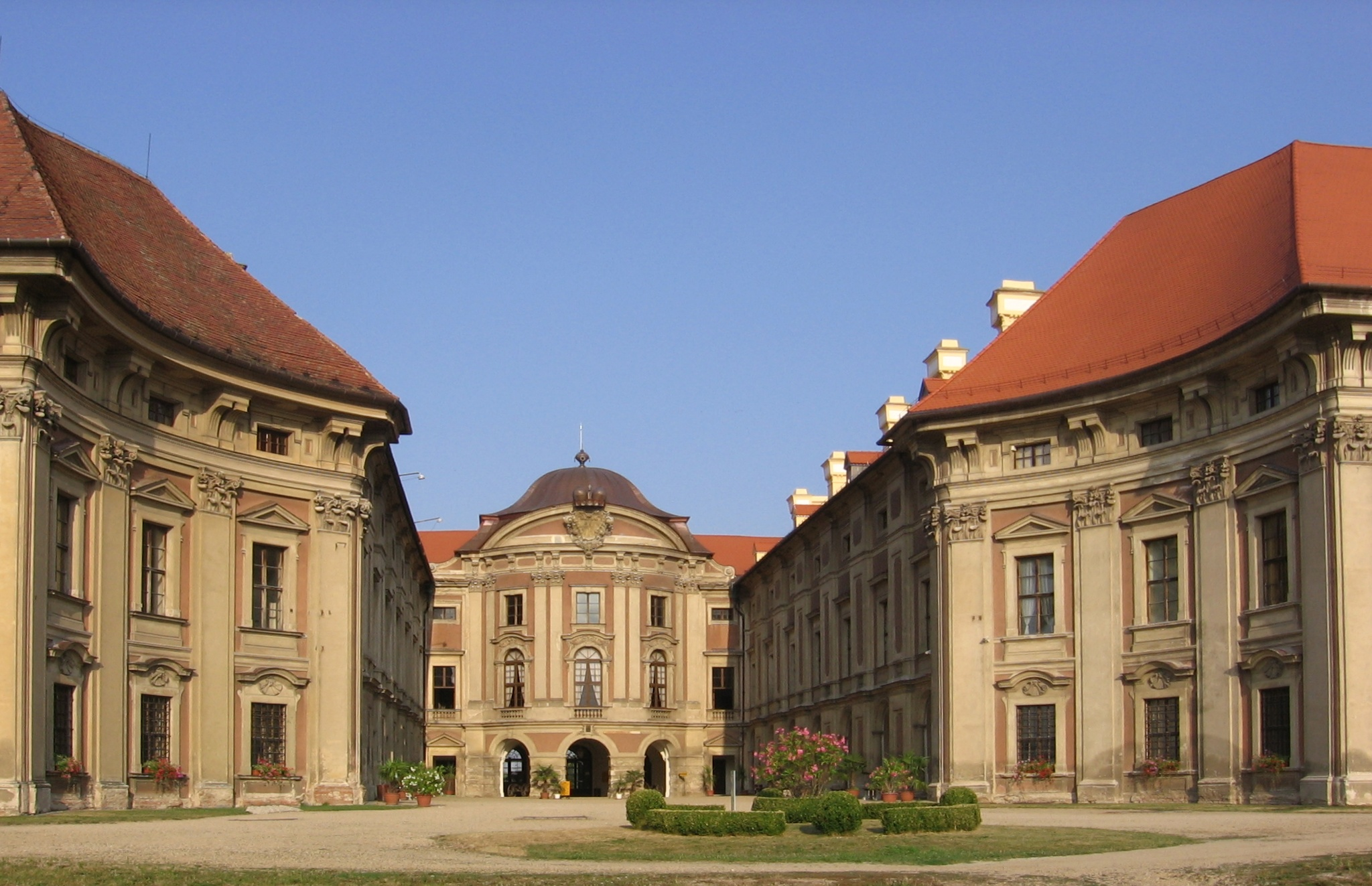
Prince Kaunitz's Slavkov Castle

From 1749, Kaunitz served as a Geheimrat at the court of Maria Theresa. The empress appealed to all her counsellors for advice as to the policy Austria ought to pursue in view of the changed conditions produced by the rise of Prussia. The great majority of them, including her husband Francis Stephen of Lorraine, were of the opinion that the old alliance with the sea powers, England and Holland, should be maintained. Kaunitz had long been a strong opponent of the Anglo-Austrian Alliance, which had existed since 1731, and gave his opinion that Frederick II was now the "most wicked and dangerous enemy of Austria", that it was hopeless to expect the support of Protestant nations against him, and that the only way of recovering Silesia was by an alliance with Russia and France. The empress eagerly accepted views which were already her own, and entrusted the adviser with the execution of his own plans. Thus, Kaunitz was made Imperial ambassador at the French court in Versailles in 1750, where he had extensive contact with the Lumières movement and several Encyclopédistes. Staying in France until 1752, he co-operated in laying the groundwork for the future Bourbon–Habsburg alliance.

== State Chancellor ==
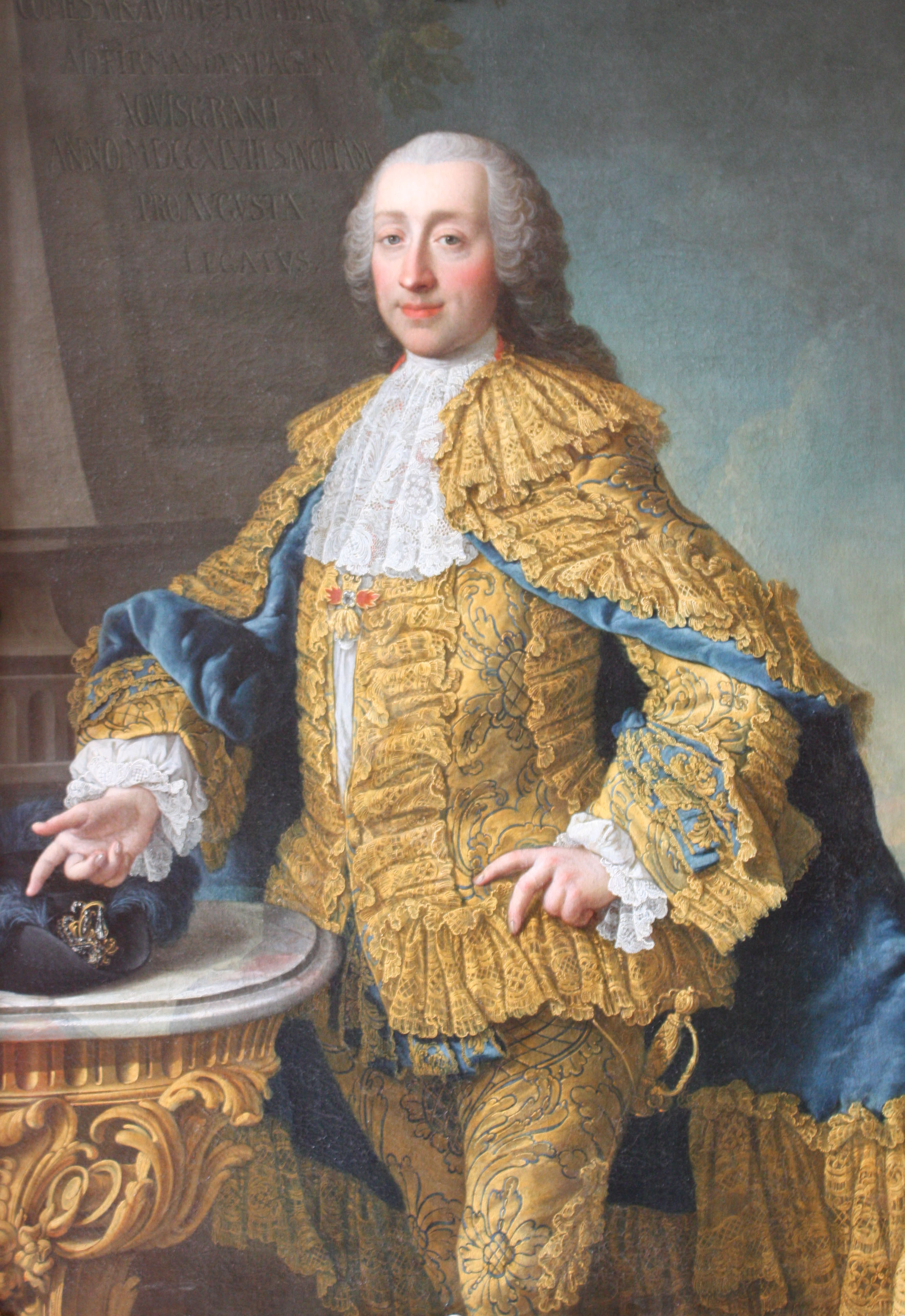
Wenzel Anton von Kaunitz, c. 1750 – c. 1752

Kaunitz's most important and influential office was that of State Chancellor and minister of foreign affairs, which he held from 1753 to 1792 and where he had Empress Maria Theresa's full trust—against the opposition of her husband, Francis Stephen. He had reluctantly accepted his appointment and demanded complete freedom to re-organise the foreign office on Ballhausplatz. Thanks in large part to him, Habsburg Austria established itself as a sovereign great power, entering into the Treaty of Versailles (1756) with her old enemy, the French ancien régime, commonly known as Diplomatic Revolution (renversement des alliances). The new Franco-Austrian Alliance was considered a great feat of diplomacy, and it established Kaunitz as the recognized master of the art.

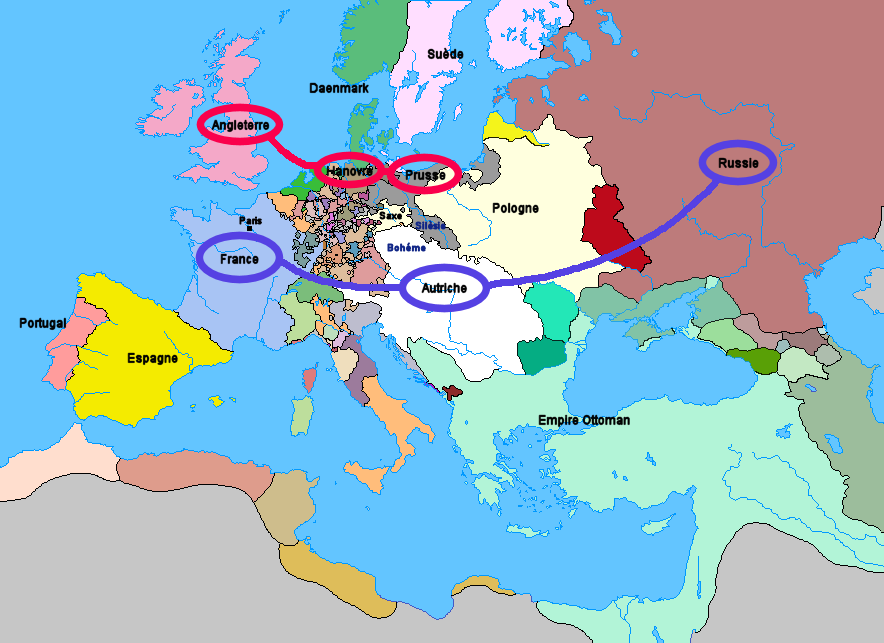
New alliances formed as a result of the Diplomatic Revolution.

=== The Diplomatic Revolution of 1756 ===
Kaunitz was the mastermind of the Diplomatic Revolution of 1756, which involved the dramatic shakeup of traditional military alliances in Europe. Austria went from an ally of Britain to an ally of France and Russia. Prussia became an ally of Britain, along with Hanover. The result was the basic lineup of forces in the Seven Years' War.

=== Seven Years' War ===
Once he was State Chancellor, Kaunitz pursued his policies seeking rapprochement with France. Upon the outbreak of the French and Indian War overseas in 1754, he had the Austrian ambassador in Paris, Prince Georg Adam of Starhemberg, raise the topic of forming a defensive league. King Louis XV finally accepted, after the Anglo-Prussian Treaty of Westminster was signed in 1756. The alliance was expanded in 1757 to include Russia and Sweden.

Thus began the Seven Years' War in Europe, which ultimately failed to bring the lost provinces back to Austria. On 29 August 1756, King Frederick's Prussian Army invaded the Electorate of Saxony in a preemptive strike; they rolled over the Saxon forces and occupied Dresden. While the Austrian allies were not able to reach agreement on joint action, the politico-military situation remained inconclusive. Kaunitz urged for the replacement of the hesitant field marshal Count Leopold Joseph von Daun by Ernst Gideon von Laudon, however, a decisive victory was not achieved.

From about 1760, gradual exhaustion of all forces became obvious, and Kaunitz reacted by depriving his long-time foe Court Chancellor Count Friedrich Wilhelm von Haugwitz of his powers. He replaced the office by founding the Austrian Council of State (Staatsrat) in 1761, overseeing the reorganization of the Austrian Army. Nevertheless, when the new tsar Peter III of Russia left the alliance in 1762, Kaunitz entered into peace negotiations that led to the 1763 Treaty of Hubertusburg. Following the end of war, Kaunitz gained the title of Reichsfürst (Prince of the Holy Roman Empire). The lack of a navy during the war had demonstrated Austria's vulnerability at sea, and he was instrumental in the creation of a small Austrian navy to boost the state's presence in the Mediterranean Sea, laying the foundations for the future Austro-Hungarian Navy.

=== Josephinism ===
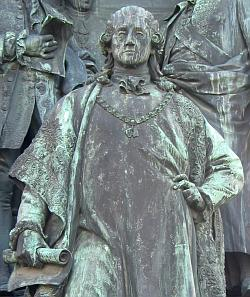
Prince Kaunitz-Rietberg (part of the Maria Theresa Monument in Vienna)

The State Chancellor was a liberal patron of education and art, a notable collector, one of the founders of the Royal Academy in Brussels, and sponsor of Christoph Willibald Gluck and one of Wolfgang Amadeus Mozart’s first and lifelong patrons. He worked towards the goal of subjecting the Catholic Church to the state, most notably against tax exemption and the traditional institution of mortmain ownership of real estates. Kaunitz followed the thoughts of Jansenism and the Age of Enlightenment; among his aims was also the better education of the commoners.

Although Maria Theresa's son and heir, Emperor Joseph II generally shared such ideas, his reforms moved too fast and too thoroughly for Kaunitz. The ongoing disputes between the two men led to several resignation requests by the state chancellor. Kaunitz advocated a reconciliation with the former enemy Prussia; he accompanied Joseph II when he met Frederick II two times in 1769 and 1770. The Prussian king was annoyed by Kaunitz' arrogance and patronising manners, nevertheless the approach realised in the First Partition of Poland in 1772, backed by both Kaunitz and Joseph II against the concerns of Maria Theresa ("good faith is lost for all time").

In 1777, Joseph's hasty military action led to the War of the Bavarian Succession. When the Austrian position became untenable, Kaunitz carried the peace negotiations on his own initiative; by the 1779 Treaty of Teschen, he won the Bavarian Innviertel region for Austria. In Imperial matters, he was able to dominate the Perpetual Diet of Regensburg; in 1780 he was also successful in placing the Habsburg Archduke Maximilian Francis of Austria, Joseph's younger brother, as a coadjutor bishop in the Electorate of Cologne and the Prince-Bishopric of Münster.

Kaunitz worked around the objections of Joseph II to initiate the Austro-Turkish War of 1788–1791. The goal was to humiliate Austria's old enemy, Prussia. However, it misfired: it proved a costly military operation to help Russia, but it did not achieve any anti-Prussian objective. After Joseph II's death, Leopold II became emperor; the war was ended and Kaunitz's power collapsed. The renunciation of Kaunitz' balancing policies led to a serious deterioration of Austria's domestic and international affairs. Meanwhile, Prussia established the Protestant Fürstenbund league, and the Brabant Revolution broke out in the Austrian Netherlands.

== Resignation and death ==
Joseph II's successor, Leopold II, blamed Kaunitz for the failure and decisively restricted his competences. Kaunitz rejected further rapprochement with Prussia against Revolutionary France in view of the weak rule of Frederick's successor, King Frederick William II, an assessment that was proved to be correct in the War of the First Coalition.

Kaunitz finally resigned his office upon the accession of Emperor Francis II in July 1792. He died in 1794 at his city palace in Vienna and was buried in his family vault beneath the Chapel of St. John the Baptist in Slavkov cemetery.

== Ancestry ==
Ancestors of Wenzel Anton, Prince of Kaunitz-Rietberg

16. Baron Ulrich IV. of Kaunitz
8. Count Leopold Wilhelm of Kaunitz
17. Baroness Ludmila Roupovský of Roupov
4. Count Dominik Andreas of Kaunitz
18. Maximilian, Prince of Dietrichstein
9. Countess Marie Eleonore of Dietrichstein
19. Princess Anna Marie of Liechtenstein
2. Count Maximilian Ulrich of Kaunitz
20. Baron Jan Rudolf of Sternberg
10. Count Ulrich Adolf of Sternberg
21. Helena Eustachie Křinecký of Ronov
5. Countess Marie Eleonore Holický of Sternberg
22. Count Joachim Ulrich Slavata of Chlum and Košumberk
11. Countess Anna Lucia Slavata of Chlum and Košumberk
23. Countess Franziska of Meggau
1. Wenzel Anton, Prince of Kaunitz-Rietberg
24. John III of Rietberg
12. Count John IV. of Ostfriesland-Rietberg
25. Countess Sabina Catharina of East Frisia
6. Count Ferdinand Maximilian of Ostfriesland-Rietberg
26. Ernst Friedrich of Salm-Reifferscheidt
13. Countess Anna Catharina of Salm-Reifferscheidt
27. Countess Maria Ursula of Leiningen-Dagsburg-Falkenburg
3. Countess Marie Ernestine of Rietberg
28. Count Johann Arnold of Manderscheidt-Blankenheim
14. Count Salentin Ernst of Manderscheid-Blanckenheim
29. Countess Antonia Elisabeth of Manderscheidt-Blankenheim-Gerolstein
7. Countess Johanetta Franziska of Manderscheid-Blankenheim
30. Count Georg Albrecht I of Erbach
15. Countess Christina Elisabeth of Erbach
31. Countess Elisabeth Dorothea of Hohenlohe-Waldenburg-Schillingsfürst

Source: Franz A. J. Szabo. Kaunitz and Enlightened Absolutism 1753–1780 (Cambridge University Press, 1994) ISBN 9780521466905, ch. 1.

== Notes ==
Preceded by Count Karl Ferdinand von Königsegg-Erps	Minister Plenipotentiary of the Austrian Netherlands; 1744–1746	Succeeded by Count Karl Josef Batthyány
