= Laxenburg =

Laxenburg Laxnbuag
- Municipality
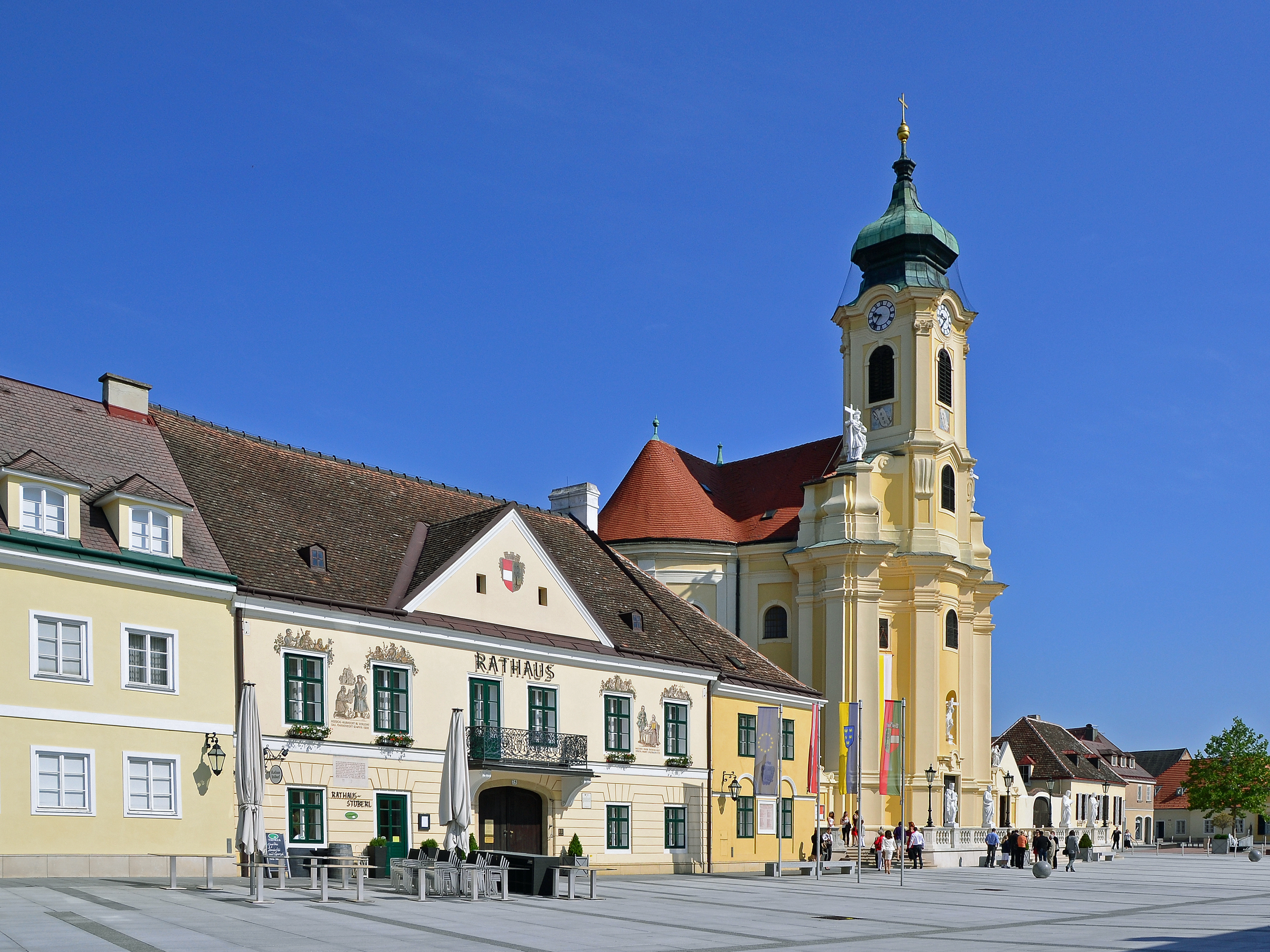
- Main square with parish church and town hall

- Flag Coat of arms

- Location within Austria
- Coordinates: 48°4′N 16°21′E
- Country: Austria
- State: Lower Austria
- District: Mödling

Government
  - Mayor: David Berl (ÖVP)

Area
  - Total: 10.6 km^{2} (4.1 sq mi)
- Elevation: 177 m (581 ft)

Population (2018-01-01)
  - Total: 2,828
  - Density: 267/km^{2} (691/sq mi)
- Time zone: UTC+1 (CET)
  - Summer (DST): UTC+2 (CEST)
- Postal code: 2351, 2361
- Area code: 02236
- Website: www.laxenburg.at

Laxenburg (Central Bavarian: Laxnbuag) is a market town in the district of Mödling, in the Austrian state of Lower Austria. Located about 20 km (12 mi) south of the Austrian capital Vienna, it is chiefly known for the Laxenburg castles, which, beside Schönbrunn, served as the most important summer retreat of the Habsburg monarchs.

== History ==
Laxenburg became a Habsburg possession in 1333. Duke Albert III (1349–1395) had a hunting lodge erected here (today called Altes Schloss) and vested the settlement with market rights. The castle again decayed afterwards, until in the 17th century it was restored at the behest of Emperor Leopold I. Rebuilt in a Baroque style by the master builder Lodovico Burnacini, it became the centre of extended gardens and pleasure grounds.

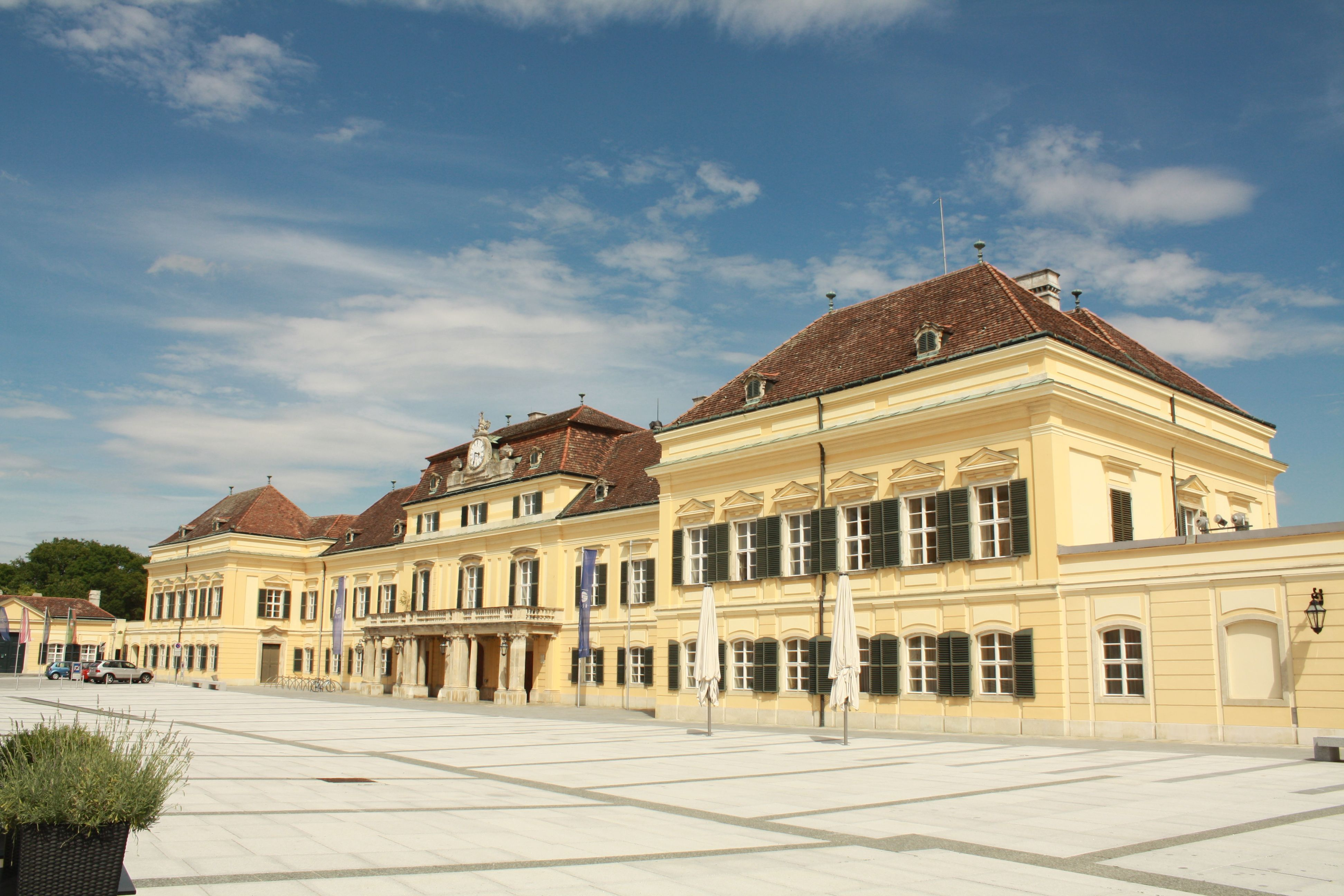
Blauer Hof

From 1710 onwards the Baroque Blauer Hof (Blue Court), also named Neues Schloss (New Castle), was built according to plans designed by Johann Lucas von Hildebrandt as the residence of the Habsburg vice-chancellor Friedrich Karl von Schönborn. Later Empress Maria Theresa acquired the palace and from 1756 onwards had it lavishly rebuilt by her court architect Nicolò Pacassi with a Rococo interior. Laxenburg became the favourite residence of Maria Theresa and her descendants.

The parish church of Laxenburg was erected vis-à-vis between 1693 and 1703 by Carlo Antonio Carlone. Emperor Leopold I himself laid the founding stone. Consecrated in 1699, construction works continued between 1703 and 1724 supervised by the architect Matthias Steinl. It was the first building north of the Alps containing swung facade components (characteristics of the High Baroque architecture).

After 1780, the castle parks were re-arranged as an English landscape garden. It contains several artificial ponds, and, on an island, Franzensburg Castle, named after emperor Francis I of Austria.

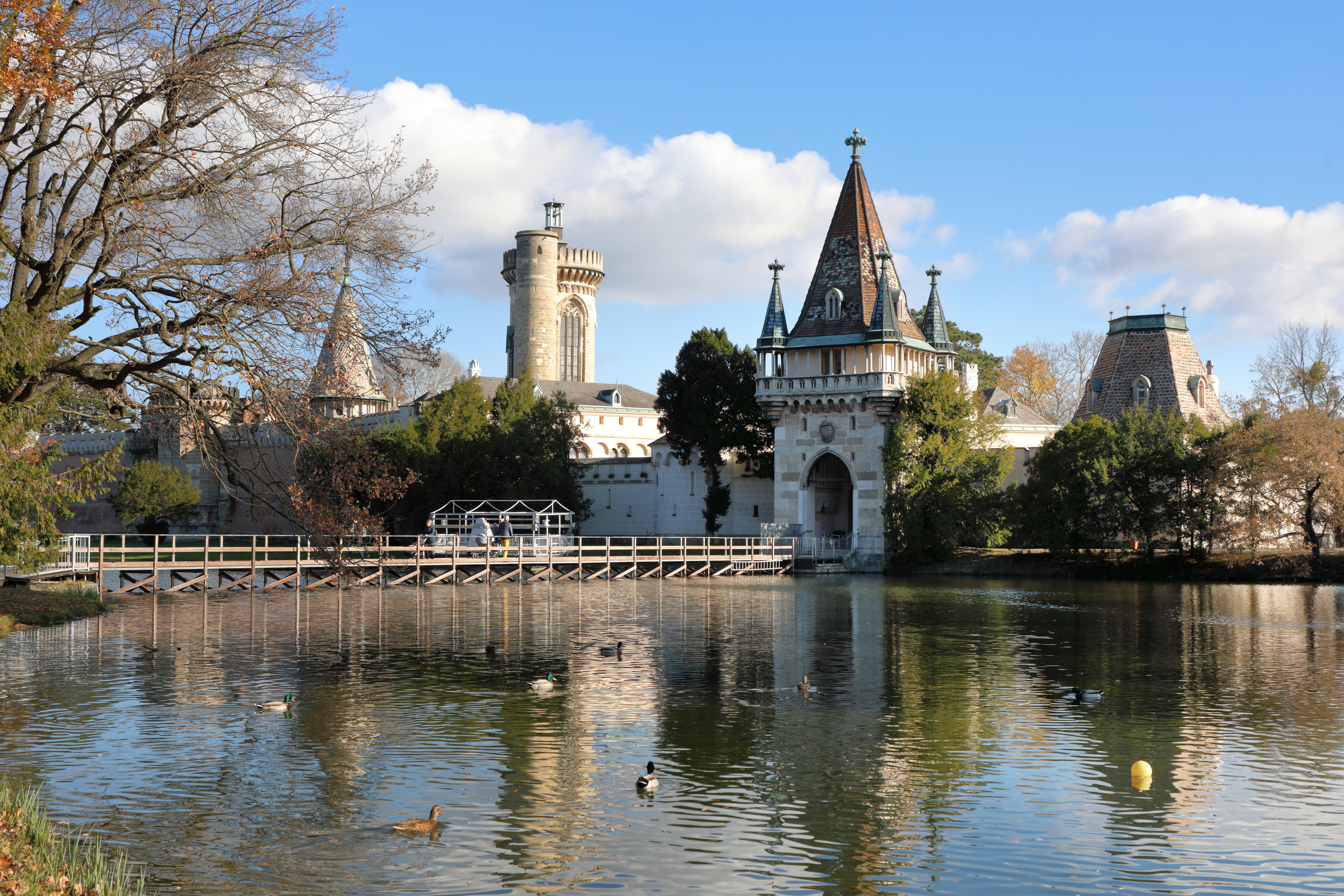
Franzensburg Castle

The current political municipality was established after the 1848 revolutions. In 1854, Emperor Francis Joseph and his consort Elisabeth spent their honeymoon in Laxenburg. Two of their children, Gisela and Crown Prince Rudolf, were born here. After the dissolution of the Austro-Hungarian monarchy in 1919, the city of Vienna took over the war-damaged castle. Since then, the city of Vienna became the property owner of the park area.

After the Austrian Anschluss to Nazi Germany in 1938, the municipality of Laxenburg temporarily was incorporated into the city of Greater Vienna. After World War II, castles and park were seized by Soviet occupation forces. Upon the 1955 Austrian State Treaty, the place became independent again and returned to the state of Lower Austria.

Plans to hold the 1967 World's fair in Laxenburg failed. Since 1973, the International Institute for Applied Systems Analysis (IIASA), a non-governmental research organization with about 200 employees, has been located in the castle. The International Anti-Corruption Academy (IACA) is also headquartered in Laxenburg, since it was established in 2010 at the historic Palais Kaunitz-Wittgenstein. The International Federation for Information Processing (IFIP) and the International Federation of Automatic Control (IFAC) both have their respective secretariat in the city. The Altes Schloss today houses the Filmarchiv Austria.

== Population ==
Historical population
Year	Pop.	±%
1869	1,065	—
1900	1,264	+18.7%
1951	1,168	−7.6%
1971	1,353	+15.8%
1981	1,861	+37.5%
1991	2,605	+40.0%
2001	2,736	+5.0%
2011	2,742	+0.2%

== Politics ==
David Berl from the Austrian People's Party (Österreichische Volkspartei, ÖVP) is Laxenburg's mayor.

Seats in the municipal assembly (Gemeinderat) as of 2015 local elections:

- Austrian People's Party (ÖVP): 16
- Social Democratic Party of Austria (SPÖ): 2
- The Greens: 2
- Freedom Party of Austria (FPÖ): 1

== Notable people ==
- Johann Natterer, (1787-1843), Austrian zoologist and naturalist.
- Archduchess Gisela of Austria, (1856-1932), Archduchess of Austria-Hungary, second child of Franz Joseph I of Austria
- Rudolf, Crown Prince of Austria (1858-1889), only son and third child of Emperor Franz Joseph I of Austria
- Archduchess Elisabeth Marie of Austria (1883–1963), daughter of Rudolf, Crown Prince of Austria
- Eduard Hartmann, (DE Wiki) (1904-1966), Austrian politician; Landeshauptmann of Lower Austria, 1965–1966
- Norbert Werner (??-1991), freelance journalist, killed during the ten-day Slovenian Independence War

== Twin cities ==
- Gödöllő, Hungary
