= Laxenburg castles =

Buildings in Laxenburg, Austria

Coordinates: 48.065°N 16.358°E

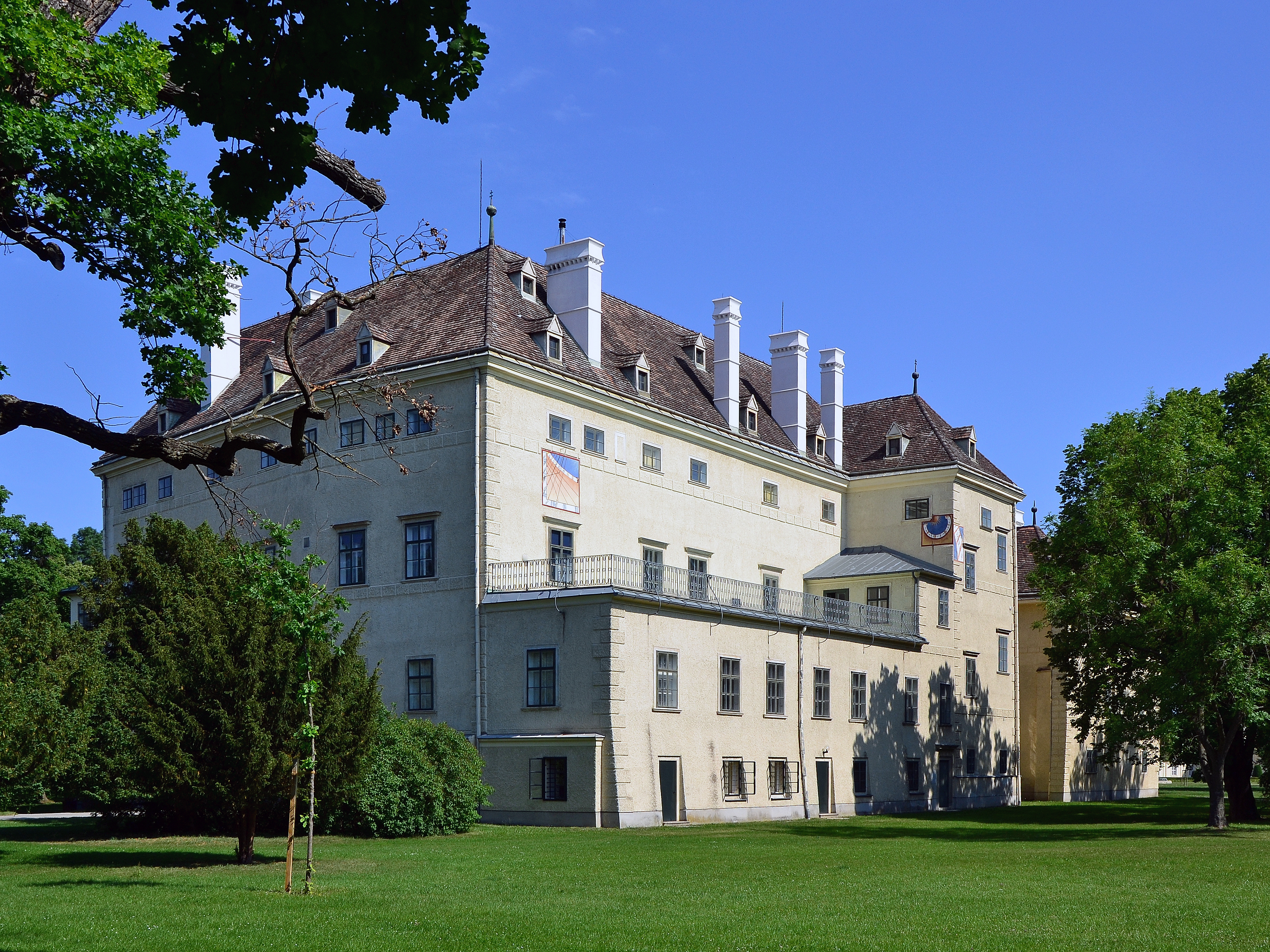
Altes Schloss in Laxenburg

Laxenburg castles are imperial palaces and castles outside Vienna, in the town of Laxenburg owned in equal parts by Vienna and Lower Austria. The castles became a Habsburg possession in 1333 and formerly served as a summer retreat, along with Schönbrunn palace, for the imperial Habsburg dynasty. Blauer Hof Palace was the birthplace of some members of the royal family, including Crown Prince Rudolf. Another castle nearby is named Franzensburg castle.

Today the castles are used for events, conferences, and concerts. The castles also acts as a museum in preserving the various paintings and furnishings contained within.

== History ==
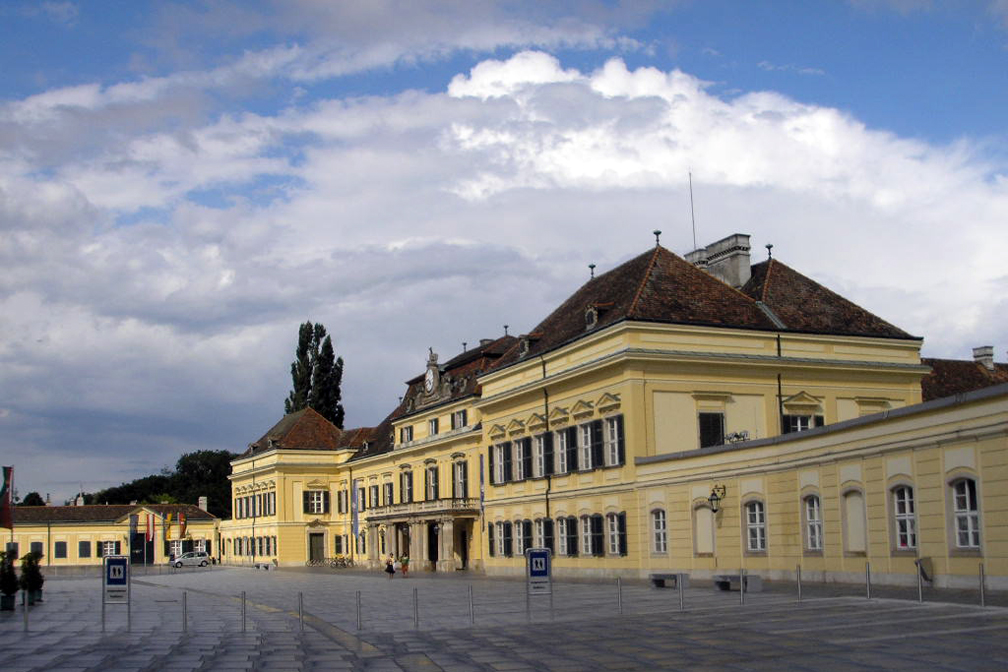
Blauer Hof

Old Laxenburg Castle became a Habsburg possession in 1333 and was extended in the 17th century by Lodovico Burnacini. The Blauer Hof (German for: blue court) or Neues Schloss (German for: new castle) was built around 1745 during the reign of empress Maria Theresa and has a Rococo interior.

The church of Laxenburg, which was the first building north of the Alps containing swung facade components (characteristics of the high baroque), was built between 1693 and 1703 by Carlo Antonio Carlone and continued between 1703 and 1724 by Matthias Steinl.

After 1780, the castle garden was rearranged as an English landscape garden. It contains several artificial ponds, and, on an island, the Franzensburg castle, named after emperor Franz I, can be found.

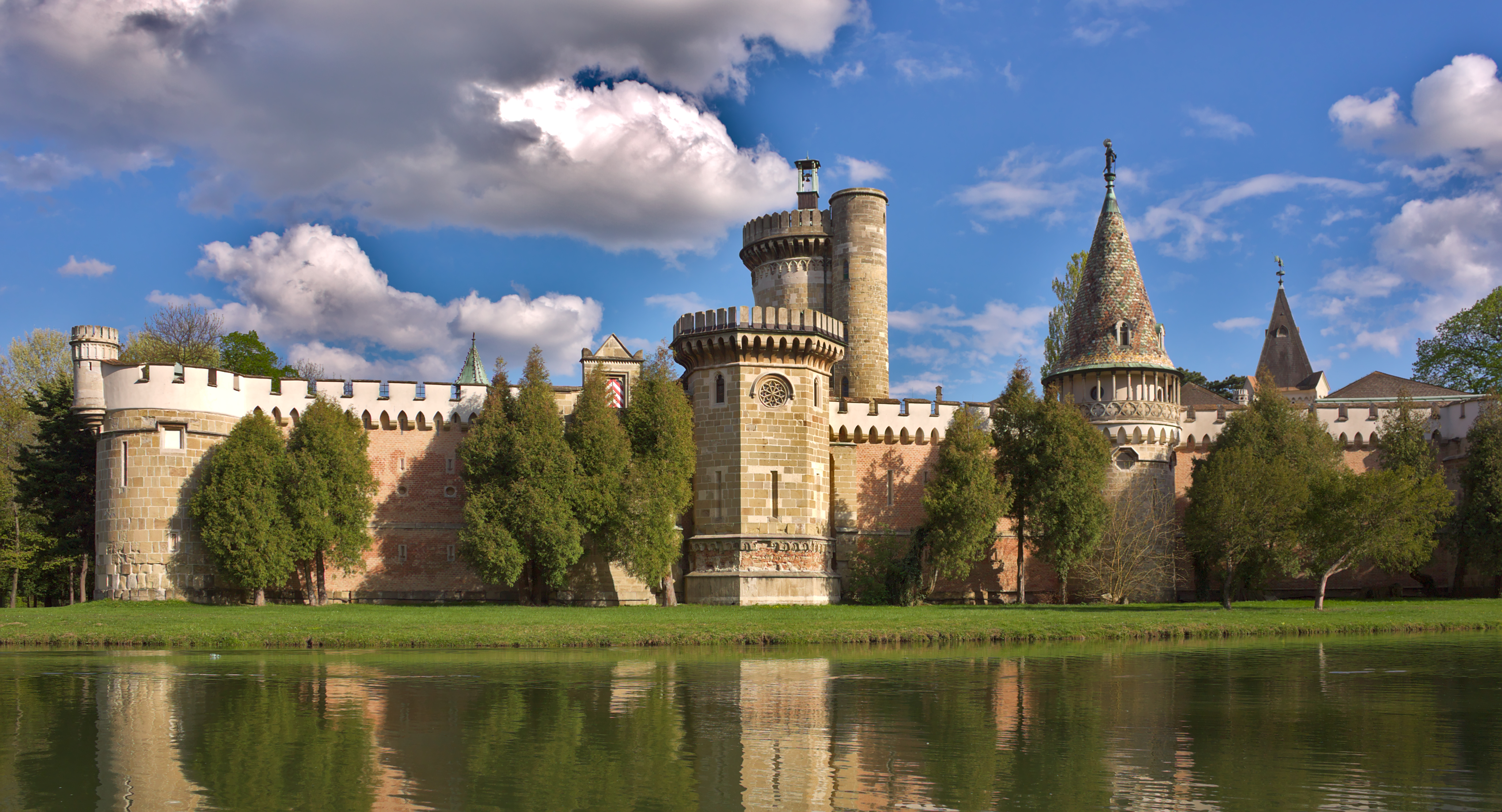
Franzensburg

In 1919, the city of Vienna took over the war-damaged castle and became the property owner of the park area of Laxenburg.

After the Anschluss of Austria in 1938, the municipality of Laxenburg became part of the city Vienna. In 1954, the place became independent again and was returned to Lower Austria. In 1972, Schloss Laxenburg became the home to the International Institute for Applied Systems Analysis, (IIASA), and brought together the best scientists from either side of the iron curtain to study global problems. After the Cold War, the Institute broadened its mandate from the East and West to a truly global focus and, today, it brings together researchers from all over the world to provide science-based insights into critical policy issues in international and national debates on global change.

Several members of the imperial family were born at Laxenburg:

- Archduchess Gisela of Austria (15 July 1856 in Laxenburg, 27 July 1932 in Munich), Archduchess of Austria-Hungary, daughter of Franz Joseph I of Austria and Elisabeth of Bavaria.
- Crown Prince Rudolf (21 August 1858 in Laxenburg, 30 January 1889 in Mayerling) – son of Franz Joseph I and Elisabeth.
- Archduchess Elisabeth Marie of Austria (2 September 1883 in Laxenburg, 16 March 1963 in Vienna), daughter of Crown Prince Rudolf.

Archduke Maximilian married at Laxenburg in 1917.

== Gallery ==
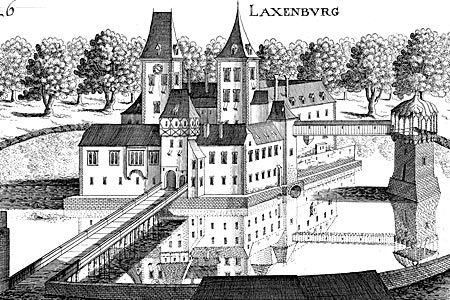
Altes Schloss etching from the 17th century

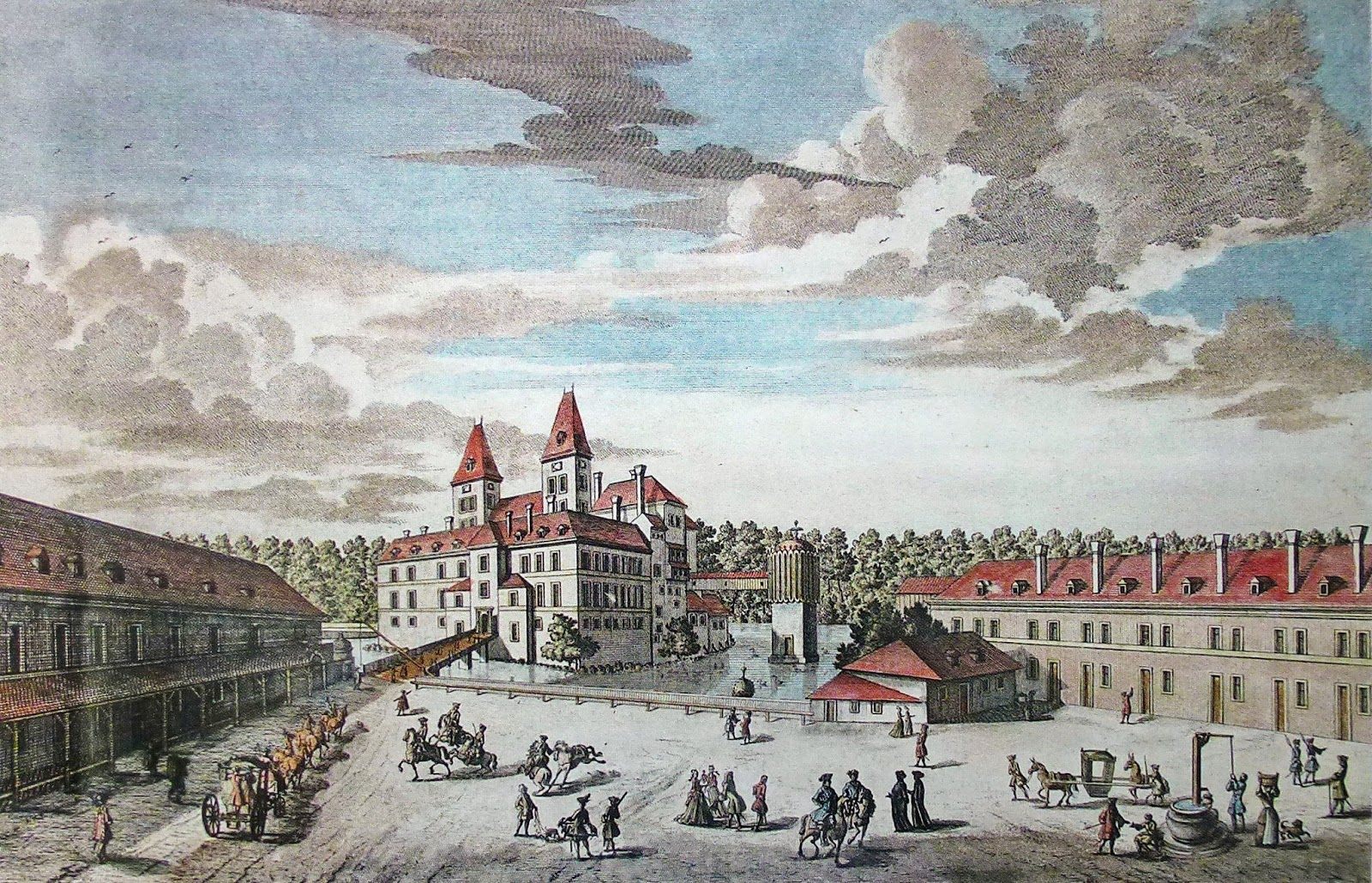
View of the altes Schloss with surrounding service buildings, around 1720, by Salomon Kleiner

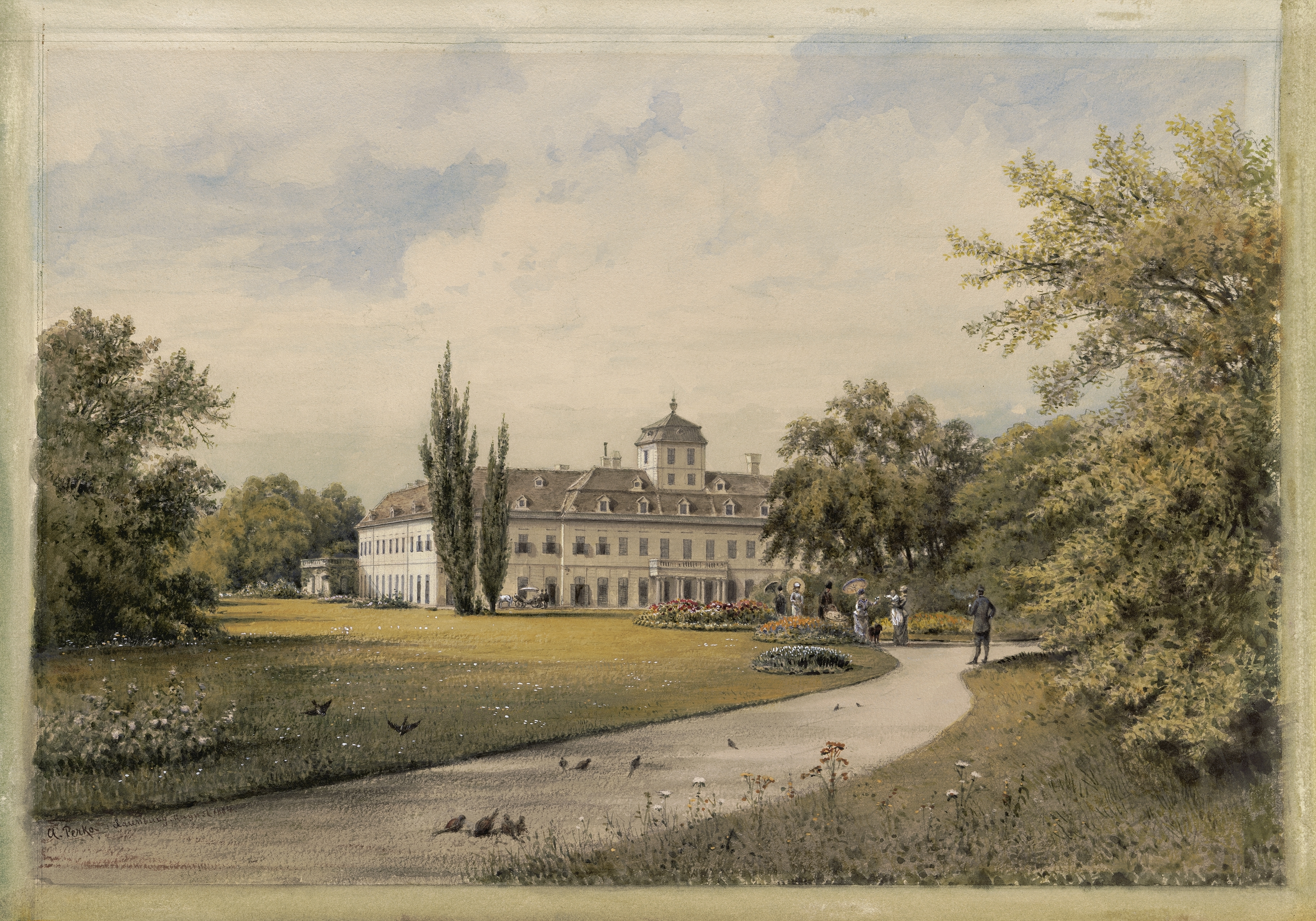
Blauer Hof painting, 1884

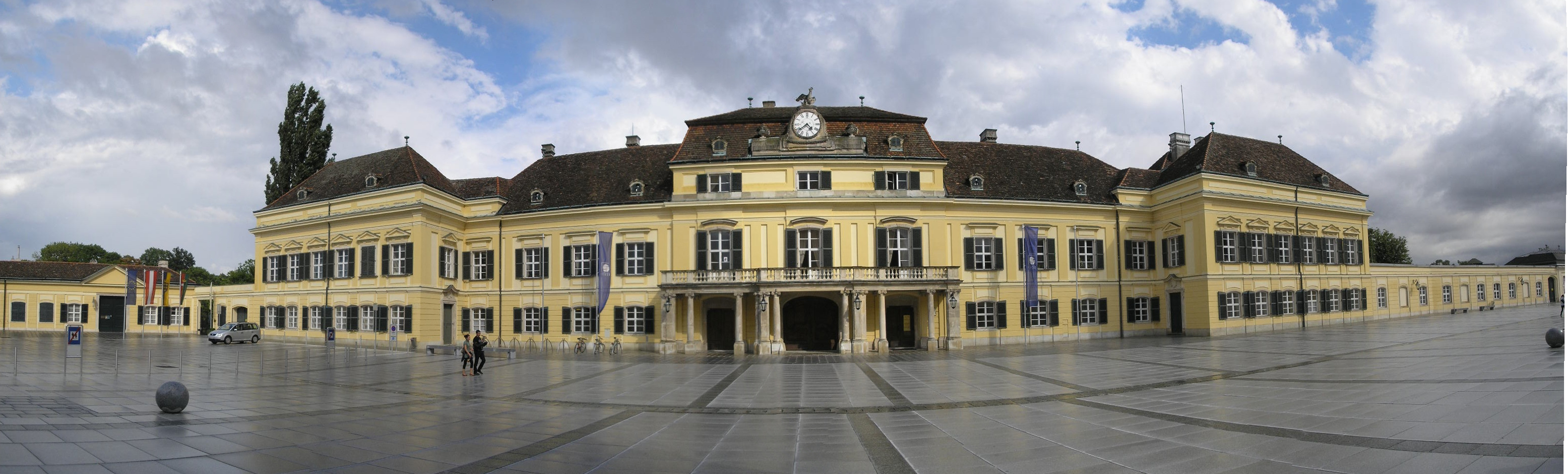
Blauer Hof

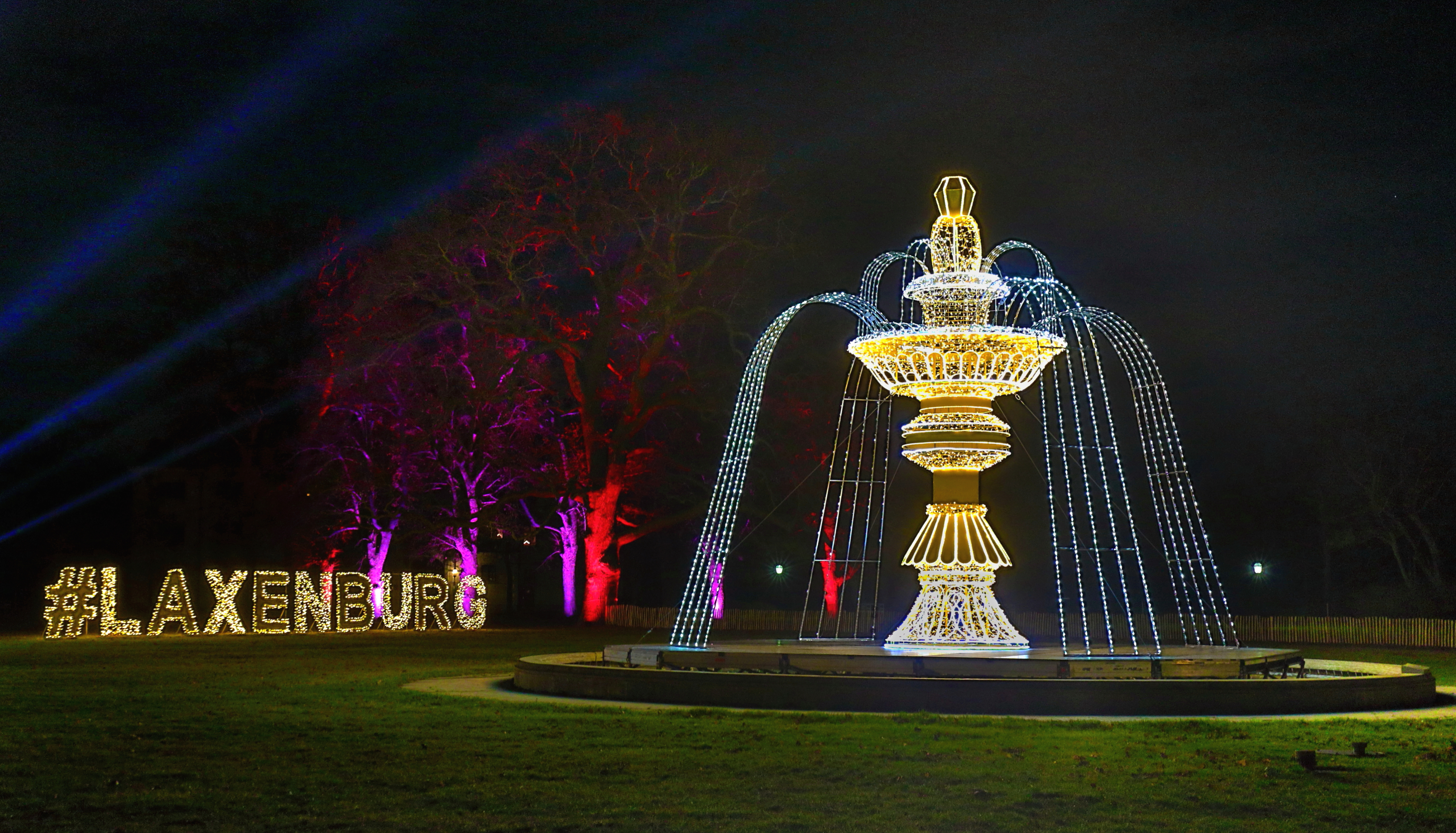
Illumination in the Laxenburg castle park

== See also ==
- List of Baroque residences
