= Bute House =

Official residence of the First Minister of Scotland

- Scottish Gaelic: Taigh Bhòid
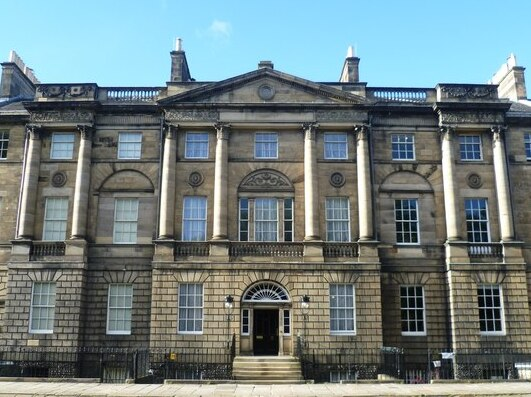
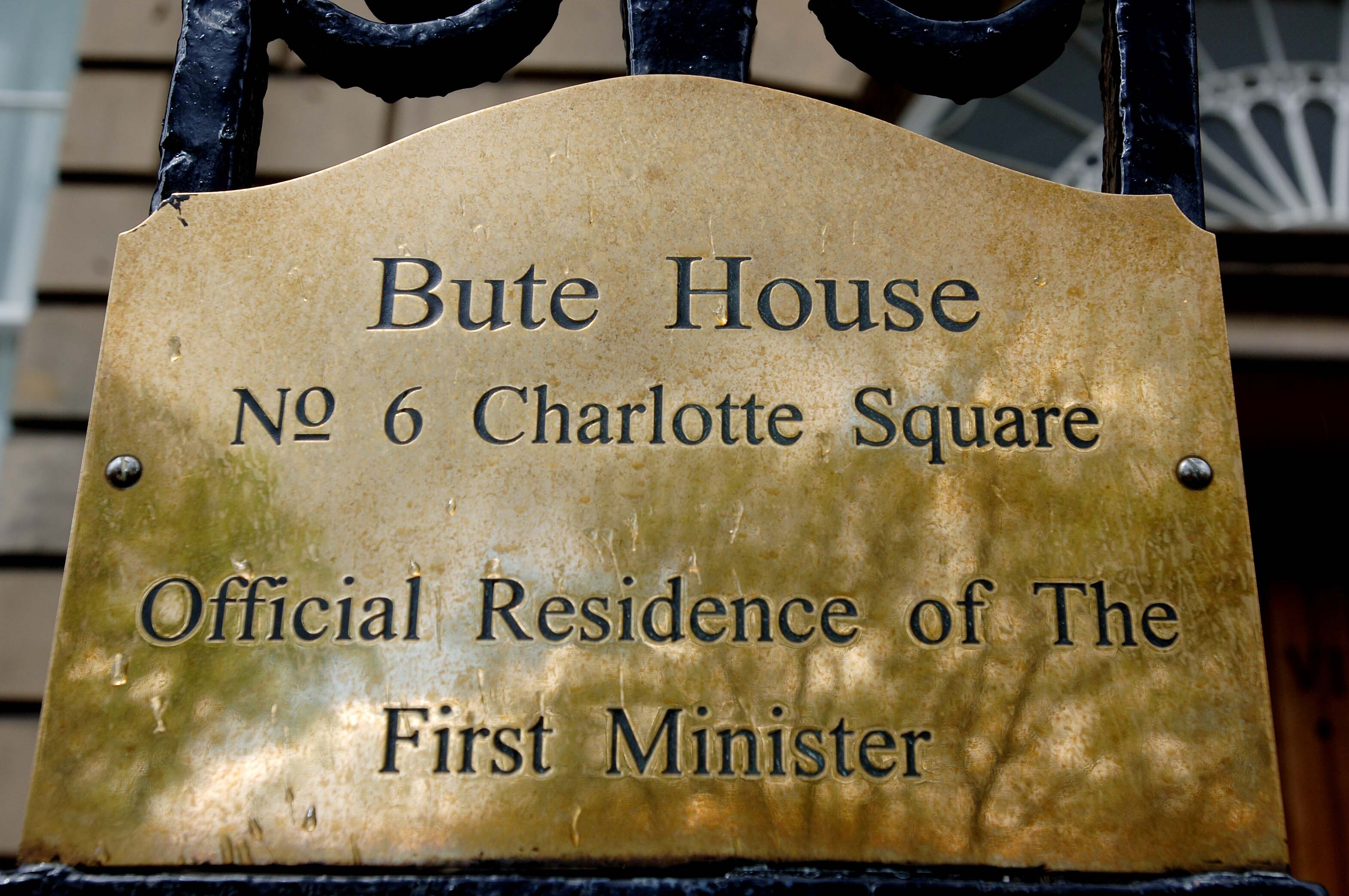
- Top: Charlotte Square elevation of Bute House; Bottom: Plaque at the main entrance to Bute House
- Interactive map of the Bute House area

General information
- Architectural style: Neoclassical
- Location: 6 Charlotte Square, Edinburgh, Scotland
- Coordinates: 55°57′9.360″N 3°12′29.016″W
- Current tenants: First Minister of Scotland, John Swinney
- Named for: The 4th Marquess of Bute
- Construction started: 1793; 233 years ago
- Completed: 1805; 221 years ago
- Owner: National Trust for Scotland (NTS)

Technical details
- Material: Sandstone
- Floor area: 525.65 m^{2} (5,658.0 sq ft)

Design and construction
- Architect: Robert Adam
- Developer: Lord Provost and Edinburgh Town Council

Website
- Official website

Listed Building – Category A
- Official name: 1–11 (inclusive nos) Charlotte Square with railings, lamp standards and boundary wall
- Designated: 3 March 1966
- Reference no.: LB28502

Bute House (Scottish Gaelic: Taigh Bhòid) is the official residence and workplace of the First Minister of Scotland. Located at 6 Charlotte Square in the New Town of Edinburgh, it is the central house on the north side of the square and was designed by Robert Adam. It has served as the official residence of every first minister since Donald Dewar in 1999, and prior to that, the Secretary of State for Scotland who headed the Scotland Office, from the 1970s until 1999. Bute House was conveyed to the National Trust for Scotland by the 6th Marquess of Bute in 1966.

The house is a Category A listed building and is constructed in an 18th century town house Neoclassical style, using sandstone materials. Designed by Robert Adam, Charlotte Square was designed by Adam as a single scheme, and it was part of architect James Craig’s First "New Town plan" which was unveiled in 1767, with Adam being commissioned in 1791 to design unified frontages for Charlotte Square. Together with Charlotte Square as a whole, Bute House has been described as "perhaps the finest architectural achievement of Georgian Edinburgh".

Alongside two other personal offices at the Scottish Parliament Building and St. Andrew's House, Bute House also contains a smaller office used by the first minister when in official residence. As well as serving as the official residence of the first minister, Bute House is frequently used by the First Minister to hold press conferences, media briefings, meetings of the cabinet of the Scottish Government and appointing members to the Scottish Cabinet.

The four-storey house contains the Cabinet Room, where the Scottish Cabinet meets each Tuesday, governmental and ministerial offices, conference, reception, sitting and dining rooms where the first minister works and where Scottish Government ministers, official visitors and guests are received and entertained. The second and third floors contain the private residence of the first minister.

== History ==
=== Early occupants ===
Charlotte Square was designed by Scottish architect Robert Adam. The Lord Provost and Edinburgh Town Council commissioned Adam to draw up plans for the square in 1791 as the culmination of Edinburgh's first New Town. However, Adam died in 1792, and his completed designs had to be realised by others. The north side of the square was built first and is faithful to his intentions. The plot where Bute House now stands was sold in 1792 by public roup (auction) to Orlando Hart, a shoemaker, prominent member of the Town Council and deacon-convener of the trades in Edinburgh, for £290.

The house was occupied by John Innes Crawford, who lived there between 1796 and 1800. He was born in Jamaica on 27 October 1776. In 1781 he inherited the Bellfield estate in St James, Jamaica, from his father, John Crawford. The Bellfield sugar plantation, with its six hundred enslaved workers, generated a net income of £3,000 a year. He later moved to 91 George Street, Edinburgh where he lived between 1801 and 1825. He died on 22 November 1839.

In 1806, Sir John Sinclair, 1st Baronet bought the newly completed house for £2,950. Sinclair was a Whig politician and a writer on finance and agriculture. He was also responsible for the compilation of the First Statistical Account of Scotland. Sinclair sold the house in 1816 to Lieutenant Colonel William Gabriel Davy.

In May 1818, the house was purchased from Davy by Henry Ritchie of Busbie. Ritchie was a Glasgow merchant, a partner in the Thistle Bank, and the owner of landed estates in Lanarkshire and Ayrshire. He sold his Charlotte Square townhouse to Charles Oman, a hotel keeper and vintner, in May 1825. Oman, a native of Caithness, had owned various hotels and coffee houses in Edinburgh over the decades, including the Waterloo Hotel on the city's Waterloo Place, up until his purchase of 6 Charlotte Square. Oman turned his new townhouse into Oman's Hotel, which was to remain for over 20 years. The fixings for the letters of the hotel's name can still be seen today on the exterior wall above the front entrance door of Bute House.

Oman died in August 1826, but the hotel continued to operate under the ownership of his widow, Mrs Grace Oman (née Burns). The exiled Charles X of France stayed at the hotel for a brief time in 1832, during his second period of exile in Edinburgh. Following Mrs Oman's death in 1845, 6 Charlotte Square was sold by her heirs to Alexander Campbell of Cammo, who lived in the house with his family until his death in 1887. Campbell commissioned David Rhind to make various alterations and additions to the house in 1867. The house's next owner was Sir Mitchell Mitchell-Thomson, 1st Baronet, who was to make it his home for the next 30 years. A partner in his family's timber business, and a director of the Bank of Scotland, he also served as the Lord Provost of Edinburgh from 1897 until 1900. In 1889, Mitchell-Thomson employed the architect Thomas Leadbetter to carry out further alterations.

Early occupants of Bute House (1806–1816)
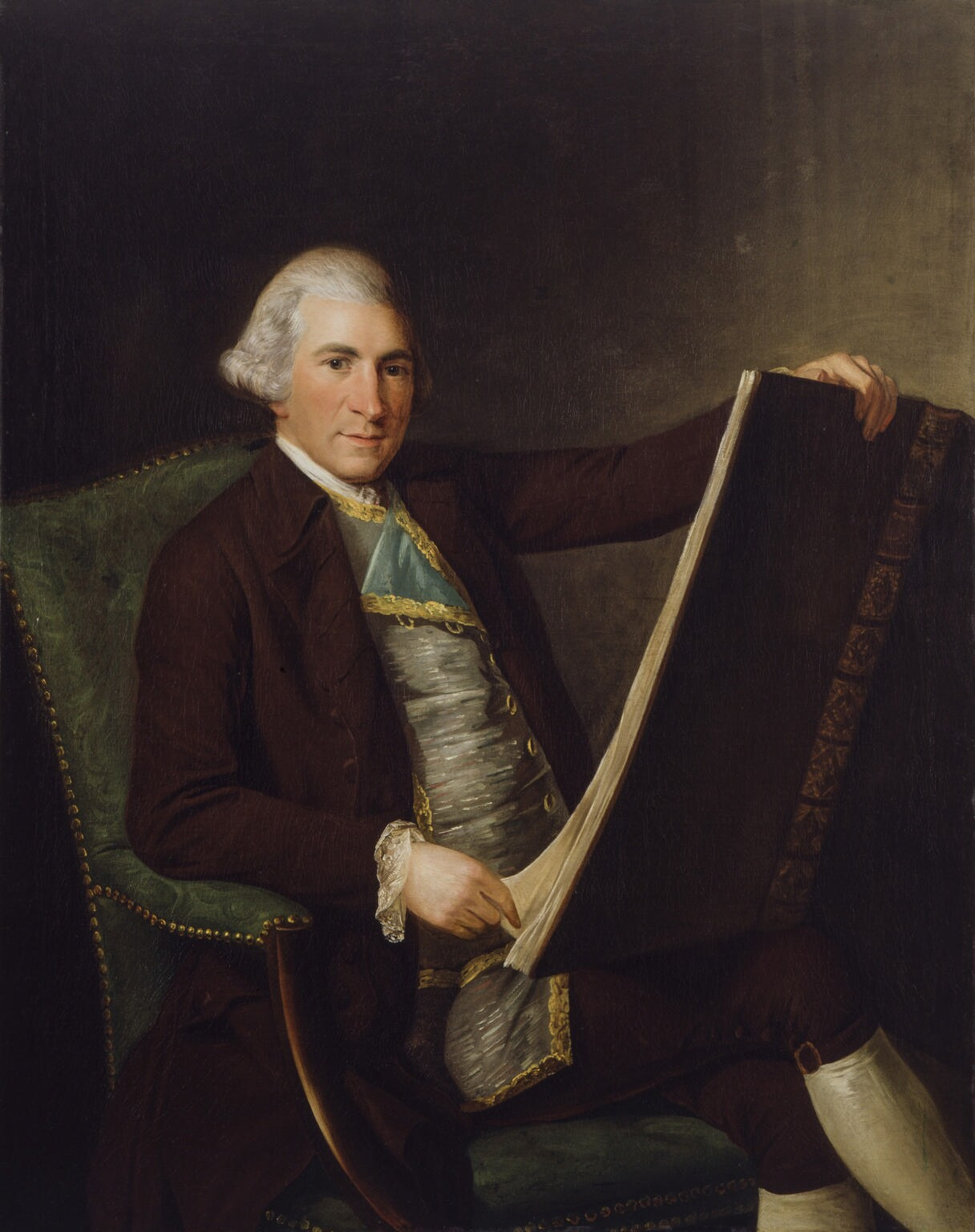
Robert Adam, the architect of Charlotte Square

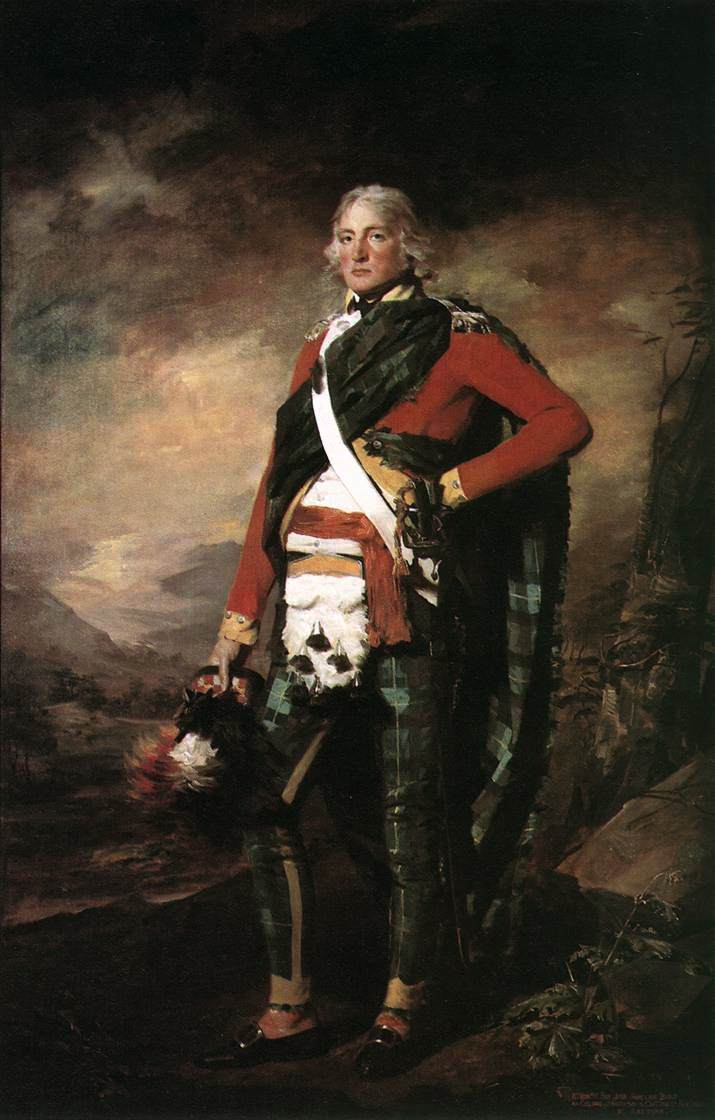
Sir John Sinclair, 1st Baronet

William Gabriel Davy

=== Bute family: 1922–66 ===
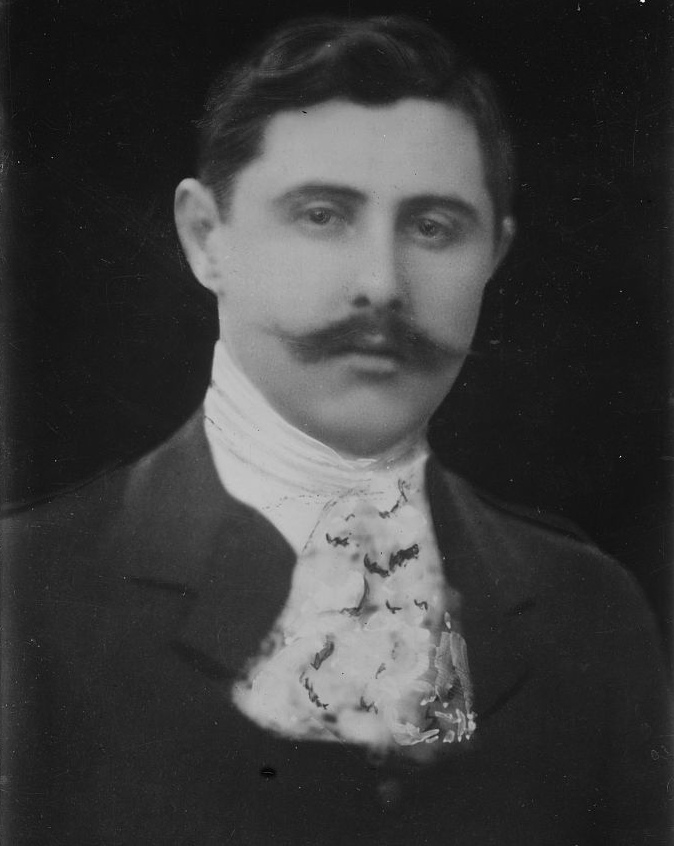
John Crichton-Stuart, 4th Marquess of Bute

The 4th Marquess of Bute had a particular enthusiasm for the amenity value of the Scottish townscape. From the early 1900s onwards, he began to buy up the central houses on the north side of Charlotte Square to restore Adam's original design, which 19th-century intrusions had compromised, including dormer windows and alterations to the proportions of the first-floor windows. Lord Bute acquired the house at No. 5 first, in 1903, and thoroughly restored its interior in an Adam Revival style, furnishing the principal rooms with antique furniture so that it could function as the Butes' townhouse in Edinburgh. He subsequently acquired No. 6 in 1922 and No. 7 in 1927. Lord Bute's enthusiasm for Charlotte Square was given permanent expression when the City of Edinburgh invoked the Town Planning (Scotland) Act 1925 to effect the Edinburgh Town Planning (Charlotte Square) Scheme Order, 1930. The Bute family thereafter moved from the house at No. 5 to the neighbouring property at No. 6, taking many of the contents of No. 5 with them.

Lord Bute's most notable tenant at Bute House was Arthur Sinclair, a distinguished ophthalmic surgeon. Sinclair practised ophthalmic surgery at Bute House for roughly twenty years, and, during his time at Bute House, the iron railings were removed to assist the war effort. Following the death of The 4th Marquess of Bute in 1947, his son, John Crichton-Stuart, 5th Marquess of Bute, inherited the Charlotte Square houses previously owned by his father. The 5th Marquess of Bute moved his family into Bute House in 1949. On his father's death in 1956, the 5th Marquess of Bute's son, John Crichton-Stuart, 6th Marquess of Bute set about negotiations with Inland Revenue, with the final decision being that No.5 Charlotte Square, Bute House and No.7 Charlotte Square were subsequently to be conveyed to the National Trust for Scotland in part payment of taxes.

=== Transfer to the National Trust for Scotland ===
In May 1966, the Treasury accepted Nos. 5, 6 and 7 Charlotte Square in lieu of part payment of death duties on the estate of the 5th Marquess of Bute, who had died in August 1956. The three houses became the property of the National Trust for Scotland, which proposed to lease No. 6 to a new trust which would administer the house as an official residence for the Secretary of State for Scotland, as a building where he could reside when in Edinburgh and where distinguished visitors could be received and entertained. The Bute House Trust was formed in 1966 to bring this idea to fruition. The Trustees raised the £40,000 required for the alteration and redecoration of the house and its furnishings. The interior decoration and colour schemes were the responsibility of Lady Victoria Wemyss and Colin McWilliam. Because funding was tight, the interior refurbishment of Bute House was dependent on a number of loans.

Bute House is not owned by the Scottish Government but remains in the ownership of the National Trust for Scotland, a charitable organisation dedicated to the preservation of historic buildings and sites of natural significance across the country. The property is also legally under the supervision of the Bute House Trustees, a group whose existence was provided for in the original trust deed passing ownership from the Bute family.

=== Official residence ===
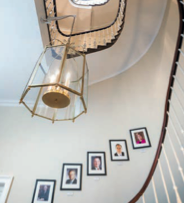
The staircase in Bute House displaying official portraits of First Ministers

From 1970 onwards, after the House was refurbished after its previous owners had given it and two adjoining houses to the National Trust for Scotland, Bute House became the grace-and-favour residence in Edinburgh of the Secretary of State for Scotland, the UK government minister charged with looking after Scotland's interests in Westminster, who remained as a resident in it until devolution in 1999. It is now the setting for the weekly meeting of the Scottish Government's Cabinet, which meets in what used to be the Secretary of State's study. Willie Ross was the first Secretary of State for Scotland to occupy Bute House in May 1966.

The Secretary of State for Scotland ceased the ability to reside in Bute House in 1999 following the establishment of the office of First Minister of Scotland. In 1999, Donald Dewar became the first First Minister of Scotland and the first occupant of Bute House in the office of First Minister. Dewar died while in office in October 2000, and since then, Bute House has been occupied by successive first ministers; Henry McLeish (2000–2001), Jack McConnell (2001–2007), Alex Salmond (2007–2014), Nicola Sturgeon (2014–2023), Humza Yousaf (2023–2024) and John Swinney (2024–present). A portrait of each of the first ministers are currently on display in the main staircase of Bute House.

There is no expectation for the First Minister to take up permanent residence in Bute House. Instead, Bute House is always readily available for the First Minister or their family to reside in for any period of time, whether longterm or an overnight stay while in Edinburgh. Therefore, it is not a statutory requirement of the office of First Minister for an incumbent office holder to "move in" to Bute House upon their appointment.

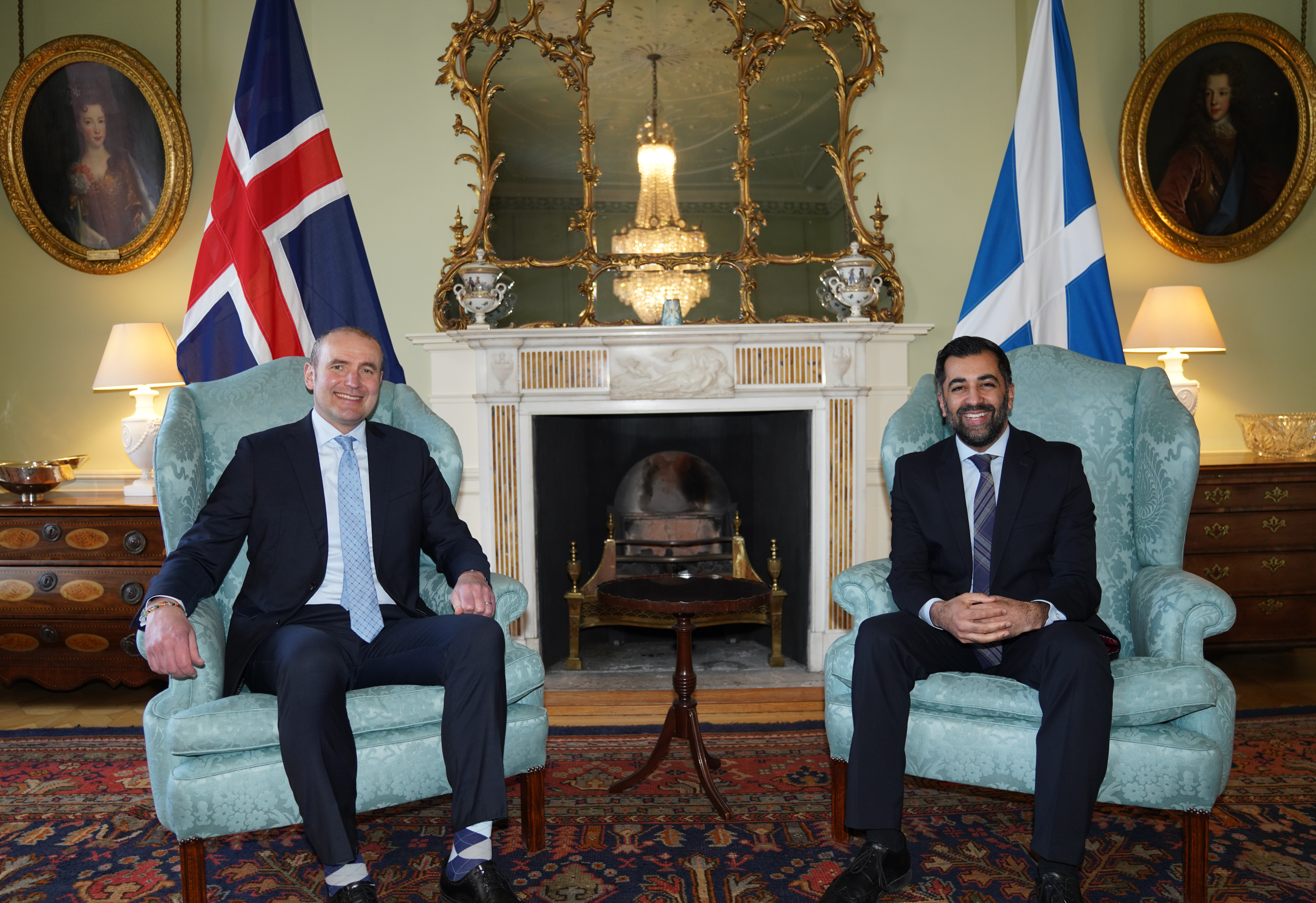
First Minister Yousaf meets with President of Iceland Guðni Th. Jóhannesson at Bute House.

The Public and Private Apartments offer flexible accommodation for events and meetings held by the First Minister or the wider Scottish Cabinet (or other Scottish Government ministers). As of May 2024, no First Minister has had children under the age of eighteen while residing in Bute House as First Minister.

It is the responsibility of the Scottish Government, under the terms of their lease from the National Trust for Scotland, are responsible for the protection of all possessions, assets and items loaned to Bute House against any kind of theft, damage or loss. During the COVID-19 pandemic in Scotland, a member of staff was always present within Bute House for security and protection purposes. During the COVID-19 pandemic and associated lockdowns in Scotland imposed by the Scottish Government, the only people permitted to enter Bute House were Scottish Government ministers, including the First Minister, to conduct essential government business, as well as officially appointed Scottish Government contractors to maintain the building as well as staff from Historic Environment Scotland.

== Suitability and costs ==
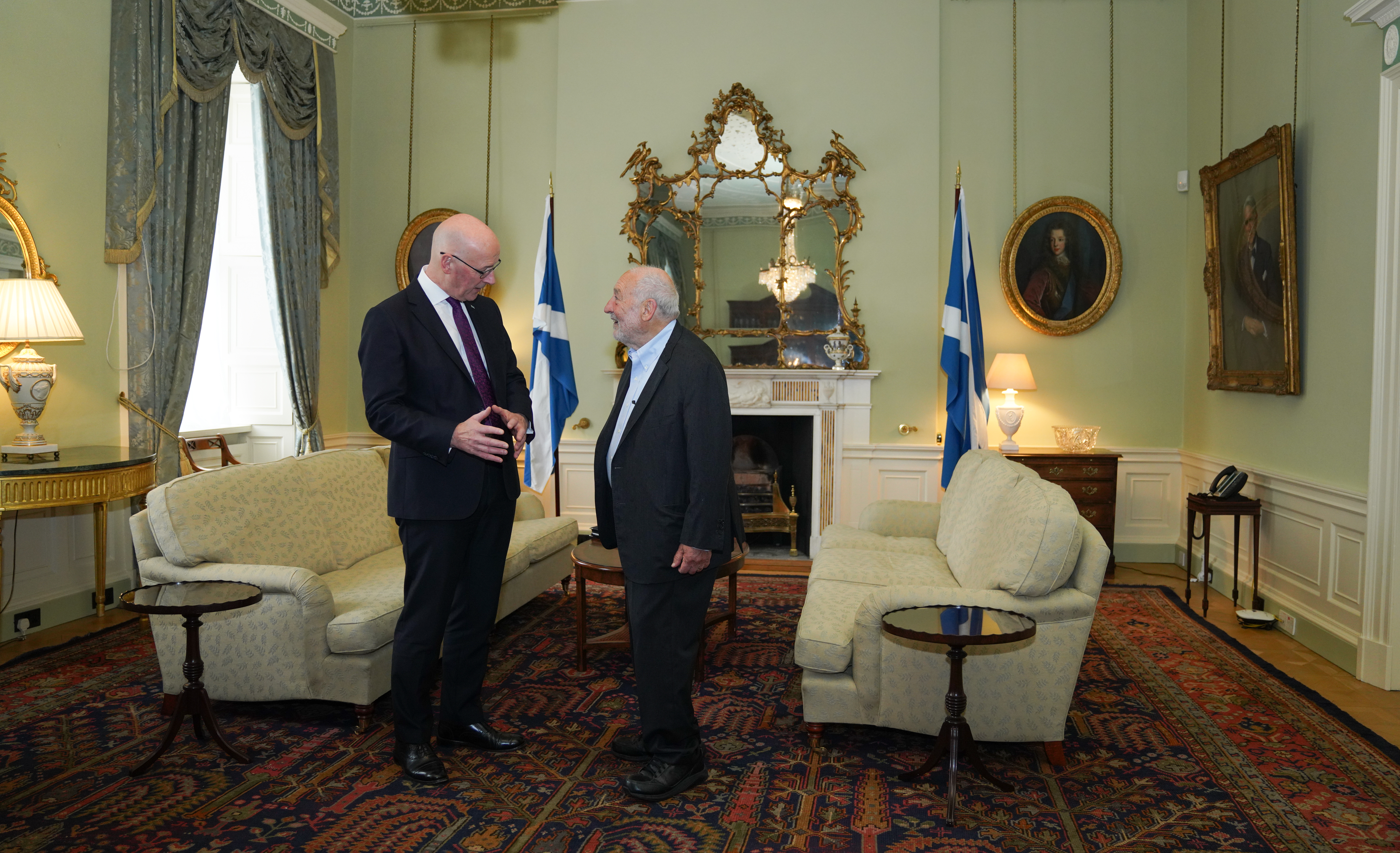
First Minister John Swinney in the Drawing Room of Bute House

As an 18th-century town house with an open single stairwell, questions have been raised about the suitability of Bute House as the official residence and accommodation space for any First Minister who have dependent children under the age of eighteen on the grounds of safety. Unlike flats in Downing Street, the private residence section of Bute House does not have self-contained modern accommodation, and any prospect of a future First Minister with dependent children taking up residence at Bute House during any period raises the limitations of Bute House as an official residence which is ultimately maintained to museum like standard. As a result of Bute House being a Category A listed building, any alterations to the building, including on safety grounds, have to be balanced against the maintenance of the original features and fabric of the building as is. A child safety risk assessment for Bute House was conduced by Mitie surveyors to enable dependent children to live within Bute House with the First Minister if required at any point during their tenure in office.

The operation, running of and maintenance of Bute House is met by the Scottish Government. The First Minister does not pay any rent during their tenure as First Minister for residing at Bute House, and the First Minister is not expected to personally contribute to any repair bills or maintenance costs associated with Bute House. Instead, the First Minister has a "benefit in kind" income tax liability to contribute towards the costs of associated services including heating, lighting, cleaning, repairs, staff and furniture of having Bute House as an official residence. 10% of the First Ministers ministerial salary is multiplied by the total number of days of occupation by the First Minister or their family members which is then divided by 365. The Scottish Government defines the ministerial salary "as the First Minister’s Office holder salary". Days of occupation is defined as the number of days the First Minister or family members have been in overnight residence within Bute House.

== Repairs and restoration ==
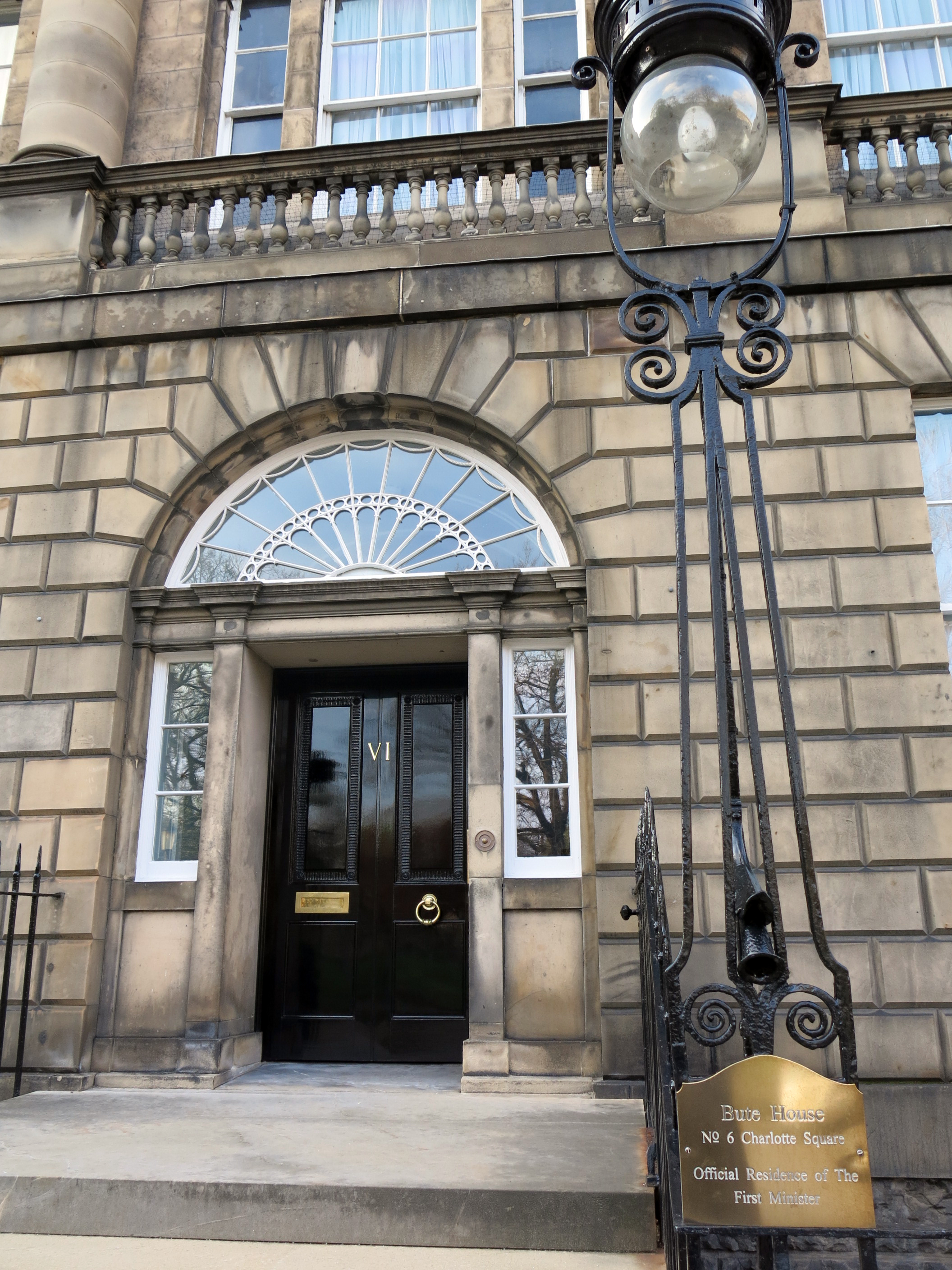
Front entrance and stairs leading to Bute House

A Schedule of Significant Features report conducted by the Adams Napier Partnership in 2017 highlighted various requirements for the retaining of certain elements to Bute House, including stonework, internal decoration and centrepieces. The report concluded that the external fabric should continually be surveyed, maintained and monitored to preserve the significantly important Adams design of the building. Additionally, the report highlighted that any alterations to the interior of the building concerning components of the house's listed building status must be retained in consideration of their "great significance". It also concluded that any future paintwork to the interior of the house should be done following investigation of prior paint schemes.

In 2017, following extensive survey work on the condition of the building undertaken by the building's conservators, Bute House was closed for urgent repairs, with the First Minister having to decant the building until necessary work was completed. The work to Bute House was coordinated by Historic Environment Scotland, with "temporary measures" put in place for the First Minister to reside and for meetings of the Cabinet while the building was being restored. A substantial programme of repair and refurbishment to Bute House commenced on 17 April 2023 and set to last for a total of 20 weeks until approximately 1 September 2023. During this period, alternative accommodation was to be sought for the First Minister.

As part of the leasing agreement with the National Trust for Scotland (NTS), the Scottish Government is obliged to carry out all repairs and maintenance work required to the house for the duration of their lease from the NTS. During a routine specialist technical stonework survey carried out at Bute House in 2021, it was recommended that the house required immediate repairs to a range of external stonework as well as roof repairs. The survey report also identified essential sash and case window and surrounding mastic repair requirements. A fire safety inspection conduced in 2022 made recommendations to further improve fire safety within the building. Following the recommendations, the Scottish Government appointed government commissioned contractors Mitie to conduct a report to advise further on the works required to Bute House following the inspections. Following the additional inspections by a team of Mitie specialists, improvement work were approved by both the First Minister and Deputy First Minister, and was set to begin on 3 April 2023, however, it was requested that this be postponed to 17 April 2023 to allow the transition of First Minister from Nicola Sturgeon to Humza Yousaf to be completed.

During the closure of Bute House during the period of refurbishment, the Scottish Government began to liaise with Police Scotland to find alternative accommodation for the First Minister while in Edinburgh, as the First Minister remained entitled to accommodation while in the capital.

== Rooms and features ==
=== Front door and vestibule ===
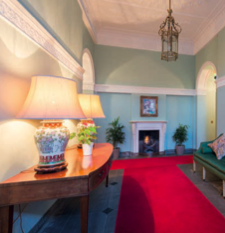
T-plan vestibule in Bute House

Bute House is unusual for an Edinburgh New Town house because it has a central front door. The main entrance door for most New Townhouses would more normally be placed on the same side as the staircase. However, the central door of Bute House was a necessary function of Adam's palace front.

The wide, four-panelled entrance door is made of polished black oak. Between the top sets of panels are the brass Roman numerals "VI". Below the numerals, between the bottom sets of panels, there is a brass letter box on the left-hand side of the door and a brass door knocker on the right-hand side. The door is framed by small side windows and adorned with a semicircular fanlight window. A black ironwork fence runs along the front of the house and up each side of the flight of six steps leading up to the entrance door. The fence rises on either side of the front step to support iron gas lamps.

As the vestibule does not open directly into the stairwell, Balfour Paul sought to ensure that it would not appear dark and forbidding by deciding to greet the visitor with a welcoming central chimneypiece in white marble facing the front door. The plan of the vestibule is T-shaped, with archways leading through from the right-hand and left-hand sides of the fireplace. The vestibule features a rosette ceiling, highly decorative plasterwork in the Adam Revival style, and a floor of polished flagstones in octagons and black squares.

=== Drawing room ===
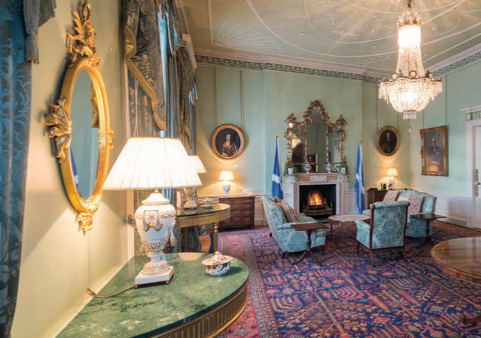
Drawing Room

The room features original elaborate ceiling plasterwork, with the frieze repeating the same festoons found in the ceiling decoration. In 1923, Lord Bute and Balfour Paul complemented this ceiling by introducing new doorcases in the same Adam style, together with an inlaid chimneypiece with a central tablet depicting Venus and Cupid and vases carried by dolphins. The new single-leafed doors replaced 19th-century double doors, which connected this large drawing room at the front of Bute House, to the back drawing-room that is now the cabinet room. The fine gilded rococo mirror is attributed to the London cabinet-maker John Mackie. The 18th-century mirror was originally made for the drawing room of Duff House in Banffshire.

The drawing room in Bute House is commonly used by the First Minister to meet heads of foreign governments, other official guests and dignitaries, and is also used on occasions by the First Minister to hold media press conferences.

=== Cabinet room ===
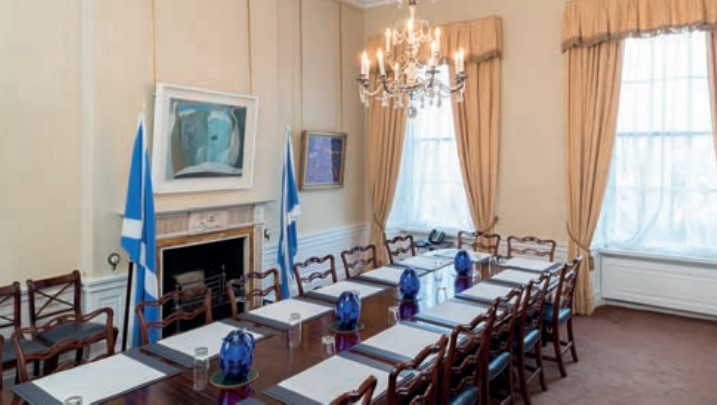
Scottish Government Cabinet Room

When Bute House was first furnished as an official residence in 1970, this room was intended as the Library or private study of the Secretary of State. With the establishment of the Scottish Government in 1999, it became the cabinet room. The room's original appearance, with its robust colour scheme picking up the brown marble of the chimneypiece, is recorded in Harry More Gordon's conversation piece portraying all the successive Secretaries of State for Scotland. This room retains its original cornice, but the chimneypiece and the shaped treatment of the south wall, which replaces the 19th-century double folding doors that led into the front drawing room, were introduced in the 1920s by Lord Bute and Balfour Paul.

Colin McWilliam designed a desk and a bookcase incorporating copies of the portrait medallion of Robert Adam by James Tassie for this room. The modern reproduction Georgian ladder back chairs were intended to complement the existing suite of dining chairs at Bute House. The chandelier was originally in the Butes' dining room on the ground floor.

=== The dining room ===
The dining room in Bute House today is thought to have been the original dining room used in Bute House since its construction. In 1967, the Bute House Trust commissioned the reproduction furniture in this room: the chairs are from Whytock and Reid.

The cornice is thought to be original design from the original construction of the house, however, a shallow recess to allow a sideboard to be included was added at some point by Lord Bute. The gilded curtain boxes features above each of the windows in the drawing room were commissioned by Lord Bute and were modelled on designs produced by Robert Adam for the 3rd Earl of Bute's house located in Luton.

Art work to feature in the drawing room include a painting by Thomas Faed titled Sir Walter Scott and his Friends. The Millennium Silverware Collection, pieces of silverware art from fifteen of Scotland's top silversmiths which were created to mark the reopening of the Scottish Parliament also feature in the drawing room. The silverware collection is on permanent loan to Bute House from the Scottish Goldsmiths Trust.

== Furnishings and decoration ==
=== Furniture ===
All pieces of furniture within Bute House are the possession of both the Scottish Government and the National Trust for Scotland. When a new First Minister is appointed, the furnishings and decor of Bute House does not change, however, there may be alterations to the layout of furnishings within rooms at the request of the First Minister if asked to do so. The private resident apartments within the house are serviced, and all bed linen and towels are laundered by the Scottish Government within the service arrangements.

Upon the appointment of Humza Yousaf as First Minister in March 2023, he requested "minor adjustments" to the layout and furnishing locations within Bute House. Any future alterations of the layout of the house were to be approved by the First Minister.

=== Artwork ===
==== Cabinet Room ====
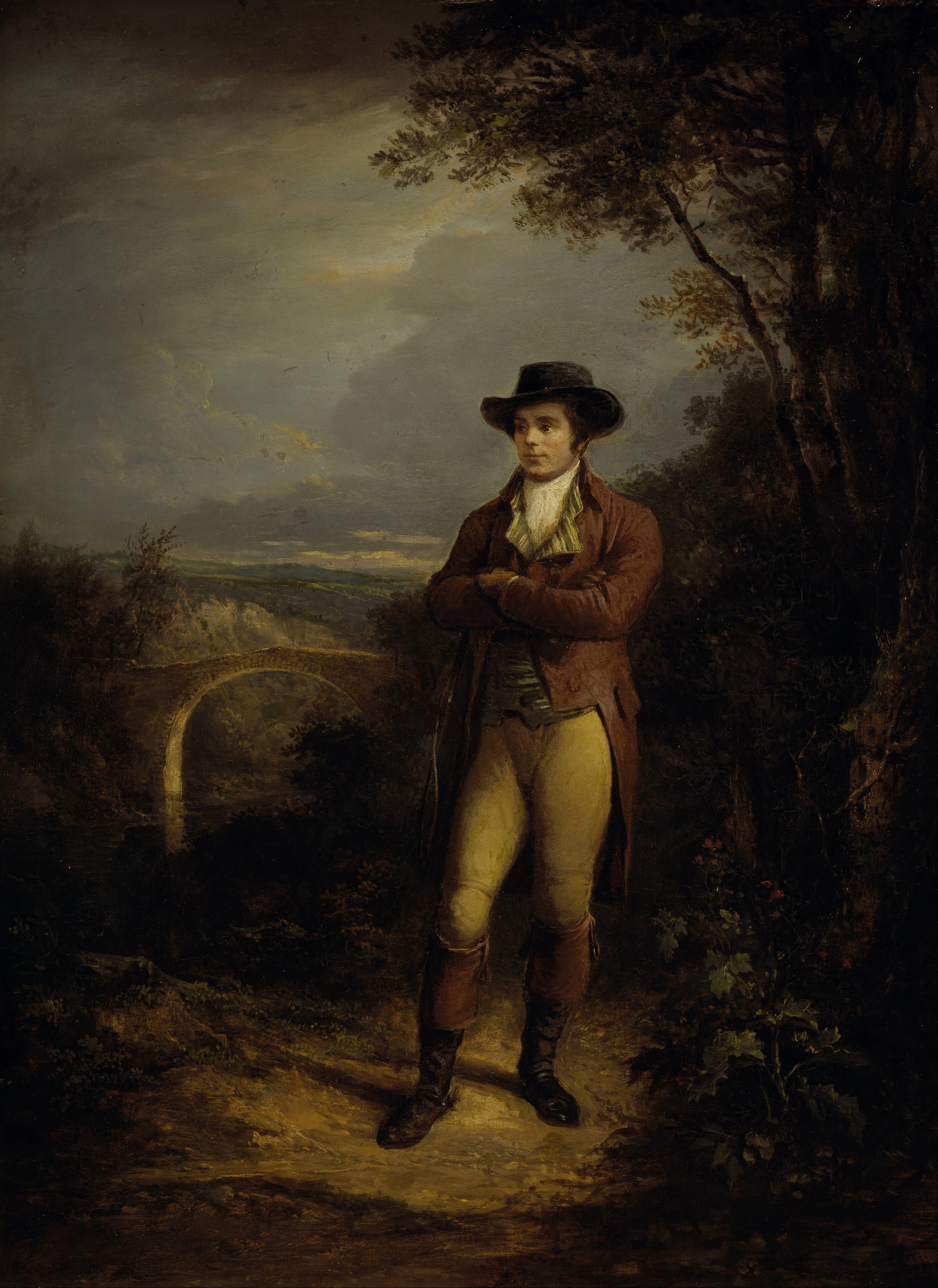
Alexander Nasmyth's portrait of Robert Burns features in the drawing room.

During the premiership of Nicola Sturgeon (2014–2023), the Cabinet Room of Bute House featured artwork by "women artists", perhaps a symbolism of Sturgeon being the first women to hold the office of first minister. Glacier Chasm by Wilhelmina Barns-Graham was loaned to Bute House by the National Trust for Scotland, and is one of a series of painting created by Barns-Graham in 1951 after spending time in Switzerland, where she claimed to be inspired by walking in the Grindelwald glaciers. Wilhelmina Barns-Graham (1912–2004) was born and raised in St Andrews, and studied at the Edinburgh College of Art. Playa de San Cristóbal by Anne Redpath, again loaned to the house by the National Trust for Scotland, features a dramatic seaside composition which was painted by Redpath after she visited Tenerife in 1959. Born in Galashiels, Anne Redpath (1895–1965) also studied at the Edinburgh College of Art during the First World War. Following her studies at the college, she primarily became focused on her family life and her children whilst residing in France.

==== Dining Room ====
Artwork featured within the dining room at Bute House follow the theme of music and conviviality of Scotland. Niel and Donald Gow by David Allan is on loan to the house by the National Galleries of Scotland, and features Neil Gow (1727–1807), a fiddler who was considered to be one Scotland's most celebrated musicians. The picture features Gow's brother, Donald. A portrait of Marjory Kennedy-Fraser by John Duncan, also on load from the National Galleries of Scotland, depicts Kennedy–Fraser on the Isle of Eriskay, which she visited with John Duncan in 1905.

==== Drawing Room ====
Within the Drawing Room at Bute House, the artwork featured follows the theme of prominent and influential Scots. A portrait of Robert Burns by Alexander Nasmyth is on load to Bute House from the National Galleries of Scotland. Burns is recognised as the national poet of Scotland, spending considerable amounts of time in Edinburgh in from 1786 until 1788. His poem, "Bonnie Jean", (1793) was written for Jean McMurdo of Drumlanrig, who would later reside in Bute House. The artist of the portrait, Alexander Nasmyth (1758–1840), was born in Edinburgh, and became an influential artist during his time. He and Robert Burns became close associates and friends, with Nasmyth creating several portraits of Burns during his lifetime.

Additionally, a portrait of politician Winnie Ewing by Norman Edgar features within the drawing room. Ewing stood as a parliamentary candidate in 1967 for the Scottish National Party in which she won, subsequently becoming the first politician from the party to represent Scotland in parliament. Ewing later represented Scotland in the European Parliament and was elected to the reconvened Scottish Parliament in 1999. The portrait by Edgar emphasises forthright personality of Ewing, which would later become a key characteristic of her personality, making her a prominent and respected figure throughout her political career.

== Security and incidents ==
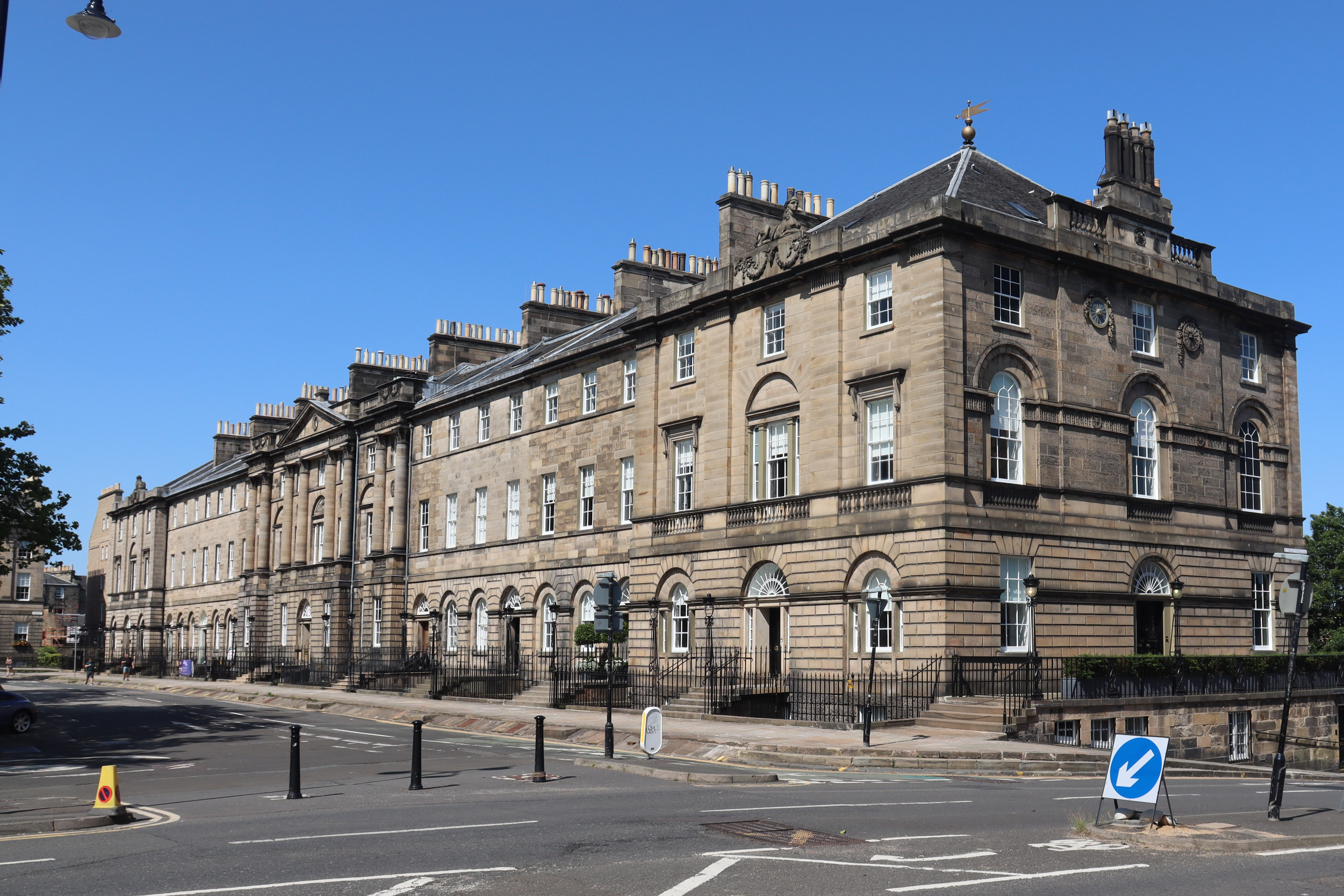
Security bollards at the junction of Charlotte Square

In 2002, a drunken woman was able to enter Bute House and attend a private function that was taking place within Bute House. During this incident, neither then-First Minister Jack McConnell nor his wife were in residence at Bute House.

In 2004, it was reported, incorrectly, that a bomb had been found close to Bute House while McConnell was serving as First Minister. After an investigation, it was concluded that the suspect was indeed carrying nothing that could be deemed harmful and was later sectioned under the Mental Health Act.

In 2016, a man walked up to the front door of Bute House and began to shout abuse, asking if Nicola Sturgeon was inside the building. Sturgeon was not in residence at Bute House during this incident, but the man was later found guilty of two charges of breach of the peace.

As a result of further restrictions to tackle rising COVID-19 cases in Scotland, 70 protesters gathered outside Bute House to protest against further restrictions in Scotland, claiming that it was a "conspiracy theory". Four men were later arrested for breaking the coronavirus lockdown restrictions that were currently in place within the Edinburgh area at the time of the protest.
