= Noël Annesley =

British art expert and auctioneer

Arthur Noël Grove Annesley (born 28 December 1941) is a British auctioneer, art expert, and the honorary chairman of Christie's.

== Early life ==
Noël Annesley was born on 28 December 1941, the son of E. P. Grove Annesley, OBE and Ruth, daughter of A. Norman Rushforth. He was educated at Harrow School, and earned an MA in classics from Worcester College, Oxford.

== Career ==
In 1964, Annesley began work for Christie's, and has specialised in old master drawings. With over fifty years of service, Annesley is one of the longest serving directors and chairmen of Christie's, having hired and trained specialists such as Paul Raison and Anthony Crichton-Stuart; he contributed the entry on Christie's to the Grove Dictionary of Art.

He co-founded the department of prints and drawings with Brian Sewell, and was Sewell's last assistant before he left to become an art critic. He ran his first auction in 1967. Annesley was deputy chairman of Christie's International plc from 1992 to 2000.

He has been a long serving trustee of the Dulwich Picture Gallery, and a governor of the Yehudi Menuhin School.

== Personal life ==
Annesley married Caroline Lumley in 1968, and they have two sons.
