= Paul Raison =

Paul Raison may refer to:

- Paul Raison (athlete)
- Paul Raison (art historian)
