= Gregory Martin (art historian) =

British art historian

Gregory Martin is a British art historian. As one of the world's leading experts on Rubens, he is on the editorial board of the Rubenianum, Antwerp. He has been entrusted with cataloguing the Flemish School paintings of the Rijksmuseum, Amsterdam. Martin started his career as a curator at the National Gallery, London, before joining Christie's, where he subsequently headed the Old Masters Department, employing Paul Raison and Anthony Crichton-Stuart.

His work on Rubens has notably focused on the artist's London period in the employ of King James I. As such he is an important authority on the decoration of Inigo Jones's Banqueting House, the only surviving part of the Royal Palace of Whitehall. His work at the National Gallery included the first modern catalogue of the paintings of the Flemish School.

He is the grandson of the art historian Sir Alec Martin.

== Publications ==
- The Flemish School (London, National Gallery, 1970)
- Rubens: The Ceiling Decoration of the Banqueting Hall (2 volumes, London, 2005)
- Rubens in London: Art and Diplomacy (Brepols, 2011)
