= John Crichton-Stuart, 6th Marquess of Bute =

Scottish peer, benefactor and patron of the arts

The Most Honourable The Marquess of Bute KBE FRSE FRSA
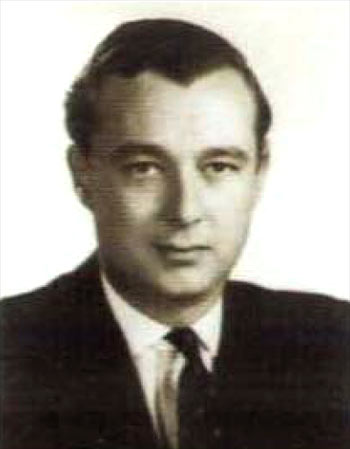

Personal details
- Born: 27 February 1933 Mayfair, London, England
- Died: 21 July 1993 (aged 60) Mount Stuart House
- Cause of death: Cancer
- Spouses: Beatrice Weld-Forester (m. 1955; div. 1977) Jennifer Home-Rigg (m. 1978)
- Children: Lady Sophia Bain; Lady Caroline Crichton-Stuart; John Crichton-Stuart, 7th Marquess of Bute; Lord Anthony Crichton-Stuart
- Parent(s): John Crichton-Stuart, 5th Marquess of Bute; Lady Eileen Forbes
- Education: Ampleforth College; Trinity College, Cambridge

John Crichton-Stuart, 6th Marquess of Bute, KBE FRSE FRSA (27 February 1933 – 21 July 1993) was a Scottish peer, benefactor and patron of the arts. He was largely known either as Lord Bute or simply John Bute.

== Life ==
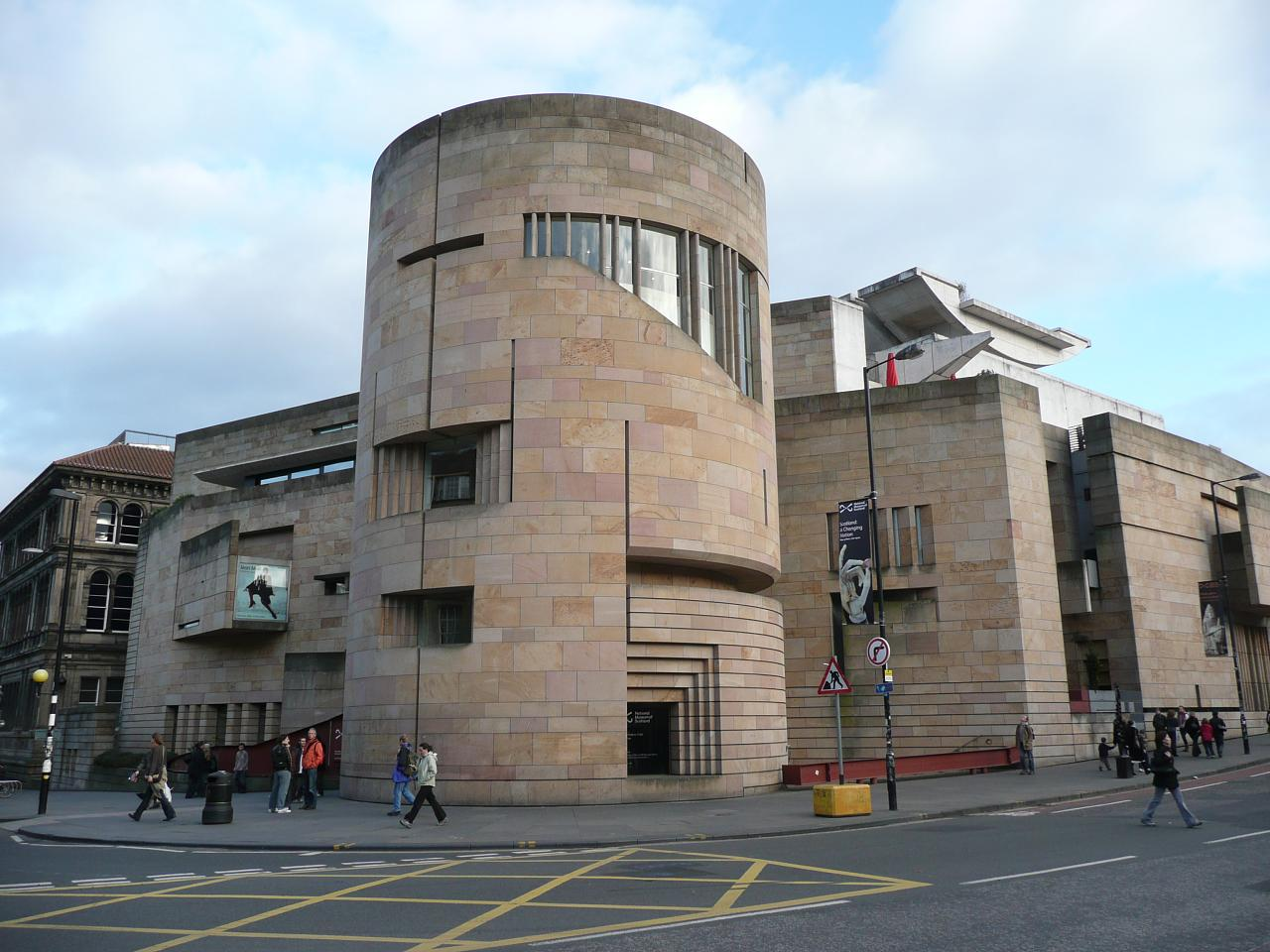
National Museum of Scotland in Edinburgh

John Crichton-Stuart was born in Mayfair, London, on 27 February 1933, fifteen minutes before his twin brother, David. As such, he was the eldest son of John Crichton-Stuart, 5th Marquess of Bute, and Lady Eileen Forbes, the younger daughter of Bernard Forbes, 8th Earl of Granard, and Beatrice Mills Forbes, an American socialite who was the daughter of Ogden Mills.

He was known as Lord Cardiff before the death of his grandfather in 1947, when he became Earl of Dumfries. He attended Ampleforth College and, after national service in the Scots Guards, studied history at Trinity College, Cambridge. At Cambridge he attended the Fine Art lectures of Nikolaus Pevsner.

Lord Bute was a private man who eschewed publicity and grand gestures and refused to take part in the activities of the House of Lords on the grounds that "the scene" was uncongenial. After his second marriage, he restored Mount Stuart House on the Isle of Bute.

On his father's death in 1956, Crichton-Stuart inherited his titles as well as estates in Wales, England, and Scotland, including six castles and a highly esteemed collection of European paintings. To settle death duties, he sold property in Cardiff to the city corporation and transferred Robert Adam houses on the south side of Charlotte Square, Edinburgh to the National Trust for Scotland. On the north side he transferred the central pavilion (5/6/7): 6 Charlotte Square, which he also transferred, became the official residence of the Secretary of State for Scotland and is known as Bute House due to its connection to him. No 7 is open to the public as The Georgian House.

In 1982, he was elected a Fellow of the Royal Society of Edinburgh. His proposers were Sir Alwyn Williams, Frank Willett, Colin Thompson, R. G. W. Anderson, C. D. Waterston and Charles Kemball.

From 1983 to 1988, he was Chairman of the Historic Buildings Council the forerunner to Historic Environment Scotland.

He was Lord Lieutenant of Bute and, from 1990, of Argyll and Bute. As owner of Bute Fabrics, the largest employer on the Isle of Bute, Crichton-Stuart redirected the focus of the company towards designer fabrics and contemporary furniture.

He held office in the National Trust for Scotland for twenty-five years, while its membership increased five-fold. From 1985, he was Chairman of the Trustees of the National Museums of Scotland, securing funding for the new west extension to the Royal Scottish Museum on Chambers Street in Edinburgh, now known as the Museum of Scotland. Despite opposition from Prince Charles, he ensured the project proceeded and saw the laying of the foundation stone in April 1993, shortly before his death.

Lord Bute died of cancer at Mount Stuart House on 21 July 1993.

== Family ==
On 19 April 1955, he married, firstly, Beatrice Nicola Grace Weld-Forester (b. 19 November 1933), daughter of Wolstan Beaumont Charles Weld-Forester and wife Anne Grace Christian Stirling-Home-Drummond-Moray, and they divorced in 1977. They had four children:

- Lady Sophia Ann Crichton-Stuart (born 27 February 1956), wife of the rock musician Jimmy Bain
- Lady Caroline Eileen Crichton-Stuart (21 February 1957 – 12 August 1984) She was killed instantly on Sunday August 12 1984 on the A15 in Leasingham in Lincolnshire in her Volkswagen Scirocco when hit by a stolen Ford Cortina driven by an 18 year old. The 18 year old received four and a half years in youth custody in December 1984, after pleading guilty.
- John Crichton-Stuart, 7th Marquess of Bute (26 April 1958 – 22 March 2021), also known as a racing driver under the name of Johnny Dumfries or John Bute. Raced in Formula One
- Lord Anthony Crichton-Stuart (born 14 May 1961)

In 1978 he married, secondly, Jennifer, daughter of John Home-Rigg and former wife of Gerald Percy. Jennifer, Marchioness of Bute, is a Patroness of the Royal Caledonian Ball.

== Appointments ==
- Convener of Buteshire County Council (1967–1970)
- Countryside Commission for Scotland (1970–1978)
- Development Commission (1973–1978)
- Oil Development Council for Scotland (1973–1978)
- Council of the Royal Society of Arts (1990–1992)
- Board of the British Council (1987–1992)
- Scottish Standing Committee for Voluntary International Aid, Chairman/President (1964–1968/1968–1975)
- Scottish Committee of the National Fund for Research into Crippling Diseases (1966–1993), Chairman
- Museums Advisory Board (Scotland), Chairman (1984–1985)
- Historic Buildings Council for Scotland (1983–1988), Chairman
- National Galleries of Scotland, Trustee (1980–1987)
- Royal Society of Edinburgh, Fellow (1992)

Honorary titles
Preceded by Ronald Graham	Lord Lieutenant of Buteshire; 1967–1974	Office abolished
Preceded by The Lord Maclean	Lord Lieutenant of Argyll and Bute; 1990–1993	Succeeded by The Duke of Argyll
Peerage of Great Britain
Preceded by John Crichton-Stuart	Marquess of Bute; 1956–1993	Succeeded by John Crichton-Stuart
