= Augusta Crichton-Stuart, Marchioness of Bute =

Anglo-Irish aristocrat

The Most Honourable The Marchioness of Bute DBE, GCStJ
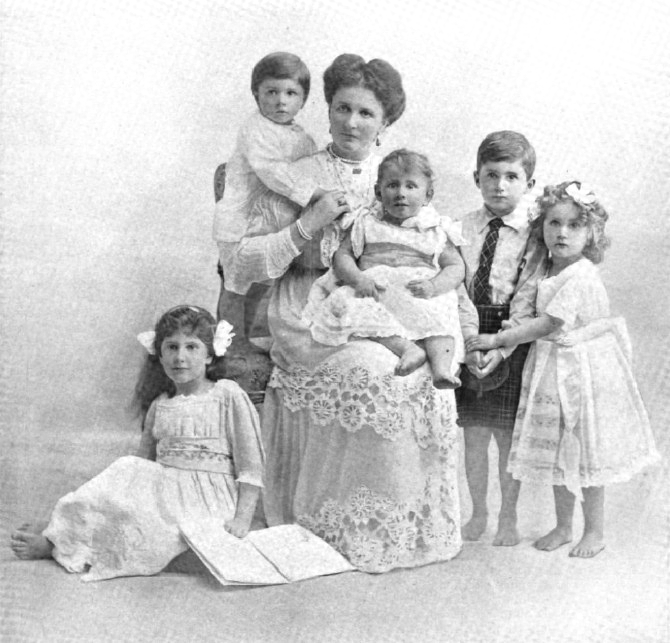
- Augusta Crichton-Stuart, Marchioness of Bute, with her children

Personal details
- Born: Augusta Mary Monica Bellingham; 19 August 1880
- Died: 16 May 1947 (aged 66) Rothesay, Scotland
- Spouse: John Crichton-Stuart, 4th Marquess of Bute (m. 1905; died 1947)
- Children: Lady Mary Walker; John Crichton-Stuart, 5th Marquess of Bute; Lady Jean Bertie; Lord Robert Crichton-Stuart; Lord David Crichton-Stuart; Lord Patrick Crichton-Stuart; Lord Rhidian Crichton-Stuart
- Parent(s): Sir Henry Bellingham, 4th Baronet; Lady Constance Noel

Augusta Mary Monica Crichton-Stuart, Marchioness of Bute, DBE GCStJ (née Bellingham; 19 August 1880 – 16 May 1947), was an Anglo-Irish aristocrat who was a daughter of Sir Henry Bellingham, 4th Baronet, and Lady Constance Julia Eleanor Georgiana Noel, daughter of Charles Noel, 2nd Earl of Gainsborough.

== Marriage and children ==
On 6 July 1905, she married John Crichton-Stuart, 4th Marquess of Bute (1881-1947), son of John Patrick Crichton-Stuart, 3rd Marquess of Bute, and Hon. Gwendolen Mary Anne Fitzalan-Howard. Both her father and her father-in-law were noted converts to Roman Catholicism. The wedding was held at Castle Bellingham, in the village of Castlebellingham in County Louth, Ireland, and was followed by a party at Mount Stuart House in Scotland. A film company was hired to film the event; and it served as one of the earliest examples of the aristocratic classes making a private film.

After her marriage, Augusta Bellingham was styled as The Marchioness of Bute and her married name became Crichton-Stuart. She and her husband had seven children:

- Lady Mary Crichton-Stuart (8 May 1906 – 1980); married Edward Walker and had children
- Sir John Crichton-Stuart, 5th Marquess of the County of Bute (4 August 1907 – 14 August 1956); married Lady Eileen Beatrice Forbes and had children
- Lady Jean Crichton-Stuart (28 October 1908 – 23 October 1995); married Lt.-Cmdr. Hon. James Bertie and had two sons; her elder son was Fra' Andrew Willoughby Ninian Bertie, Prince and Grand Master of the Sovereign Military Order of Malta from 1988 until his death in 2008.
- Lord Robert Crichton-Stuart (12 December 1909 – 1976); married Lady Janet Egida Montgomerie (1911–1999), daughter of Archibald Montgomerie, 16th Earl of Eglinton, and had children.
- Lord David Crichton-Stuart (8 February 1911 – 1970)); married Ursula Packe and had children.
- Lord Patrick Crichton-Stuart (1 February 1913 – 5 February 1956); married Jane von Bahr and had children.
- Lord Rhidian Crichton-Stuart (4 June 1917 – 25 June 1969); married Selina van Wijk and had children.

== War service ==
During the First World War, the marchioness opened up the family home at Mount Stuart as a military hospital. It was handed to the Admiralty and was a Naval Hospital from 1914-1918. She herself trained to carry out nursing duties, at the Scottish General Hospital at Stobhill.

In recognition of her services, she was invested as a Dame Commander of the Order of the British Empire (DBE) in 1918. She was also invested as a Dame of Grace, Order of St. John of Jerusalem, and decorated with the Médaille de la Reine Elisabeth of Belgium. She also worked as a nurse, known as Nurse Stuart, with Professor Hepburn at the Third Western Hospital in Cardiff.

== Death ==
Lord Bute died on 25 April 1947, aged 65. Lady Bute followed almost a month later, in Rothesay on 16 May 1947, aged 66.

== Ancestry ==
Ancestors of Augusta Crichton-Stuart, Marchioness of Bute

8. Sir Alan Bellingham, 2nd Baronet
4. Sir Alan Bellingham, 3rd Baronet
9. Elizabeth Walls
2. Sir Henry Bellingham, 4th Baronet
10. Henry Clarke
5. Elizabeth Clarke
11. (?)
1. Augusta Bellingham
12. Charles Noel, 1st Earl of Gainsborough
6. Charles Noel, 2nd Earl of Gainsborough
13. Elizabeth Grey
3. Lady Constance Noel
14. William Hay, 18th Earl of Erroll
7. Lady Ida Hay
15. Elizabeth FitzClarence
