= Timothy Raison =

British politician

The Right Honourable Sir Timothy Raison

Minister for Overseas Development
- In office 6 January 1983 – 10 September 1986
- Prime Minister: Margaret Thatcher
- Preceded by: Neil Marten
- Succeeded by: Chris Patten

Minister of State for Immigration
- In office 4 May 1979 – 6 January 1983
- Prime Minister: Margaret Thatcher
- Preceded by: Brynmor John
- Succeeded by: David Waddington

Shadow Secretary of State for the Environment
- In office 11 February 1975 – 19 November 1976
- Leader: Margaret Thatcher
- Preceded by: Margaret Thatcher
- Succeeded by: Michael Heseltine

Member of Parliament for Aylesbury
- In office 18 June 1970 – 16 March 1992
- Preceded by: Spencer Summers
- Succeeded by: David Lidington

Personal details
- Born: Timothy Hugh Francis Raison; 3 November 1929 London, England
- Died: 3 November 2011 (aged 82) Oxford, England
- Party: Conservative
- Spouse: Veldes Charrington (m. 1956)
- Children: 4, including Paul
- Parent: Max Raison (father)
- Education: Christ Church, Oxford

Sir Timothy Hugh Francis Raison (3 November 1929 – 3 November 2011) was a British Conservative politician and journalist. He was the MP for Aylesbury from 1970 to 1992, and served in the government of Margaret Thatcher.

== Early life and education ==
Raison was born in Upper Norwood, Lambeth, London, in 1929. He was the son of publisher and editor Maxwell Raison, general manager of Picture Post, and his wife Celia, Raison was educated, through being a scholarship boy, at two independent schools: at Dragon School in Oxford, where he became Head of School. From there he got a scholarship to Eton College, then to Christ Church, Oxford, to which he also attained a scholarship. He performed his national service with the Durham Light Infantry, where he was a second lieutenant.

== Career ==
Raison began his career as a journalist, first working on Picture Post, then New Scientist. Whilst at New Scientist he also edited Crossbow, journal of the Bow Group (a centre-right group within the Conservative Party).

According to Christopher Chataway, it was Raison, then still a journalist, who first came up with the idea of a World Refugee Year in 1958: 'It came from Tim Raison, who was a friend of mine and, like me, wanted to be a Conservative member of parliament ... He floated the idea past me and I thought it was terrific. He, I and two other journalists, Trevor Philpott and Colin Jones, wrote an article [in the Spring 1958 edition of Crossbow entitled "A Plan to Save the Refugees"] which was the start of the idea'.

In 1960 Raison received The Nansen Refugee Award, which is given annually by the United Nations High Commissioner for Refugees in recognition of outstanding service to the cause of refugees. He co-founded and edited the social science magazine New Society from 1962 until 1968 and was MP for Aylesbury from 1970 until his retirement in 1992. He served as a junior Education and Science Minister (1973–1974).

Raison served as a Home Office minister from 1979 to 1983, under then Home Secretary William Whitelaw, (later hereditary peer Viscount Whitelaw). He then served as Minister for Overseas Development (1983–1986).

== Personal life and death ==
In 1956, Raison married violin teacher Veldes Julia Charrington, daughter of John Arthur Pepys Charrington, of Netherton, Hurstbourne Tarrant, Hampshire, president of the Charrington Brewery and Master of the Worshipful Company of Brewers in 1952, of that landed gentry family of Cherry Orchard, Shaftesbury, Dorset; they had a son, Paul Raison, and three daughters.

On 3 November 2011, Raison died on his 82nd birthday from complications of an abdominal aortic aneurysm at John Radcliffe Hospital in Oxford.

== Honours ==
- He was made a Member of Her Majesty's Most Honourable Privy Council in the 1982 New Years Honours List.
- He was knighted on 31 December 1990.

Parliament of the United Kingdom
| Preceded by Spencer Summers | Member of Parliament for Aylesbury; 1970–1992 | Succeeded by David Lidington |
Political offices
| Preceded by Neil Marten | Minister for Overseas Development; 1983–1986 | Succeeded by Chris Patten |
