= Lord Rhidian Crichton-Stuart =

Lord Rhidian Crichton-Stuart (4 June 1917 – 25 June 1969) was a son of The 4th Marquess of Bute and Augusta, Marchioness of Bute.

Lord Rhidian Crichton-Stuart was educated at Ampleforth College and at Magdalene College, Cambridge. He gained the rank of captain in the service of the Royal Artillery (RARO). He was admitted to Royal Company of Archers in 1948. He was a British member of the International Legislative Assembly of the Tangier International Zone from 1953 to 1956. He was a Knight of Obedience, of the Sovereign Military Order of Malta. He died on 25 June 1969, aged 52.

== Marriage/Children ==
He married Selina Gerth van Wijk on 20 July 1939. They had the following children:

- Frederick John Patrick Crichton-Stuart (born 6 September 1940, died 14 June 2011)
- Mary Margot Patricia Crichton-Stuart (born 18 March 1942)
- Major Jerome Niall Anthony Crichton-Stuart (born 1 January 1948)

His eldest son, Frederick (9 June 1940 – 14 June 2011), also known as Fra' Fredrik Crichton-Stuart, was Grand Prior of the Sovereign Military Order of Malta Grand Priory of England. He headed Una Voce (Scotland), part of the international body of Una Voce, of which he was president (2005–2006). Una Voce actively promotes and encourages the use of and petitions for wider indults in facilitating the traditional Tridentine Mass in the Catholic liturgy.

== Links ==
- Profile, thepeerage.com; accessed 26 March 2016.
