= 120 and 122 East 92nd Street =

Houses in Manhattan, New York

- Houses at 120 and 122 East 92nd Street
- U.S. National Register of Historic Places
- New York State Register of Historic Places
- New York City Landmark
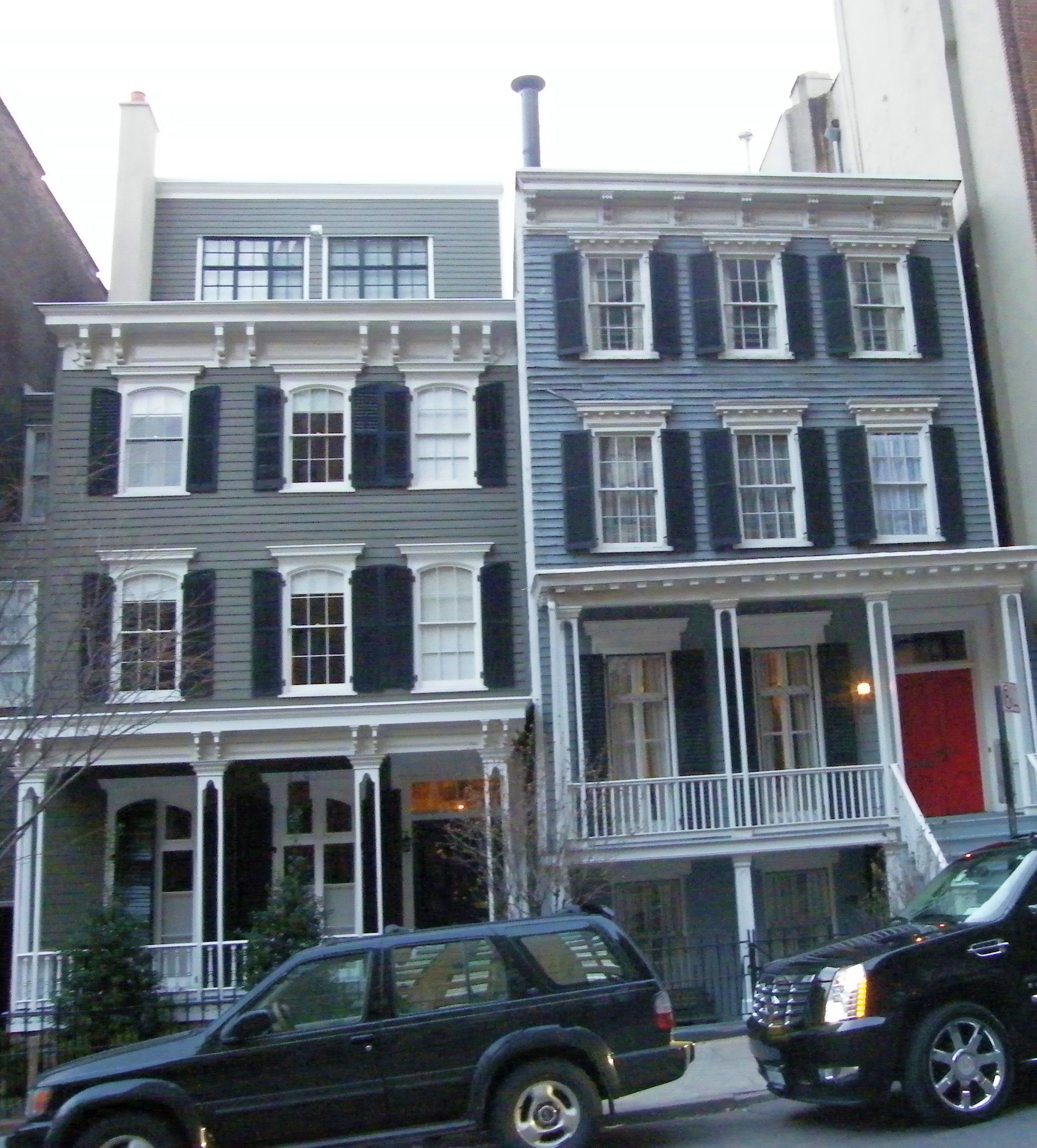

- Location within Manhattan Location within New York City Location within New York Location within the United States
- Location: 120–122 East 92nd St., New York, New York
- Coordinates: 40°47′00″N 73°57′15″W
- Area: less than one acre
- Built: 1859 and 1871
- Built by: Albro Howell
- Architectural style: Italianate
- NRHP reference No.: 82001195
- NYSRHP No.: 06101.000661, 06101.000662
- NYCL No.: 0589, 0590

Significant dates
- Added to NRHP: 1982-10-29
- Designated NYSRHP: 1982-09-27
- Designated NYCL: 1969-11-19

120 and 122 East 92nd Street are a pair of Italianate houses on the Upper East Side of Manhattan in New York City, New York, US. The two houses are both made of wood and are the earliest of their type remaining on the city block. 120 East 92nd Street has a brick basement and three stories. 122 East 92nd Street, although similar, has a penthouse level recessed above the original roofline. The buildings were designated by the New York City Landmarks Preservation Commission as landmarks in 1969. They are also listed on the National Register of Historic Places.

== Description ==
120 and 122 East 92nd Street are located in the Carnegie Hill section of the Upper East Side of Manhattan in New York City, New York, US. Both houses are among the area's few remaining wooden houses, as wood-frame construction south of 155th Street was banned in 1882. Another wood-frame house is located one block east at 160 East 92nd Street. The houses at 120 and 122 East 92nd Street were described in one source as "reflect[ing] the semi-rural simplicity of another era". Mimi Sheraton of The New York Times, visiting the building on the recommendation of the AIA Guide to New York City, wrote in 2002 that numbers 120 and 122 were "looking dangerously fragile".

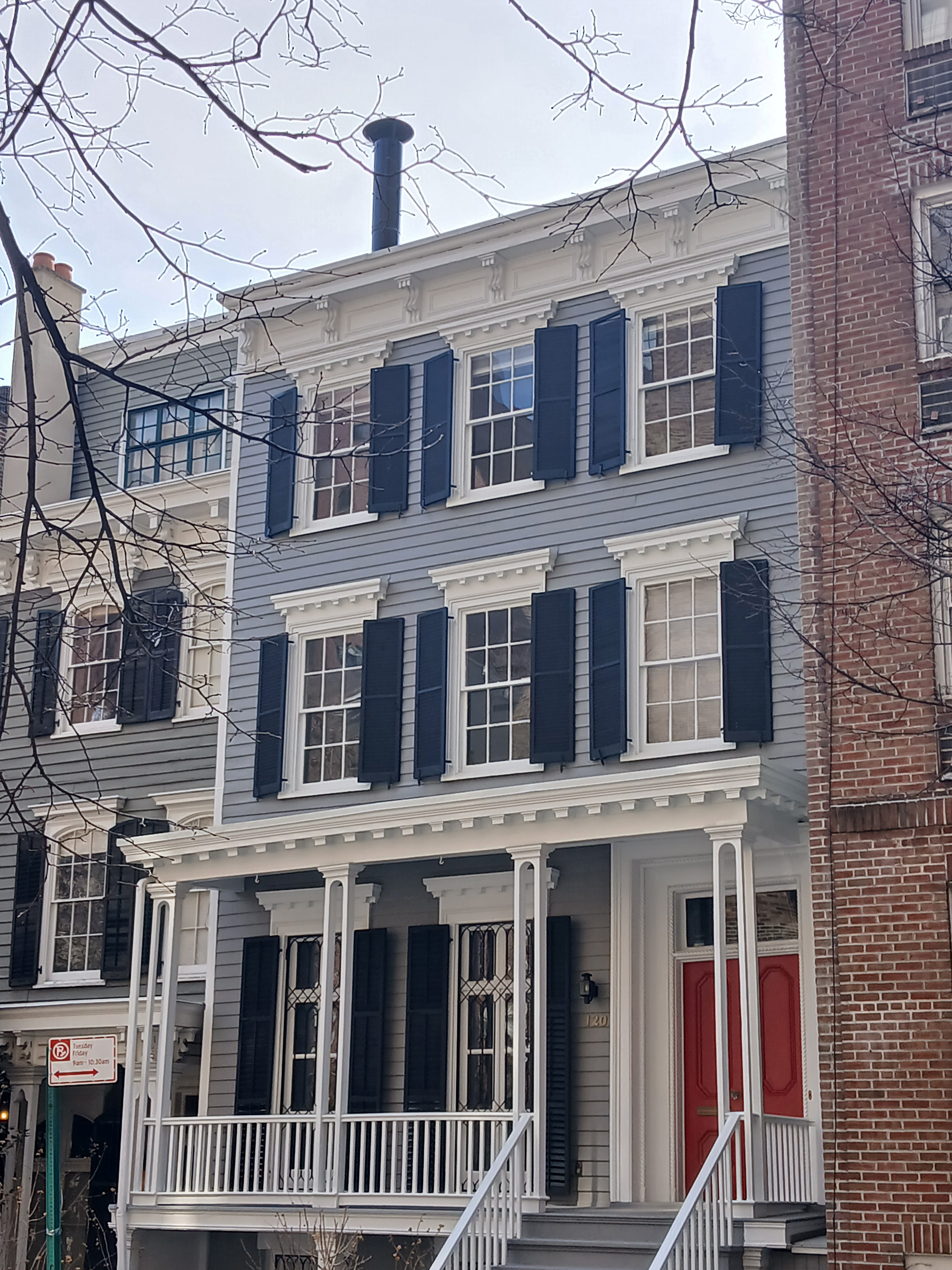
120 East 92nd Street

120 East 92nd Street has a brick basement and three stories. Its architect is not documented. An iron railing separates the sidewalk from the front yard. There is a portico in front of the first-floor entrance, reached by a steep wooden staircase. The portico contains openwork columns, behind which are three bays of openings: French windows to the left and center, and a double door with elaborate moldings on the right. On the second and third stories, there are three wood-framed sash windows per floor, which are flanked by shutters. Cornices, decorated with modillions, run above these windows. The house is topped by a flat roof. Inside, many of the original decorative details remain intact, including an entrance vestibule with etched glass, along with an entrance hall with a staircase. The house's first story has a living room with a fireplace, a dining room, a kitchen, and a rear balcony facing the garden. The second floor has a bedroom overlooking the garden, and there is another level with two bedrooms at the top.

122 East 92nd Street, although similar to its neighbor, has a penthouse level recessed above the original roofline. This building may have been designed by Albro Howell, the contractor for both houses. An iron railing separates the sidewalk from the front yard. Number 122 has a portico at its first story, which is substantially lower than that of number 120; this portico is accessed by a staircase and contains openwork columns. Behind the porticos are three bays of openings: segmentally arched French doors to the left and center, and a doorway to the right, behind the columns. On the second and third stories, there are three wood-framed sash windows per floor, which are flanked by shutters and have segmentally arched tops. Above the third story is a cornice, with panels interspersed with pairs of brackets. The house has a flat roof. A recessed fourth-story penthouse rises above the roof, and there is another two-story addition extending off the left (eastern) end of the house. Inside, the building retains many of its original decorative details, including an entrance hall with a staircase, along with marble fireplaces. The library is on one of the upper floors, while the kitchen and dining room are in the basement. The penthouse contains a studio, and there is also a garden room extending off the rear of the first story.

== History ==
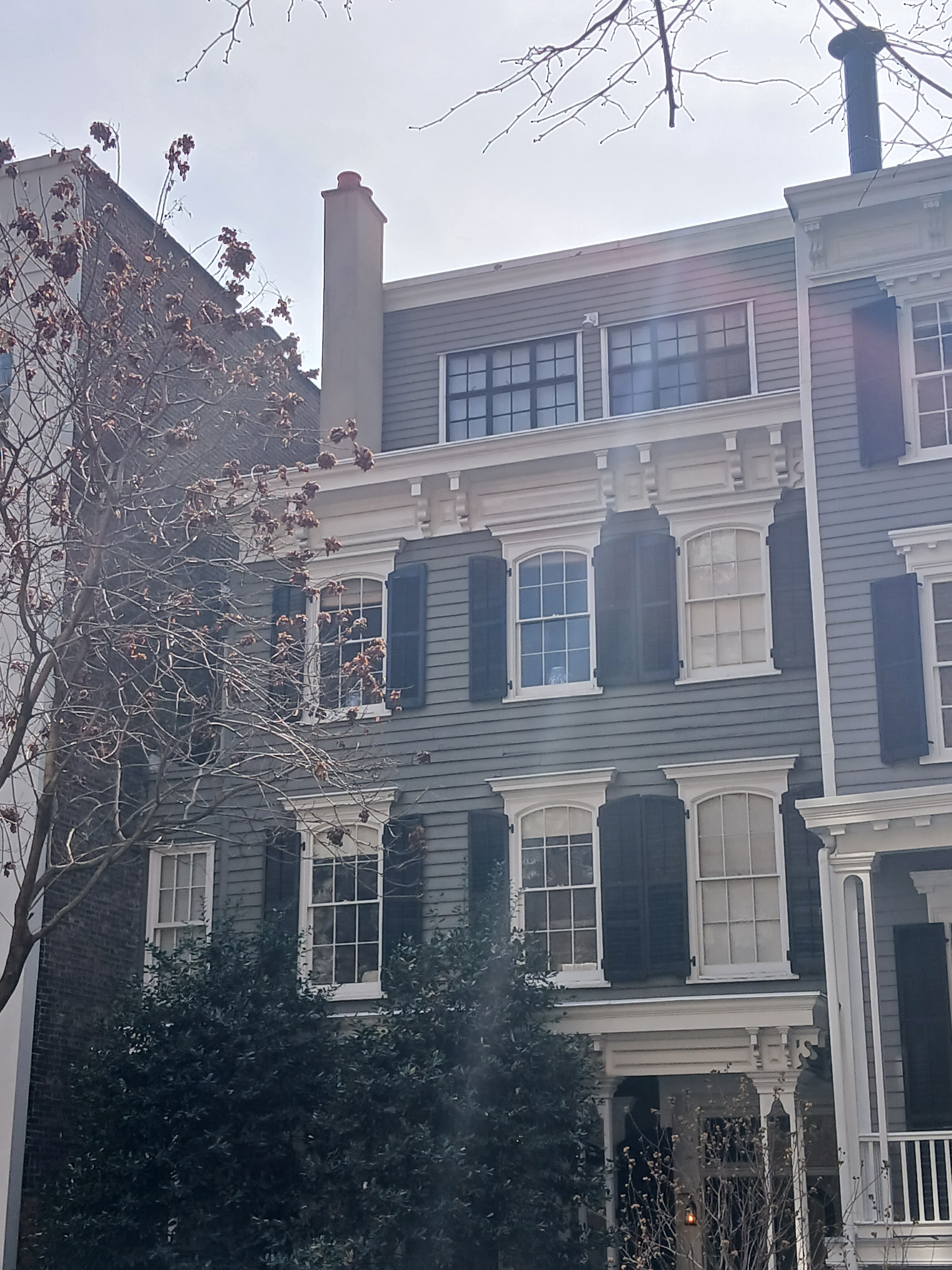
122 East 92nd Street (seen here with its penthouse) was built first, in 1859.

The building at 122 East 92nd Street was built in 1859 and is the oldest remaining structure on the block of 92nd Street between Park and Lexington avenues. Like other wood-frame residences in the area, the houses were intended for middle-class residents. Number 122 was originally home to a custom house agent, Adam C. Flanagan; he owned it only until 1861, when Hampton D. Gage bought it. 120 East 92nd Street was built in 1871. Its first resident was a wine merchant, John C. Rennert, who had acquired the land from Flanagan. By then, several buildings were being built on neighboring plots, including 121–123 East 92nd Street across the street; further brownstone and masonry buildings were constructed on that block in the 1880s. The Rennert family rented out number 120, and a bathroom was added on the third floor of that property c. 1880. Rennert's widow Catherine continued to own 120 East 92nd Street until 1888, when Henrietta Nathan bought it.

The cooper Anton Hoffmann bought number 120 in 1890, and his family owned that house for the next seven decades. Number 122, meanwhile, was owned by the stone merchant Henry Hanlein, whose family remained there at least until the 1930s. A penthouse was built above the roof of 122 East 92nd Street in 1927. By the mid-20th century, 120 and 122 East 92nd Street were among the only remaining wood-frame houses on the Upper East Side, along with 160 East 92nd Street and 128 East 93rd Street. Nemone Palestin acquired number 120 in 1958 and renovated it extensively; at the time, that house had faulty mechanical systems and only a single light switch. Palestin rebuilt the interior staircase and walls, and she shored up the back of the house; at the recommendation of Brooklyn Navy Yard personnel, she used an acetylene torch to destroy a tank in the basement. The ground floor and the upper three floors were split into separate units.

The New York City Landmarks Preservation Commission (LPC) designated both houses as individual city landmarks in 1969. The houses were not initially listed as part of the LPC's Carnegie Hill Historic District when that district was designated in 1974. When the Carnegie Hill Historic District was expanded in 1993, both structures were included in the expanded district. The houses were added to the National Register of Historic Places in 1982. In 1996, the family of British art historian Anthony Crichton-Stuart bought 120 East 92nd Street; they subsequently renovated the building. By 2005, the Goldrach family—which owned number 122—was repairing the porch, woodwork, and mechanical systems. At the time, the building had fallen into disrepair. Number 120 was also renovated by the Crichton-Stuart family, and by the 2010s it was being leased out.

== See also ==
- List of New York City Designated Landmarks in Manhattan from 59th to 110th Streets
- National Register of Historic Places listings in Manhattan from 59th to 110th Streets
- 312 and 314 East 53rd Street, wooden houses in Midtown Manhattan

== Sources ==
- National Register of Historic Places Inventory/Nomination: Houses at Houses at 120 and 122 East 92nd Street (PDF) (Report). National Park Service. 1982. With accompanying pictures
- Expanded Carnegie Hill Historic District (PDF) (Report). New York City Landmarks Preservation Commission. December 21, 1993.
