= Max Raison =

English cricketer

Personal information
- Full name: Maxwell Raison
- Born: 17 November 1901; Wanstead, Essex, England
- Died: 26 July 1988 (aged 86); Theberton, Suffolk, England
- Batting: Right-handed
- Bowling: Right-arm medium

Domestic team information
- Years: Team
- 1928–1930: Essex

Career statistics
Competition	First-class
Matches	17
Runs scored	451
Batting average	18.04
100s/50s	0/1
Top score	57
Balls bowled	920
Wickets	14
Bowling average	41.07
5 wickets in innings	1
10 wickets in match	0
Best bowling	5/104
Catches/stumpings	6/–
- Source: Cricinfo, 10 October 2011

Maxwell Raison (7 November 1901 – 26 July 1988) was an English cricketer and publisher. Raison was a right-handed batsman who bowled right-arm medium pace. He also co-founded the New Scientist. He was born at Wanstead, Essex, and educated at Forest School, Walthamstow.

Raison made his first-class debut for Essex against Oxford University in 1928. He made sixteen further first-class appearances, the last of which came against Yorkshire in the 1930 County Championship. In his seventeen first-class appearances for Essex, he scored 451 runs at an average of 18.04, with a high score of 57. This score, which was his only first-class fifty, came against Hampshire in 1928. With the ball, he took 14 wickets at a bowling average of 41.07, with best figures of 5/104. These figures, which were his only first-class five wicket haul, came against Gloucestershire in 1928, including the wicket of Wally Hammond who had scored 244 runs.

He was publisher and managing editor of Picture Post. He was also co-founder of New Scientist magazine.

Raison died at Theberton, Suffolk, on 26 July 1988, leaving five sons, one of whom was Timothy Raison. His grandchildren include the actress Miranda Raison and the art historian Paul Raison.
