= 312 and 314 East 53rd Street =

Houses in Manhattan, New York

Coordinates: 40°45′22.9″N 73°57′59.7″W

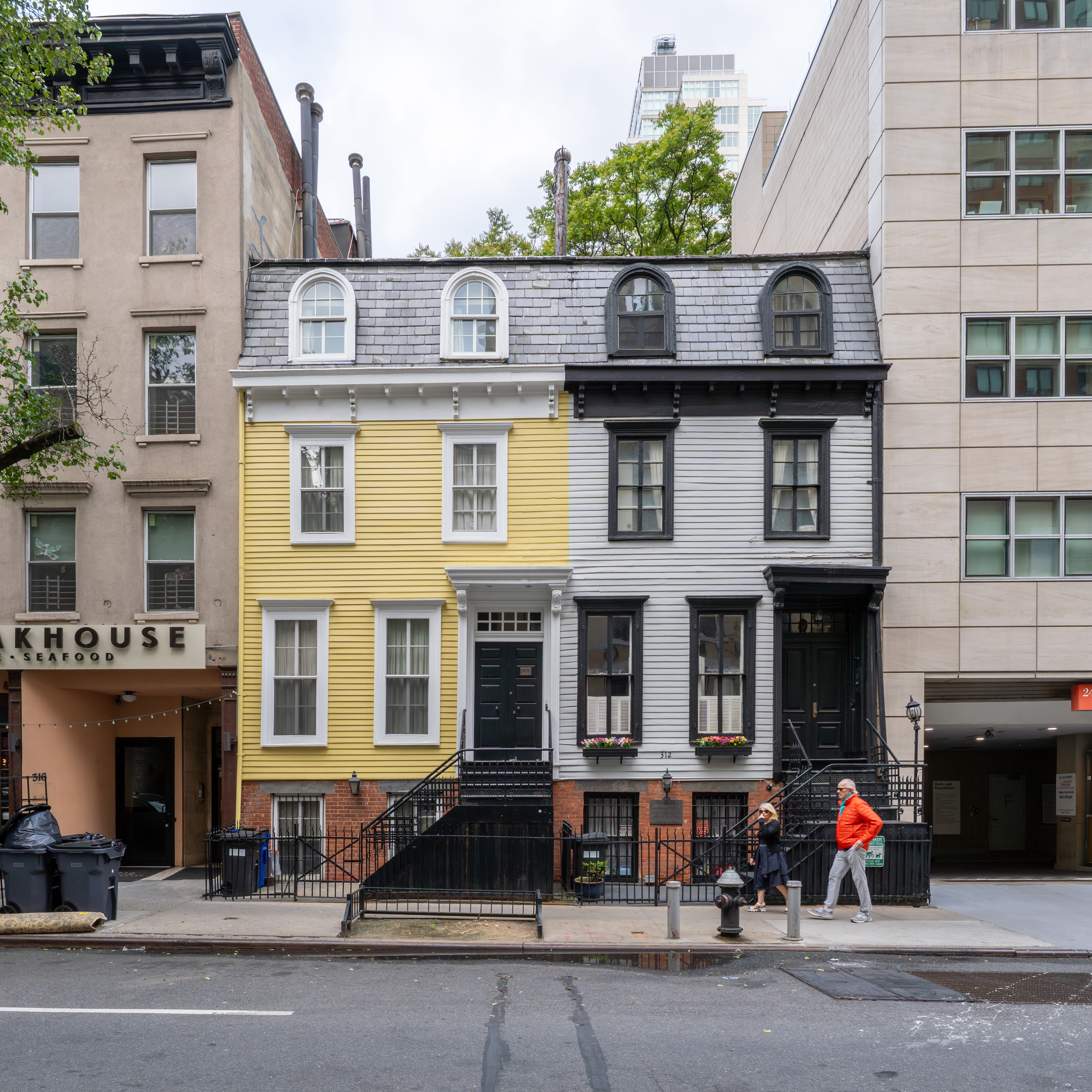
From left to right: 314 and 312 East 53rd Street

312 and 314 East 53rd Street are two wooden row houses on 53rd Street, between First Avenue and Second Avenue, in the Turtle Bay neighborhood of Manhattan in New York City. The row houses were designed by Robert and James Cunningham with French Second Empire and Italianate details. The houses are two of seven remaining wooden houses on the East Side of Manhattan north of 23rd Street.

The houses both consist of three stories above a raised brick basement. On both houses, the facade of the first story is asymmetrical, with two windows to the left of an entrance doorway. The second story is symmetrical, with two windows, while the mansard roof above both houses has two dormer windows. The interior areas of both houses slightly differ, with number 314 being slightly larger than number 312.

The Cunninghams built the houses between 1865 and 1866 just as new fire codes were enacted in the neighborhood, preventing the construction of new wooden buildings. The houses were likely speculative developments, as neither Cunningham resided at either house. Residents over the years have included New York City Ballet cofounder Lincoln Kirstein, artist Muriel Draper, and dancer Paul Draper at number 312, as well as writer Edmund Wilson at number 314. The New York City Landmarks Preservation Commission designated number 312 as a city landmark in 1968. Number 314 was also considered for landmark status in the 1960s but was not similarly designated until 2000.

== Site ==
The houses at 312 and 314 East 53rd Street are in the Turtle Bay neighborhood of Manhattan in New York City. The houses occupy the southern sidewalk of 53rd Street, in the middle of the block between First Avenue to the east and Second Avenue to the west. Both houses have a frontage of 18 feet (5.5 m) along 49th Street. The land lots each have an area of approximately 1,807.5 square feet (168 m^{2}) (Note: According to the New York City Department of City Planning, 312 East 53rd Street has a lot area of 1,808 square feet (168.0 m^{2}) and 314 East 53rd Street has a lot area of 1,807 square feet (167.9 m^{2}), despite their otherwise identical lot dimensions.) and a depth of 100 feet (30 m). Nearby buildings and places include the Rockefeller Guest House one block southwest, 303 East 51st Street two blocks south, and the Neighborhood Playhouse School of the Theatre and East 54th Street Bath and Gymnasium one block north.

Until the mid-19th century, what is now Turtle Bay was relatively undeveloped, as it was hard to access from Lower Manhattan. The city block containing the two houses was within the farm of David Devore, which itself was traversed by the Eastern Post Road. Turtle Bay was developed with factories and residences starting in the mid-19th century. The block was subdivided into lots in 1830, but the road was not closed until 1852. The houses at 312 and 314 East 53rd Street were built within the former path of the road, which led to their unusual lot dimensions.

== Architecture ==
312 and 314 East 53rd Street are identical wooden houses designed by Robert and James Cunningham with French Second Empire and Italianate details. The houses are two of seven remaining wooden houses on the East Side of Manhattan north of 23rd Street. The houses also contain brick sidewalls for partial fireproofing. While wooden structures in Manhattan had been outlawed during the late 19th century, the houses at 312 and 314 East 53rd Street were grandfathered into the updated fire codes. Under later New York City Department of Buildings codes, the non-fireproof buildings did not have to contain "extraordinary precautions" if they did not house more than two families.

312 and 314 East 53rd Street both contain raised basements that are clad in brick. The entrances to both houses are on the right (west) sides of the respective houses and are both approached by stoops. The stoops for both houses have metal treads and railings, as well as a wrought-iron fence and gate at the sidewalk level. In front of either house, the stoop ascends from the left side of the house, parallel to the sidewalk, then turns at a 90-degree angle toward the entrance.

The first story of both houses is asymmetrical, with the entrance on the right side of each house, as well as two double-hung windows on the left side. Above the wooden entrance doorway of either house is a glass transom window with a two-by-five grid of transom lights. The first-floor windows have vertical muntins which are intended to resemble casement windows. On the second floor of either house are two windows, which are symmetrically aligned to the respective houses. On both stories of either house, the windows are surrounded by simple moldings, and the lintels atop each window project outward. A cornice supported by brackets runs above the second story of either house. The two houses share a mansard roof. Each house's portion of the roof contains two symmetrically aligned dormer windows with semicircular hoods. At number 314, the original dormer windows and slate roof have been replaced, but the houses otherwise retain much of their original appearance. The New York Times described the dormers as appearing "as if they belonged on a dollhouse".

The interiors of the houses are asymmetrical in area; number 312 has a gross floor area of 2,272 square feet (211.1 m^{2}) and number 314 has a gross floor area of 2,836 square feet (263.5 m^{2}). Number 314 has three bedrooms and a backyard covering 900 square feet (84 m^{2}). Number 312 also has three bedrooms, as well as a two-level backyard of 1,200 square feet (110 m^{2}). Within number 312 are a kitchen and dining room in the basement; a library, living room, and foyer on the first floor; two bedrooms, an office, and a bathroom on the second floor; and a master bedroom with five closets and a bathroom on the top floor.

== History ==
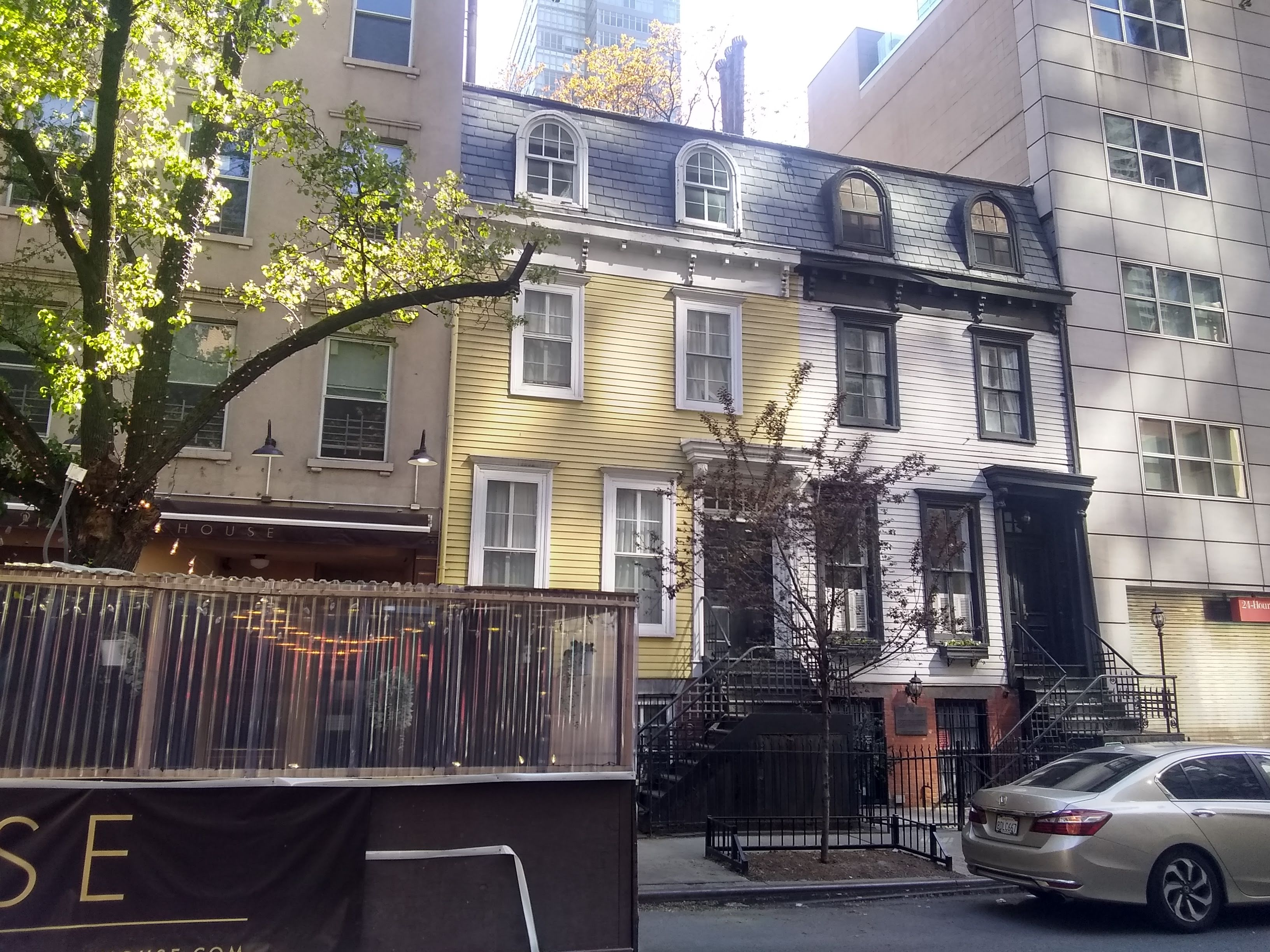
Seen from the east

As Manhattan developed, wooden houses were often the earliest structures to be built in a given area. However, they were susceptible to destruction by fire and they were often replaced by fireproof masonry buildings. Following numerous major fires, the government of New York City designated a "fire line" across the island of Manhattan, south of which new wooden buildings could not be erected. This line, initially designated at 14th Street, was moved north several times over the 19th century. The fire line was moved to 86th Street in 1866, which would have placed the sites of 312 and 314 East 53rd Street under the new restrictions.

=== 19th century ===
In October 1865, builder Robert Cunningham and contractor James Cunningham purchased the lots at 312-316 East 53rd Street. It is unknown whether the two men were related. At the time, the lots contained a stable and workshop complex. The Cunninghams built two wooden houses at 312 and 314 East 53rd Street, which were completed in 1866, just as the fire line was relocated. Consequently, they were among the last wooden structures to be built in the area. The houses were likely speculative developments built in advance of potential tenants, as neither Cunningham resided at either house. The first tenants to be recorded in the two houses were notary and minister Charles Nanz, who lived at number 312, and contractor Thomas Taylor, who lived at number 314.

By the 1870 United States census, twenty people were recorded as living behind both houses. Access to the rear of the houses was through the lot at 316 East 53rd Street, which was developed in 1871 with a tenement. Milkman Francis Lahey bought 314 and 316 East 53rd Street in 1872, living at number 314 and using the rear stables on his own. Lahey sold his properties in 1883 (Note: Landmarks Preservation Commission 2000, p. 3, cites the date as 1884.) to undertaker Bernhard Kolb, who used the rear structures as a garage. Kolb filed plans for alterations to 312 and 316 East 53rd Street in 1887, consisting of a two-story, 18-by-12-foot extension to the rear of number 312, as well as the removal of part of the rear wall of number 316. Around that time, Elle Crawford resided at number 312.

=== Early and mid-20th century ===
No other significant changes were made to the two houses until June 1909, when the properties were sold in partial exchange for an apartment building; the new owner continued to lease out the property. Isidor Blumenkrohn was recorded in October 1909 as having sold the houses to Adolph Steinhart. In 1910, Uhlfelder and Weinberg bought the houses. The stables in the rear were demolished around 1921, according to demolition applications filed around that date. Both houses were sold in 1924 by Matteo Cassamissiama to Isaac Albert, who promptly resold them to Sophia Diamone.

Sometime in the mid-20th century, number 312 was home to Lincoln Kirstein, who later cofounded the New York City Ballet. Artist Muriel Draper moved into number 312 by the late 1920s, along with her son, dancer Paul Draper. Their neighbor was writer Edmund Wilson, who rented number 314 in 1932 for $50 per month. At the time, Wilson was grieving the death of his wife Margaret, and he decided to take up residence at what he considered to be a shabby residence. Wilson sometimes allowed friends to sleep over in the basement, including poet T. S. Eliot, who stayed overnight in May 1933. Wilson told F. Scott Fitzgerald that he enjoyed having "no doorman, no telephone" and wrote to John Dos Passos about the garden. Wilson had moved out of number 314 by mid-1935; that house was rented to Paul A. Kaylor in June 1935, and Gladys Pratt leased that unit the following March. Number 312 was rented to Dorothy MacKnight in 1935 and was leased by Don Russeau Inc. in 1937.

In May 1952, number 312 was recorded as having been sold by Margretta Cort to Perdita Schaffner. Around the same time, literary agent John Schaffner was recorded as the new owner of number 312. According to a 1969 newspaper article, the house had cost $41,000, but according to The New York Times, the house had cost about $85,000. That October, Francis Robinson sold number 314 to Irving Fisher. Window dresser Cecilia Staples moved into number 314 by 1961. The Times described number 314's facade as having been painted a "shocking pink", while the interior was also home to "a Weimaraner, a pug, a macaw, a myna bird, two tortoises and eighteen goldfish".

=== Late 20th century to present ===
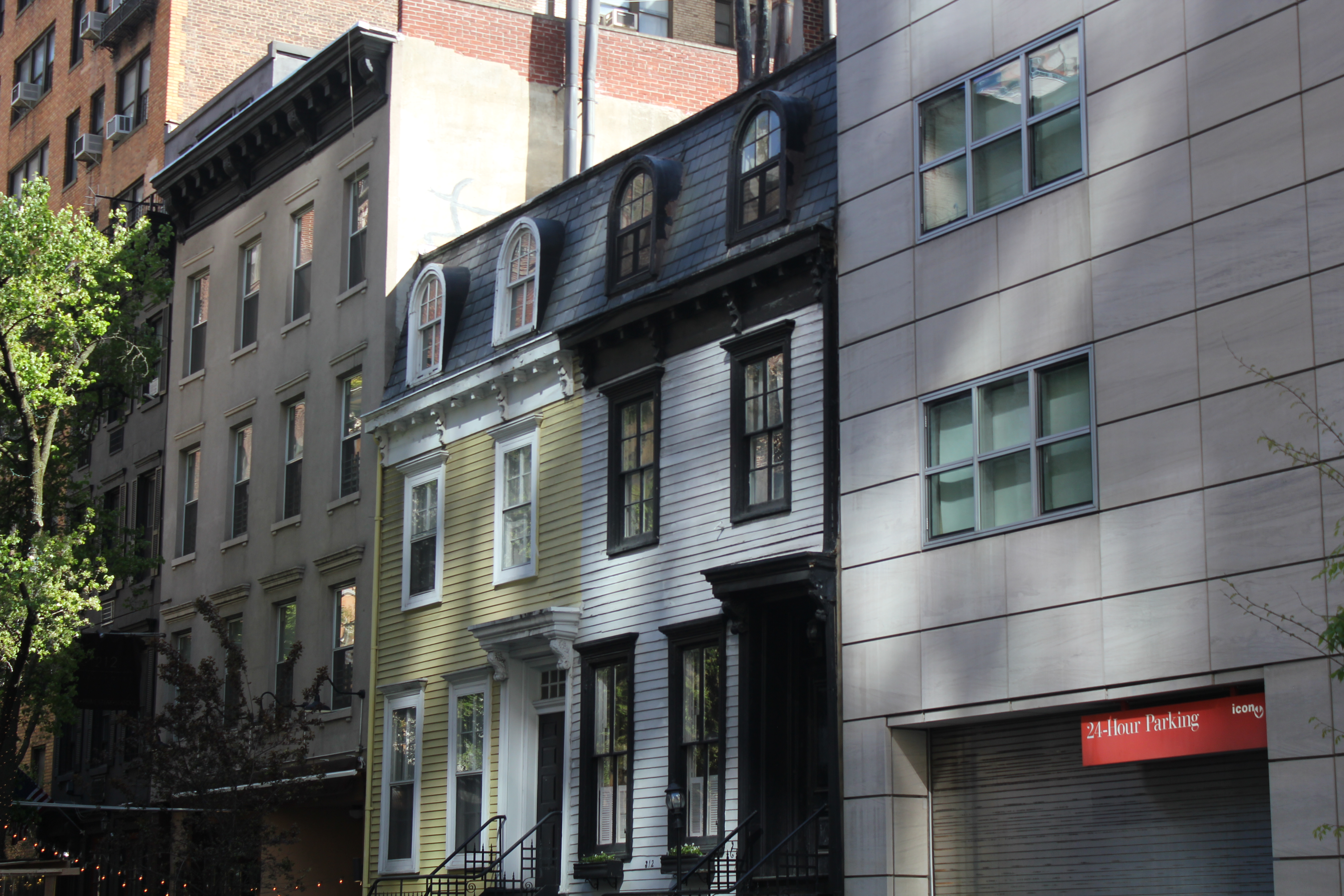
View from west, with the newer apartment building at right

The New York City Landmarks Preservation Commission (LPC), created in 1965, considered both of the wooden houses for landmark protection shortly after its creation. At the time, a developer was buying the southeastern corner of Second Avenue and 53rd Street, with the intention of erecting an apartment complex. The LPC held landmark hearings for both houses during December 1966 and January 1967. John Schaffner requested that his house at number 312 be preserved, as he had turned down an offer of $185,000. As a result, 312 East 53rd Street was designated as a city landmark on October 12, 1968, effectively blocking the assemblage of the site for the proposed apartment. Schaffner's neighbor at 314 East 53rd Street, Donald Parson Jr., wanted to sell the property and was uninterested in designation. The LPC did not designate 314 East 53rd Street at that time, even though other structures, such as Grand Central Terminal, had been designated as landmarks over their owners' opposition.

In April 1969, Parson sold the deed for 314 East 53rd Street to Daisy H. Lewis, who resold it to Stephen R. Reiner that July. Reiner then sold number 314 in 1982 to Robert K. Marceca, who operated the real estate company RKM Enterprises. Under RKM Enterprises' occupancy, the facade of number 314 was covered in aluminum siding that was designed to look like wooden clapboard. Kenneth Sugarman, who according to city documents was appointed as a referee in an action between Marceca and the Nassau Federal Savings and Loan Association, sold that house to 314 East 53rd Street Associates in 1989. Next door, Schaffner had sold number 312 in 1986 to John D. Lack, who in turn sold the house in 1994 to Zarela Martinez.

In 2000, developer Harry B. Macklowe bought number 314 and planned to raze it for an apartment structure. Martinez, owner of number 312, was among those who wished for the LPC to designate number 314. Macklowe was already in contract to buy number 314, and LPC chairwoman Jennifer Raab could not do anything other than appeal to Macklowe to not destroy the house Macklowe met with Raab and subsequently agreed to give up number 314, which was designated as a city landmark on June 20, 2000. Raab said of the designation: "We're lucky that we had the opportunity to put this pair back together, never to be separated again." Number 314 was placed for sale in 2009 and purchased by the Fong family in 2010. Number 312 was purchased in 2012 by the Nacheman family, who put the property for sale in 2016.

== See also ==
- List of New York City Designated Landmarks in Manhattan from 14th to 59th Streets
- 120 and 122 East 92nd Street, wooden houses on the Upper East Side
