= 53rd Street (Manhattan) =

East-west street in Manhattan, New York

Coordinates: 40°45′46″N 73°58′54″W

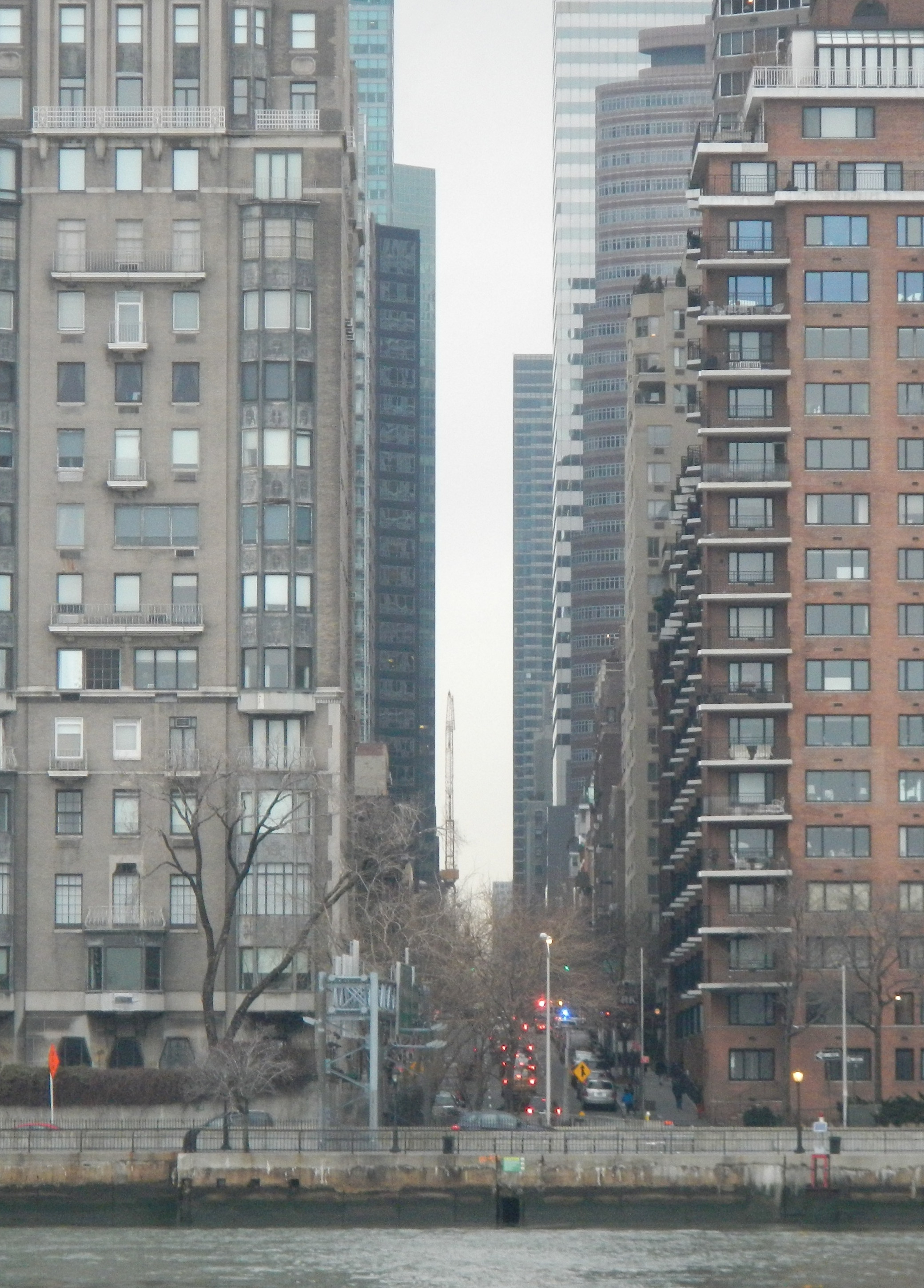
- View of 53rd Street from across the East River
- Interactive map of 53rd Street
- Length: 1.83 mi (2.95 km)
- Location: Midtown Manhattan, New York City
- West end: Eleventh Avenue
- East end: FDR Drive / Sutton Place
- North: 54th Street
- South: 52nd Street

53rd Street is an east–west street in Midtown Manhattan, New York City, which measures 1.83 miles (2.95 km) long. The street runs westbound from Sutton Place across most of the island's width, ending at DeWitt Clinton Park at Eleventh Avenue.

The Lexington Avenue/51st Street station complex, one of the busiest in the New York City Subway system, is accessible from this street, and is served by 6, <6>, E, F, and <F> trains. The Seventh Avenue station, serviced by the B, D, and E trains, is a similarly busy transfer station. The 53rd Street Tunnel carries the IND Queens Boulevard Line (E, F, and <F> trains) of the New York City Subway under the East River between Manhattan and Queens.

== Notable locations, east to west ==
River House, a co-op apartment building is located at 435 East 52nd Street had its rear entrance to 53rd Street. Sutton House, Building C, is located at 420 East 53rd St.

312 and 314 East 53rd Street, east of Second Avenue, are two of a few remaining wooden houses in Midtown and Upper Manhattan.

303 East 53rd Street was Muppet headquarters between 1963 and 1968 when Jim Henson rented space in the building. The gay bar 'Rounds' at this address, part of the gay hustling precinct 'The Loop', was closed by police in August 1994.

The Lipstick Building stands at Third Avenue.

Citigroup Center is a 59-story skyscraper located at 601 Lexington Avenue, at the corner of 53rd Street.

The Seagram Building is a 38-story skyscraper located at 375 Park Avenue, between 52nd Street and 53rd Street, designed by the German architect Ludwig Mies van der Rohe, in collaboration with the American Philip Johnson and completed in 1958. Lever House is a 21-story skyscraper located at 390 Park Avenue, between 54th Street and 53rd Street, designed by Gordon Bunshaft of Skidmore, Owings and Merrill, and completed in 1952.

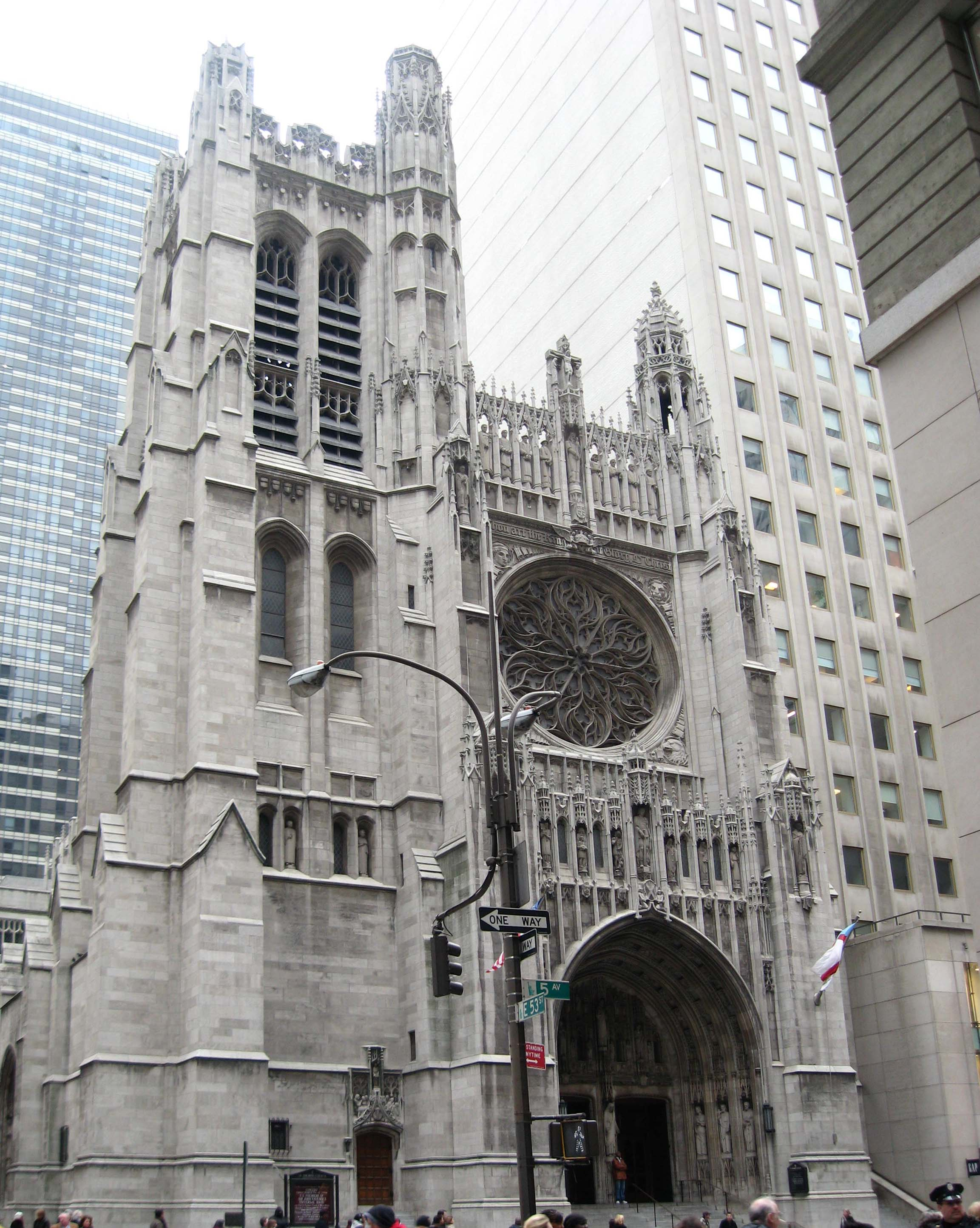
St Thomas Church at Fifth Avenue

12 East 53rd Street, a townhouse used by LIM College and a New York City designated landmark. The Stork Club was one of the more famous nightclubs in New York City during the 1930s–1950s. It was located at 3 East 53rd Street, just off Fifth Avenue. Paley Park, on the former site of the Stork Club, is a 4,200-square-foot (390 m^{2}) pocket park that has been recognized as one of the finest urban spaces in the United States.

Saint Thomas Church is located at Fifth Avenue, on the northwest corner. On the southwest corner is 666 Fifth Avenue.

The block between Fifth and Sixth Avenues also contains the former Donnell Library Center, the Museum of Modern Art, the American Folk Art Museum, and the "Black Rock" and "Brown Rock" (1330 Avenue of the Americas) buildings of CBS and (formerly) ABC, respectively. A skyscraper was topped out in 2018, at 53 West 53rd Street.

The block between Sixth and Seventh Avenues has the Calyon Building and the hotels Hilton New York and Sheraton New York, separated by a subway powerhouse, the Central IND Substation. At the middle of this block, there is a crosswalk as part of a north-south pedestrian avenue named 6½ Avenue.

The Ed Sullivan Theater is at Broadway, across the street from the back door of the Roseland Ballroom and next to another subway powerhouse. The theater is the location for The Late Show with Stephen Colbert. Colbert's predecessor, David Letterman, sometimes used the street for segments of the show.

A section of 53rd at Eighth Avenue was named Jerry Orbach Way in 2007 in honor of the actor, who had lived there for 25 years.

The Wendy Williams Show was taped at 433 West 53rd. Power Station is a recording studio at 441 West 53rd.

A building at 811 Tenth Avenue, between 53rd and 54th Streets, houses the largest New York City exchange of AT&T Long Lines. It extends about halfway to Eleventh Avenue and doesn't have windows; there are only two small rectangular openings located just above the two flagpoles on either side of the front door, giving access to the flags.

The street ends in Hell's Kitchen at DeWitt Clinton Park at Eleventh Avenue.
