= Lord Anthony Crichton-Stuart =

British art historian

- Born: 14 May 1961 (age 65)
- Education: Ampleforth College; St Chad's College
- Spouse: Alison Bruce (m. 1990)
- Children: 3
- Parent(s): John Crichton-Stuart, 6th Marquess of Bute; Beatrice Weld-Forester

Lord Anthony Crichton-Stuart (born 14 May 1961) is a British art historian, and former head of old master paintings at Christie's in New York, where he worked from 1991 until 2006. He is now an independent art dealer in London, specializing in Old Master Paintings.

== Early life ==
He is the younger son of the former Beatrice Nicola Grace Weld-Forester and John Crichton-Stuart, 6th Marquess of Bute; as such, he is styled as a lord. He was also the heir presumptive to his nephew, the 8th Marquess, until 2024. His elder brother was John Crichton-Stuart, 7th Marquess of Bute, a prominent race-car driver.

He is a descendant of Bernard Forbes, 8th Earl of Granard and Beatrice Mills Forbes, an American socialite who was the daughter of Ogden Mills and a descendant of the Livingston and the Schuyler families from New York.

He was educated at Ampleforth College and St Chad's College, Durham University.

== Career ==
Lord Anthony's areas of specialty include Dutch and Flemish 17th-century paintings, and he has been active in the Old Master Paintings market for over forty years, having worked first for the Brod Gallery in London from 1984 to 1986, and then joining the Old Master Paintings department in Christie's London in 1987. In 2004, he and his London counterpart Paul Raison played an instrumental role in the acquisition of the Hall and Knight galleries by Christie's. He has been involved in the rediscovery and sale at auction of works by Joachim Wtewael, Bernardo Bellotto, Carlo Dolci, Lorenzo Baldissera Tiepolo and Ludovico Carracci.

== Personal life ==
In 1990, Lord Anthony married Alison Bruce, a daughter of Keith Bruce of Highgate, London. Together, they have three children; Flora Grace, Eliza Rose and Arthur Alec Crichton-Stuart.

In 1996, Lord Anthony purchased 120 East 92nd Street in New York City.
