= John Crichton-Stuart, 5th Marquess of Bute =

British ornithologist and noble (1907–1956)

The Most Honourable The Marquess of Bute
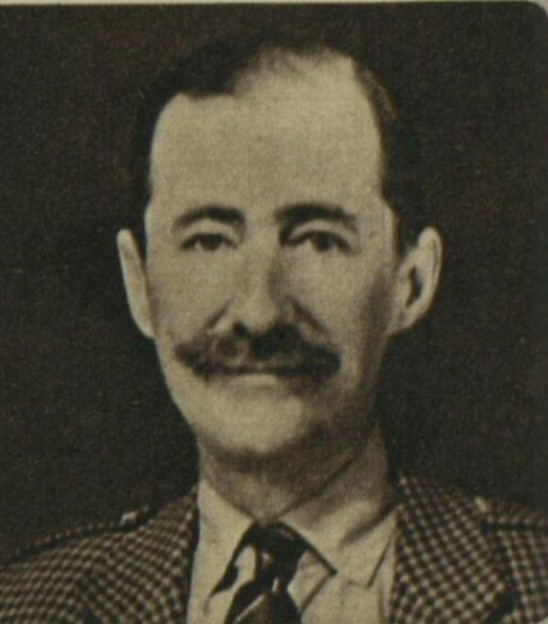

Personal details
- Born: 4 August 1907
- Died: 14 August 1956 (aged 49)
- Spouse: Lady Eileen Forbes (m. 1932)
- Children: John Crichton-Stuart, 6th Marquess of Bute; Lord David Crichton-Stuart; Lord James Crichton-Stuart; Lady Caroline Crichton-Stuart
- Parent(s): John Crichton-Stuart, 4th Marquess of Bute; Augusta Bellingham

John Crichton-Stuart, 5th Marquess of Bute (4 August 1907 – 14 August 1956), son of John Crichton-Stuart, 4th Marquess of Bute, and Augusta Bellingham, was a Scottish peer and landowner.

== Earl of Dumfries ==
On 26 April 1932, as the then Earl of Dumfries, he married Lady Eileen Beatrice Forbes (1912–1993), a daughter of Bernard Forbes, 8th Earl of Granard, by his wife Beatrice Mills, an American socialite who was the daughter of Ogden Mills. They had four children:

1. John Crichton-Stuart, 6th Marquess of Bute (27 February 1933 – 22 July 1993)
2. Lord David Crichton-Stuart (27 February 1933 – 1977)
3. Lord James Crichton-Stuart (17 September 1935 – 5 December 1982). He married and divorced the fashion model Sarah Frances Croker-Poole, who later married the Muslim religious leader Aga Khan IV, converted to Islam, took the name "Salimah Aga Khan" and became the mother of three children by the Aga Khan, including his successor Aga Khan V.
4. Lady Caroline Moira Fiona Crichton-Stuart (born 7 January 1941)

== Marquess of Bute ==
In 1947, the then Earl succeeded his father, becoming the fifth Marquess of Bute and inheriting the expansive Bute Estate. Facing considerable death-duties, the Marquess sold the family's remaining interests in Cardiff and disposed of Cardiff Castle by way of gifting it to the city. Similarly, in 1950, he placed Castell Coch in the care of the Ministry of Works.

The Marquess was an expert ornithologist; in 1931 he bought the islands of St Kilda to preserve them as a bird sanctuary, leaving them to the National Trust for Scotland on his death.

In 1953, the Marchioness of Bute and Lady St David's Fund was set up to encourage and support women to train as nurses and midwives in south Wales.

The Marquess died on 14 August 1956, aged 49, at Mount Stuart House, Isle of Bute, having allegedly been "suffering from a throat complaint".

== See also ==
- Falkland Palace

== Sources ==
- Jenkins, Philip (2002). The Making of a Ruling Class: the Glamorgan Gentry 1640–1790. Cambridge, UK: Cambridge University Press. ISBN 978-0-521-52194-9.
- Jones, Nigel R. (2005). Architecture of England, Scotland and Wales. Westport, US: Greenwood Press. ISBN 978-0-313-31850-4.
- Royal Commission on the Ancient and Historical Monuments of Wales (1991). Glamorgan: Early Castles. Cardiff, UK: Royal Commission on the Ancient and Historical Monuments of Wales. ISBN 9780113000357.

Peerage of Great Britain
Preceded by John Crichton-Stuart	Marquess of Bute; 1947–1956	Succeeded by John Crichton-Stuart
