= John Crichton-Stuart, 4th Marquess of Bute =

British peer, industrial magnate (1881–1947)

The Most Honourable The Marquess of Bute KT
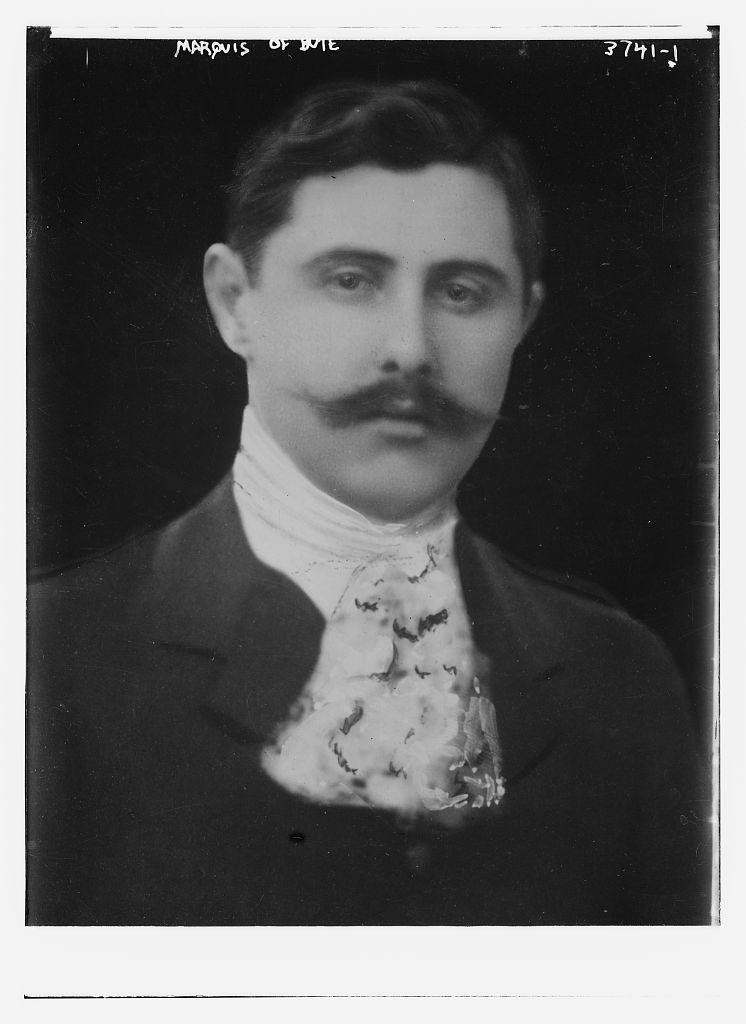
- The 4th Marquess of Bute, c. 1915

Personal details
- Born: 20 June 1881 Chiswick, London, England
- Died: 25 April 1947 (aged 65)
- Spouse: Augusta Bellingham (m. 1905)
- Children: Lady Mary Walker; John Crichton-Stuart, 5th Marquess of Bute; Lady Jean Bertie; Lord Robert Crichton-Stuart; Lord David Crichton-Stuart; Lord Patrick Crichton-Stuart; Lord Rhidian Crichton-Stuart
- Parent(s): John Crichton-Stuart, 3rd Marquess of Bute; Hon. Gwendolen Fitzalan-Howard
- Education: Harrow School

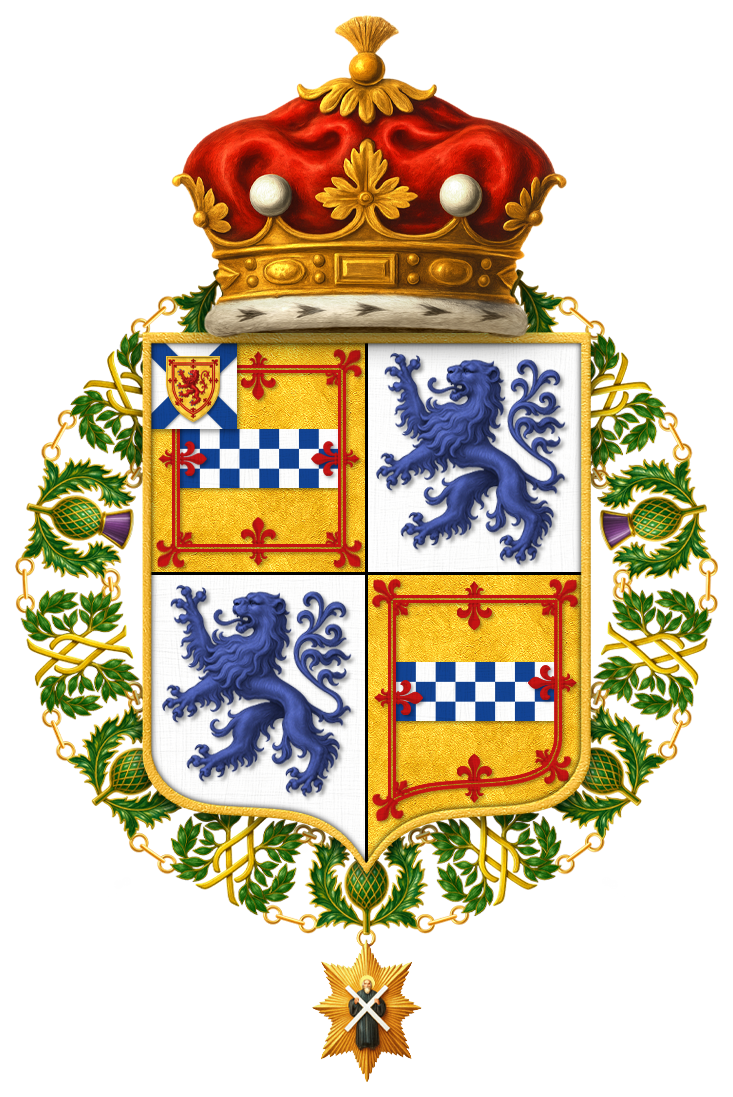
Shield of Arms of John Crichton-Stuart, 4th Marquess of Bute, KT

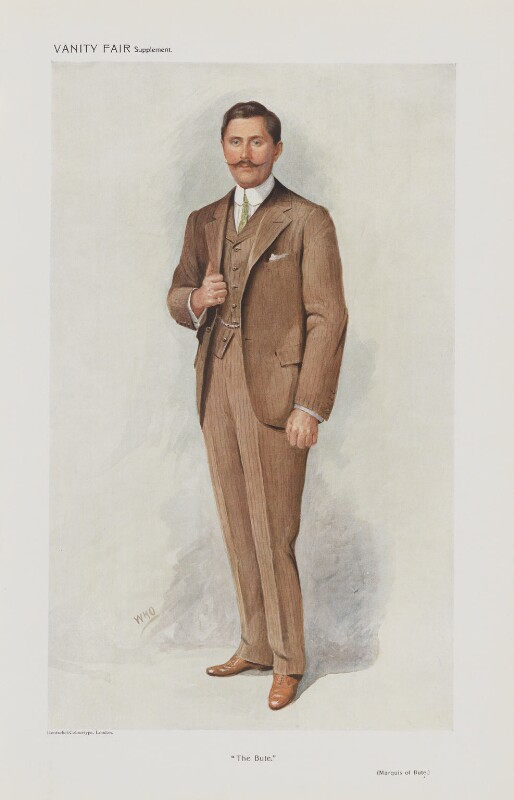
"The Bute", caricature by "WHO" in Vanity Fair, 1910.

John Crichton-Stuart, 4th Marquess of Bute, KT (20 June 1881 – 25 April 1947), was a Scottish peer.

== Biography ==
Bute was born at Chiswick House in Chiswick, London. He was the son of John Crichton-Stuart, 3rd Marquess of Bute and Gwendolen Fitzalan-Howard, a daughter of Edward Fitzalan-Howard, 1st Baron Howard of Glossop and granddaughter of Henry Howard, 13th Duke of Norfolk.

He was educated at Harrow School, and succeeded his father as Marquess of Bute in October 1900, when he was nineteen years old. In early 1902 he was on a tour in the Far East. On reaching his majority in June 1902, he received the Honorary Freedom of the Burgh of Rothesay, and later the same month took the oath and his seat in the House of Lords. The 4th marquess, like his father, was a Knight of the Thistle.

He also had a passion for architecture and was responsible for restoring Caerphilly Castle in South Wales. In 1936 he published a pamphlet entitled "A Plea for Scotland's Architectural Heritage", which argued for the preservation of Scotland's smaller burgh dwellings and advocated reconditioning traditional working class housing, rather than wholesale demolition. He became "the man who sold a city" when, in 1938, he disposed of the remaining Bute family estate in Cardiff.

=== Bute House ===
Between 1903 and 1930, Bute bought and renovated a number of houses, No.s 5, 6, 7 and 8, in Charlotte Square in Edinburgh, making No.5 his townhouse. In 1949 his heir, the 5th marquess, moved his family to No.6 and placed No.5 on loan to the National Trust for Scotland. In 1956, on his death, No.s 5, 6 and 7 were given permanently to the Trust in lieu of death duties. No.6, Bute House, became the official residence of the Secretary of State for Scotland and is now the official residence of the First Minister of Scotland. In the 21st century, revelations by Antony Beevor, in his study of the Spanish Civil War, The Battle for Spain, showed that the 4th Marquess, a Roman Catholic, had donated proceeds from the sale of the estate's properties in Cardiff to help finance the regime change war by General Franco's Nationalist faction. While this was done as a reaction to both the Red Terror and the religious persecution the Second Spanish Republic had unleashed against the Catholic Church in Spain, the revelation caused the 4th Marquess to be posthumously accused of Fascism and led to unsuccessful demands to the National Trust for Scotland for the renaming of Bute House.

== Family life ==
On 6 July 1905, the young Lord Bute married Augusta Bellingham, daughter of Sir (Alan) Henry Bellingham, 4th Baronet, and Catherine Noel. The lavish Roman Catholic Wedding Mass, at Bellingham Castle in the village of Castlebellingham in County Louth, Ireland, was followed by a party at Mount Stuart House in Scotland. A film company was employed to film the event, one of the earliest examples of the aristocratic classes making a private film.

They had seven children:

- Lady Mary Crichton-Stuart (8 May 1906 – 1980); married Edward Walker and had issue.
- John Crichton-Stuart, 5th Marquess of Bute (4 August 1907 – 14 August 1956)
- Lady Jean Crichton-Stuart (28 October 1908 – 23 October 1995); married Lt.-Cmdr. Hon. James Bertie and had issue (two sons); her elder son was Fra' Andrew Willoughby Ninian Bertie, Prince and Grand Master of the Sovereign Military Order of Malta from 1988 until his death in 2008.
- Lord Robert Crichton-Stuart (12 December 1909 – 26 June 1976); married Lady Janet Egida Montgomerie (1911–1999), daughter of Archibald Montgomerie, 16th Earl of Eglinton and had issue. Lord Robert bought Cornwell Manor in Oxfordshire after World War II, and lived there until 1959.
- Lord David Crichton-Stuart (8 February 1911 – 3 March 1970); married Ursula Packe and had issue.
- Lord Patrick Crichton-Stuart (1 February 1913 – 5 February 1956); married Jane von Bahr and had issue.
- Captain Lord Rhidian Crichton-Stuart (4 June 1917 – 25 June 1969); married Selina Gerth van Wijk and had issue.

== Ancestry ==
Ancestors of John Crichton-Stuart, 4th Marquess of Bute

16. John Stuart, 1st Marquess of Bute
8. John Stuart, Lord Mount Stuart
17. Charlotte Hickman-Windsor
4. John Crichton-Stuart, 2nd Marquess of Bute
18. Patrick McDouall-Crichton, 6th Earl of Dumfries
9. Lady Elizabeth McDouall-Crichton
19. Margaret Crauford
2. John Crichton-Stuart, 3rd Marquess of Bute
20. John Rawdon, 1st Earl of Moira
10. Francis Rawdon-Hastings, 1st Marquess of Hastings
21. Elizabeth Rawdon, Countess of Moira
5. Lady Sophia Rawdon-Hastings
22. James Mure-Campbell, 5th Earl of Loudoun
11. Flora Campbell, 6th Countess of Loudoun
23. Flora Macleod
1. John Crichton-Stuart, 4th Marquess of Bute
24. Bernard Edward Howard, 12th Duke of Norfolk
12. Henry Howard, 13th Duke of Norfolk
25. Lady Elizabeth Belasyse
6. Edward Fitzalan-Howard, 1st Baron Howard of Glossop
26. George Leveson-Gower, 1st Duke of Sutherland
13. Lady Charlotte Sophia Leveson-Gower
27. Elizabeth Sutherland, 19th Countess of Sutherland
3. Gwendolen Fitzalan-Howard
28. John Joseph Talbot
14. George Henry Talbot
29. Susan Harriet Anne Bedingfeld
7. Augusta Talbot
30. Sir Horace David Cholwell St. Paul, 1st Baronet of St. Paul
15. Augusta Jones
31. Ann Isaacson

== Sources ==
- Beevor, Antony (2006) [1982]. The Battle for Spain: The Spanish Civil War 1936–1939. London: Weidenfeld & Nicolson. ISBN 0297848321.
- Burnet (2017). Bute House (PDF). Edinburgh: National Trust for Scotland.
- Glendinning, Miles; MacInnes, Ranald; MacKechnie, Aonghus (1996). A History of Scottish Architecture: From the Renaissance to the Present Day. Edinburgh: Edinburgh University Press. ISBN 0-7486-0741-2.

Honorary titles
Preceded by The Viscount Dunedin	Lord Lieutenant of Buteshire; 1905–1920	Succeeded by Marquess of Graham
Peerage of Great Britain
Preceded by John Crichton-Stuart	Marquess of Bute; 1900–1947	Succeeded by John Crichton-Stuart
