= Paul Raison (art historian) =

Art historian

Paul Raison is a specialist in Old Master paintings. He was for many years a chairman of the auction house Christie's.

== Early life and education ==
The grandson of English cricketer and New Scientist founder Max Raison, and the son of Thatcher-era Government minister The Right Hon. Sir Timothy Raison, Paul Raison was educated at Eton College and Peterhouse, Cambridge, where he took an M.A. Honours degree in French, Italian and the History of Art.

== Career ==
Raison joined Christie’s in 1987 as a graduate trainee in the Chinese, Silver and Old Masters departments. In 1988 he attained the rank of Specialist in the Old Masters Department, then under the leadership of Rubens expert Gregory Martin. Raison became Head of the Old Masters Department in Paris in 1993 and was based in France until 1996, when he moved back to the UK to assume the same role at Christie's London. In 2004, he and his New York counterpart Anthony Crichton-Stuart played an instrumental role in the acquisition of the Hall and Knight galleries by Christie's. Raison was appointed Deputy Chairman of Christie's in 2012, and International Co-Chairman in 2016.

Raison led the sale of Old Master Pictures in London in December 2000, which realised a total of £56.7 million, "the highest for a sale in this category at the time". In 2004, he led the private treaty sale of Duccio’s Stroganoff Madonna to the Metropolitan Museum of Art in New York City for a record sum, then the highest price ever paid by the Met for any purchase, the second highest price ever paid for an Old Master privately and the most expensive Old Master ever sold by Christie's, breaking the record held since 1989 by the Pontormo Halberdier. He oversaw the Old Masters auction in December 2009, which realised £68.4 million, establishing a new highest total for a sale of Old Masters and setting artist records for Rembrandt, Raphael and Domenichino. In July 2016, Raison was responsible for the rediscovery, attribution and sale of Rubens’s Lot and his Daughters, The Rubens is now on loan to the Metropolitan Museum of Art.

Raison has advised collectors and institutions in Europe, North and South America, South Africa, the Middle East and Asia. He is known for his expertise in French and Spanish art and collections, where his activity has included, respectively, the discovery of a lifetime portrait of Anton Fugger, acquired in 2002 by the Louvre, and of an early work by El Greco, acquired from Christie's by the Historical Museum of Crete in the artist's birthplace of Heraklion, still one of the only autograph works by El Greco in any public or private collection in Greece. He regularly lectures on Old Masters in Asia. In 2020, Raison left Christie's to set up his own consultancy.
