= Registered historic parks and gardens in Cardiff =

List of landscapes in county of Wales

Cardiff shown within Wales

The City and County of Cardiff is a county in the south of Wales. It covers an area of 140.3 km^{2} (54.2 sq mi) and in 2023 the population was approximately 359,512. Cardiff is the country's capital and hosts its parliament, the Senedd, and a large number of national institutions such as the Wales Millennium Centre, the National Museum, the national stadium of Wales and the St Fagans National Museum of History.

The Cadw/ICOMOS Register of Parks and Gardens of Special Historic Interest in Wales was established in 2002 and given statutory status in 2022. It is administered by Cadw, the historic environment agency of the Welsh Government. It includes just under 400 sites, ranging from gardens of private houses, to cemeteries and public parks. Parks and gardens are listed at one of three grades, matching the grading system used for listed buildings. Grade I is the highest grade, for sites of exceptional interest; Grade II*, the next highest, denotes parks and gardens of more than special interest; while Grade II denotes nationally important sites of special interest.

There are 18 registered parks and gardens in Cardiff. Three are listed at grade I, five at II*, and ten at grade II. Sophia Gardens, Cathays Park, and Bute Park and the grounds of Cardiff Castle originally formed the castle estate. Pontcanna and Llandaff Fields run north from the centre, forming a very large public park. There are five smaller urban parks, six gardens to formerly private houses, the grounds of a hospital and a cemetery. A large number of the registered parks were designed by Andrew Pettigrew and his sons. Pettigrew came to Cardiff from his native Scotland in 1873, as head gardener to John Crichton-Stuart, 3rd Marquess of Bute. Over the following 60 years, he and his sons worked on most of the city's major parks; the Glamorgan Archives, which hold the records of Cardiff County Borough Council containing materials relating to the development of the city's parks, describes them collectively as "the family who landscaped Cardiff".

== List of parks and gardens ==
Grade	Criteria
I	Parks and gardens of exceptional interest
II*	Particularly important parks and gardens of more than special interest
II	Parks and gardens of national importance and special interest

List of parks and gardens
Name	Location Grid Ref. (Note: Sometimes known as OSGB36, the grid reference is based on the British national grid reference system used by the Ordnance Survey.) Geo-coordinates	Date Listed	Site type	Description / Notes	Grade	Reference Number	Image
Cardiff Castle and Bute Park	Cardiff; ST 17594 77252; 51°29′17″N 3°11′18″W	1 February 2022	Park	The grounds of Cardiff Castle were landscaped in the mid-18th century by Capability Brown. In the 19th century, John Crichton-Stuart, 3rd Marquess of Bute engaged Andrew Pettigrew to landscape Bute Park which was connected to the castle by a Swiss Bridge (no longer extant) designed by William Burges. (Note: The West Lodge entrance to Bute Park, designed by Alexander Roos, houses a cafe, the Pettigrew Tea Rooms, named in Andrew Pettigrew's honour.) Burges also designed the Animal Wall which forms the park's southern boundary.	I	PGW(Gm)22(CDF)	Cardiff Castle and Bute Park
Cathays Cemetery	Cathays; ST 18129 78885; 51°30′11″N 3°10′51″W	1 February 2022	Cemetery	The cemetery opened in 1859 and covers 110 acres making it the third largest in the United Kingdom. It was multi-denominational from the outset, with separate sections for Anglicans, Dissenters and Roman Catholics. It has long been a place of burial for the notables of Cardiff.	II*	PGW(Gm)19(CDF)	Cathays Cemetery
Cathays Park	Cardiff; ST1805077119; 51°29′12″N 3°10′49″W	1 February 2022	Park	Cathays Park forms "the finest civic centre in the British Isles". Laid out in the early 20th century, following Cardiff's being made a city in 1905, it houses the law courts, the city hall, the national museum, the city's main police station and the Welsh Office. It is also the location of the Welsh National War Memorial. The site includes Alexandra Gardens, Gorsedd Gardens and the Friary Garden.	II	PGW(Gm)26(CDF)	Cathays Park
Coryton House	Coryton; ST1442581265; 51°31′24″N 3°14′01″W	1 February 2022	Garden	John Cory, founder of the shipping firm, John Cory & Sons, built Coryton House in 1900. His son, Sir James Herbert Cory, served as High Sheriff of Glamorgan, MP for two Cardiff constituencies, and was made a baronet. He expanded the gardens in the early 20th century. The house is now a special school.	II	PGW(Gm)67(CDF)	
Craig-y-parc House	Pentyrch; ST 09606 80838; 51°31′09″N 3°18′15″W	1 February 2022	Garden	The house and gardens were designed by Charles Edward Mallows for Thomas Evans, a mine owner, and constructed between 1914 and 1918. The architectural historian John Newman, in his Glamorgan volume of the Buildings of Wales, notes the strong influence of Lutyens. The garden contains a number of listed buildings, including a loggia, terracing, steps and lodges.	II*	PGW(Gm)6(CDF)	Craig-y-parc House
Grange Gardens	Grangetown; ST 17962 74895; 51°28′01″N 3°10′57″W	1 February 2022	Urban park	A small urban park to the south-west of the city centre, Grange Gardens was constructed between 1891-1895. It contains a war memorial, a fountain, a listed shelter built of tree trunks, and the city's first bandstand.	II	PGW(Gm)72(CDF)	Grange Gardens
Insole Court	Llandaff; ST1487077984; 51°29′38″N 3°13′35″W	1 February 2022	Garden	The gardens were developed from the mid-19th century by James Harvey Insole, whose father, George had made a fortune in mining and shipping. They include extensive rockwork, constructed partly of natural stone and partly of Pulhamite, which housed an important collection of Alpine plants and irises assembled by Violet Insole. The gardens and house are managed by a charitable trust.	II*	PGW(Gm)27(CDF)	Insole Court
Parc Cefn Onn	Lisvane; ST 17747 84113; 51°33′00″N 3°11′16″W	1 February 2022	Garden	Ernest Albert Prosser, manager of the Taff Vale Railway laid out the gardens in the early 20th century, working with his head gardener, Tom Jenkins who managed the gardens from 1911 until after 1944, when they came into the ownership of Cardiff City Council. A traditional woodland garden, Cefn Onn has collections of conifers and rhododendra, planted around streams and pools. The small estate has no house; the death of Prosser's son Cecil from tuberculosis at 26, saw Prosser abandon his plans to build one. The park has views over the city to the south, and to Caerphilly Mountain to the north.	II	PGW(Gm)20(CDF)	Parc Cefn Onn
Pontcanna Fields and Llandaff Fields	Cardiff; ST1618377595; 51°29′26″N 3°12′27″W	1 February 2022	Park	Pontcanna and Llandaff Fields run north from Sophia Gardens and Bute Park to the east of Llandaff, forming a very large open public park in the centre of the city. They were developed as public space from the mid-19th century. From the 1890s, development of the fields was led by William Wallace Pettigrew, who became Cardiff's first parks superintendent after the incorporation of the city, and worked on many of its most important parks. (Note: William Wallace Pettigrew was the son of Andrew Pettigrew, head gardener to John Crichton-Stuart, 3rd Marquess of Bute and the designer of Bute park. William was succeeded in his role as Cardiff's parks superintendent by his brother, Andrew Alexander, when William took up the post of Chief Parks Officer at Manchester in 1915. He returned to the role on his brother's premature death in 1932.) Pontcanna has a noted avenue of lime trees.	II*	PGW(Gm)59(CDF)	Pontcanna Fields and Llandaff Fields
Roath Park	Roath; ST1845379315; 51°30′23″N 3°10′30″W	1 February 2022	Urban park	Cardiff's first publicly-owned park, Roath was designed by William Wallace Pettigrew in association with William Harpur, the borough engineer, and opened in 1894. The park is centred on a large lake, used for boating, and the site of a clock lighthouse, the Scott Memorial, which commemorates Robert Falcon Scott and the Terra Nova Expedition, which sailed to Antarctica from Cardiff Docks in June 1910. The park retains much of its late-Victorian structure and planting.	I	PGW(Gm)24(CDF)	Roath Park
Rookwood Hospital	Llandaff; ST1488678045; 51°29′40″N 3°13′34″W	1 February 2022	Garden	The gardens may have 18th-century origins, but were extensively developed from the 1860s by Colonel Sir Edward Stock Hill, a shipping owner with interests in Cardiff and Bristol. From 1918, the house served as a hospital until its closure in 2020. The gardens have a large number of specimen trees and the ruins of a summer house.	II	PGW(Gm)28(CDF)	Rookwood Hospital
Sophia Gardens	Cardiff; ST1737176971; 51°29′07″N 3°11′25″W	1 February 2022	Park	The park was opened to the people of Cardiff by Sophia Crichton-Stuart, Marchioness of Bute in 1858 to compensate for the ending of public access to the grounds of Cardiff Castle. In the 20th and 21st centuries, the park has largely been given over to sporting facilities, including the Sport Wales National Centre and the Cardiff Wales Cricket Stadium.	II	PGW(Gm)21(CDF)	Sophia Gardens
St Fagans Castle	St Fagans; ST 12074 77090; 51°29′09″N 3°16′04″W	1 February 2022	Garden	The high listing accorded to the castle grounds reflects its status as "one of the most important historic gardens in Wales". With Tudor origins, the grounds were developed by the Earls of Plymouth, local landowners, in the 19th and 20th centuries, and comprise a series of Italianate terraces running down to the River Ely and compartmentalised sections, such as the Dutch, Herb and Knot gardens. The St Fagans National Museum of History is located on the wider estate. Work on the gardens was undertaken by Hugh Allan Pettigrew, who served as head gardener from 1900 until 1935, and Andrew Alexander Pettigrew who worked with his brother at St Fagans in the 1890s. They were, respectively, the second and third sons of Andrew Pettigrew.	I	PGW(Gm)31(CDF)	St Fagans Castle
Thompson's Park (Sir David's Field)	Canton; ST 16150 77043; 51°29′10″N 3°12′32″W	1 February 2022	Urban park	Designed by the prolific late-Victorian landscape designer William Goldring, for Charles Thompson, of the Spillers flour and pet food manufacturers, the park passed into public ownership in 1912. It contains a sculpture, Joyance, by William Goscombe John.	II	PGW(Gm)71(CDF)	Thompson's Park (Sir David's Field)
Ty Gwyn	Lisvane; ST1877882854; 51°32′18″N 3°10′16″W	1 February 2022	Garden	Home to three prominent Cardiff businessmen, Ty Gwyn was built by James Edward Turner (1861-1936), a successful contractor whose firm constructed many of Cardiff's major buildings including the City Hall. On Turner’s death, the house was sold to a member of the Reardon Smith shipping family, and in the 1960s to Julian Hodge, the financier. The grounds remain a "well-preserved grand 20th century garden".	II*	PGW(Gm)76(CDF)	Ty Gwyn
Victoria Park	Canton; ST 15454 76932; 51°29′06″N 3°13′08″W	1 February 2022	Urban park	A small urban park, it opened in 1897, the year of Queen Victoria's Diamond Jubilee. The park contained a zoo (now longer extant), populated by specimens brought back to Cardiff Docks by returning sailors and fishermen. Its most famous inhabitant was Billy the Seal, caught in 1912 and resident in the park until its death in 1939. The seal, who is reputed to have swum down Cowbridge Road East and attempted to board a tram during flooding of the River Taff, is commemorated by a statue in the park, and in the song, "Billy the Seal", by the Welsh folk group, The Hennessys.	II	PGW(Gm)23(CDF)	Victoria Park
Waterloo Gardens, Roath Mill Gardens and Roath Brook Gardens	Roath; ST 19752 77963; 51°29′42″N 3°09′26″W	1 February 2022	Urban park	A series of three public parks, running south of Roath Park, and designed in 1909-1910 by William Wallace Pettigrew on land donated by Godfrey Morgan, 1st Viscount Tredegar. Waterloo Gardens retains its original park keeper's shelter, to a similar design to that in Grange Gardens.	II	PGW(Gm)29(CDF)	Waterloo Gardens, Roath Mill Gardens and Roath Brook Gardens
Whitchurch Hospital	Whitchurch; ST1453580544; 51°31′01″N 3°13′55″W	1 February 2022	Garden	A rare example of a landscape specifically designed for a hospital, the estate formed the grounds of the Cardiff Asylum which opened in 1908. William Wallace Pettigrew was involved in the landscaping. Features included a sports field, a bowling green, and lawns with six small garden shelters. The hospital, which is also listed, closed in 2016 and, as at 2021, was in a state of such dereliction that the Victorian Society placed it on their "At-Risk" register. The site's future continues to be controversial.	II	PGW(Gm)66(CDF)	Whitchurch Hospital

== See also ==
- List of scheduled monuments in Cardiff
- Grade I listed buildings in Cardiff
- Grade II* listed buildings in Cardiff

== Sources ==
- Crook, J. Mordaunt (2013). William Burges and the High Victorian Dream. London, UK: Frances Lincoln. ISBN 978-0-7112-3349-2. OCLC 788236063.
- Hilling, John B. (2016). The History and Architecture of Cardiff Civic Centre: Black Gold, White City. Cardiff: University of Wales Press. ISBN 978-1-78316-842-2. OCLC 956622915.
- Newman, John (1995). Glamorgan. The Buildings of Wales. London: Penguin Books. ISBN 978-0-140-71056-4. OCLC 1243807469.
