= Andrew Pettigrew (landscape gardener) =

Scottish landscape gardener (1833 – 1903)

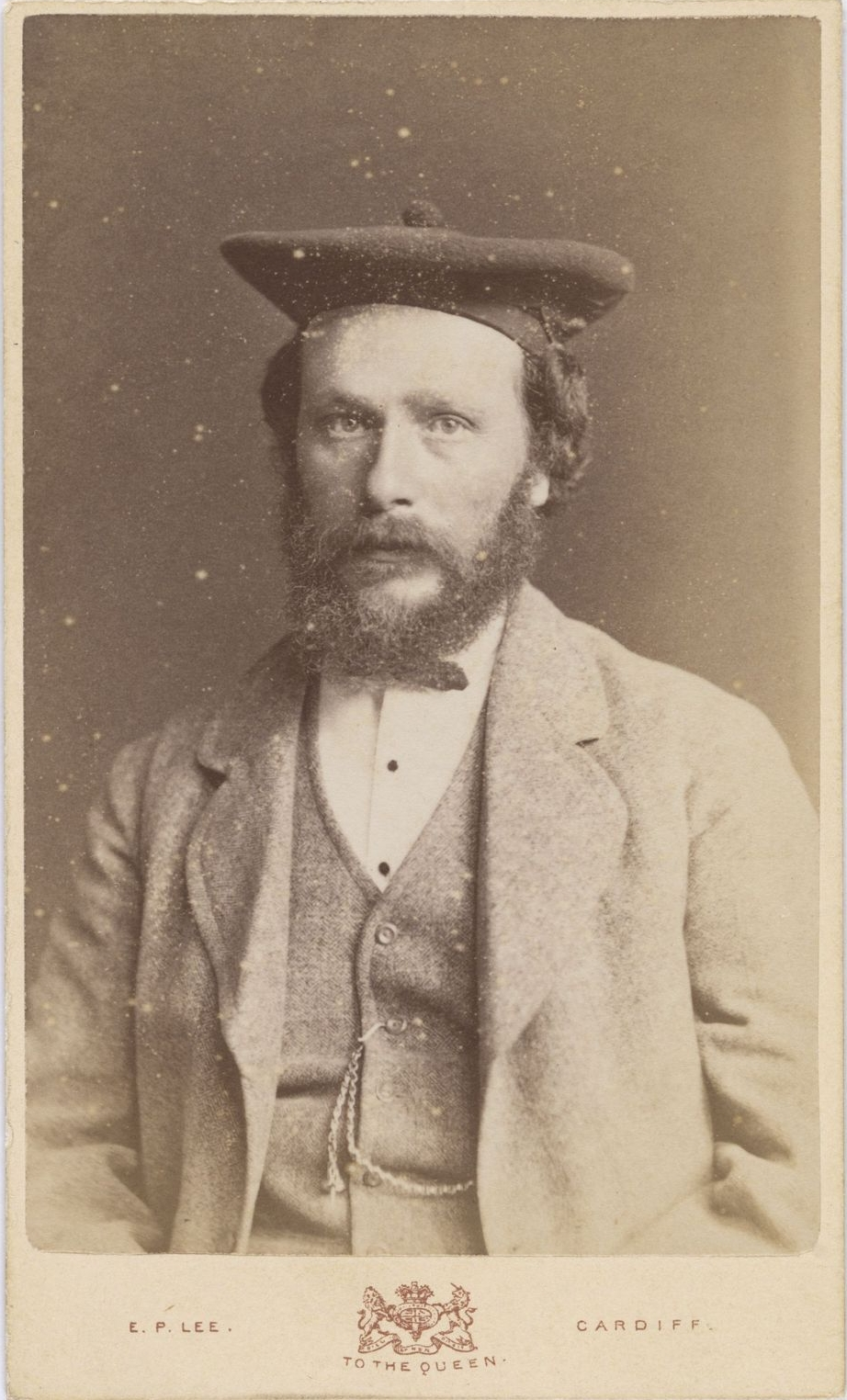
- Carte-de-visite, c. 1876
- Born: 1833
- Died: 1903 (aged 69–70)
- Resting place: Cathays Cemetery, Cardiff
- Occupation: gardener
- Projects: Bute Park, Llandaff and Pontcanna Fields, Roath Park, Cathays Park

Andrew Pettigrew (11 August 1833 – 26 April 1903) was a Scottish landscape gardener. Much of his career was spent as head gardener to John Crichton-Stuart, 3rd Marquess of Bute, firstly at Dumfries House and then at Bute's Welsh estate centred on Cardiff Castle. His three sons, William Wallace, Hugh Allan and Andrew Alexander, also became landscape gardeners, with William and Andrew both serving as the city's superintendent of parks. Collectively they created many of Cardiff's most notable parks, including Bute Park, Cathays Park, Llandaff and Pontcanna Fields, and Roath Park. The Glamorgan Archives, which holds the records of Cardiff County Borough Council containing materials relating to the development of the city's parks, describes them as "the family who landscaped Cardiff".

== Life and career ==
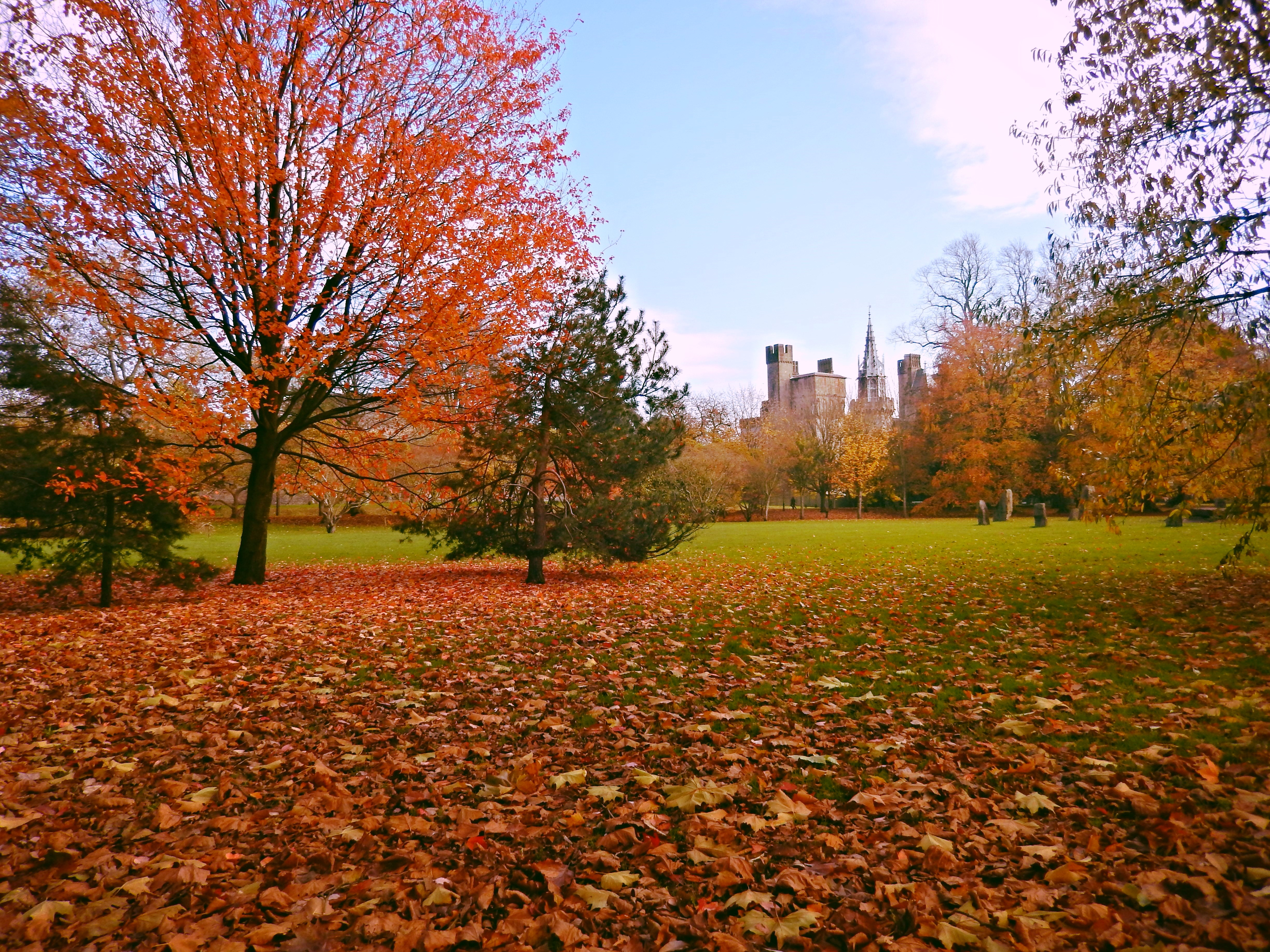
Bute Park with the silhouette of Cardiff Castle

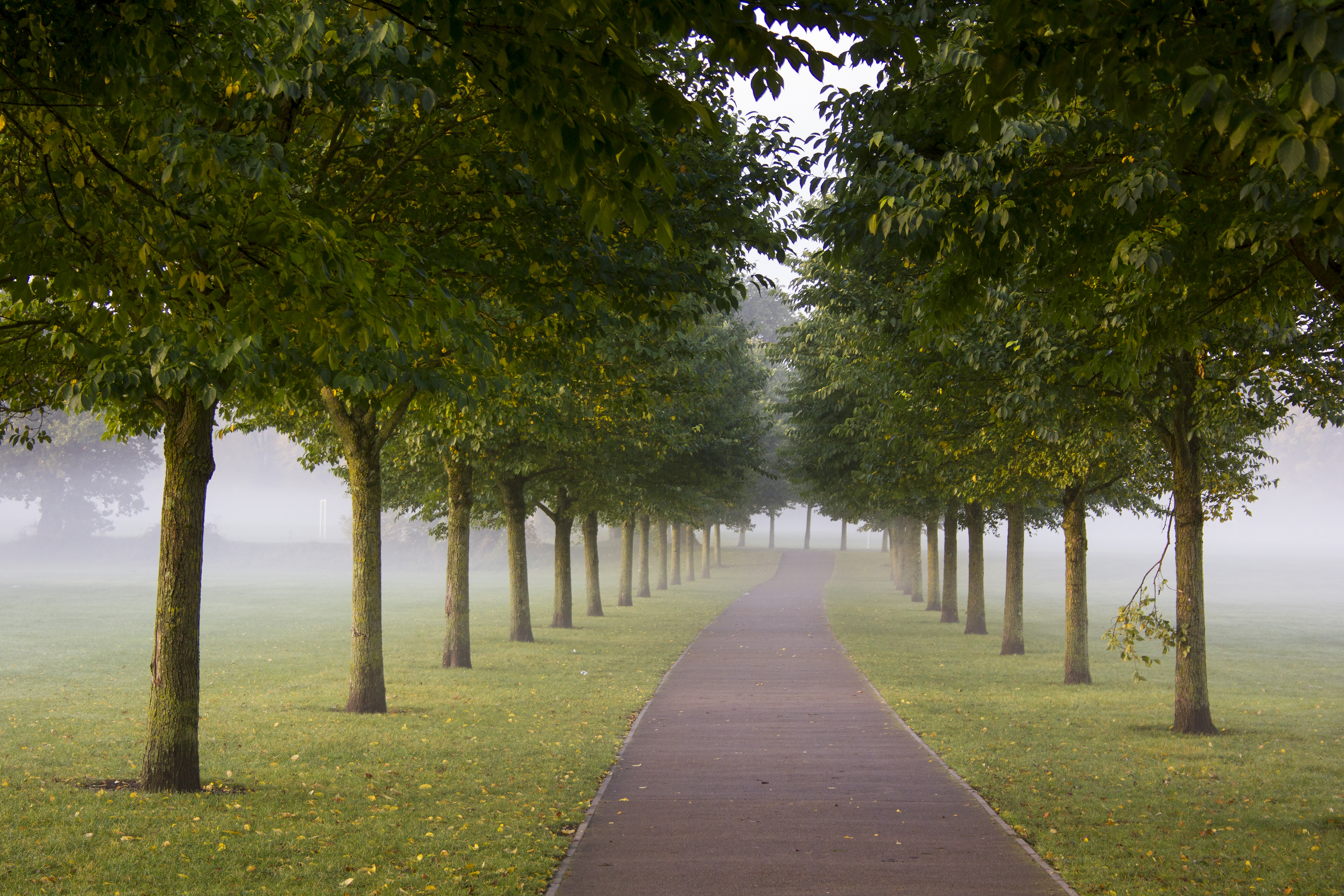
Avenue of limes and elms in Pontcanna Fields

Pettigrew was born in Ayrshire, Scotland in 1833 to shoemaker William and Elizabeth née Kennedy. In 1866 he was engaged by John Crichton-Stuart, 3rd Marquess of Bute, beginning a collaboration that lasted until Bute's death in 1900. Pettigrew began working at Dumfries House in Ayrshire, before transferring to the Bute estate in South Wales in 1873. (Note: The Bute's landholdings in South Wales had been acquired by marriage and were developed by Bute's father, John the second Marquess, who built Cardiff Docks which allowed the exploitation of the major mineral resources on Bute lands in the South Wales Valleys.) In 1865 Bute had met the architect William Burges and the pair began a partnership which transformed Cardiff Castle, Bute's base in the city, into "the skyline of the capital of Wales. The dream of one great patron and one great architect [became] the symbol of a whole nation". Pettigrew was closely involved with this work, laying out Bute Park which became the private park of the castle, to which it was connected by a Swiss Bridge. Cadw, in its listing record for the park, describes Pettigrew as "one of the most important park designers of the second half of the nineteenth century".

In an innovative step, Bute determined to introduce commercial grape vines at Castell Coch in 1873. He sent Pettigrew to France to study vineyards there and together they planted a 1.2-hectare (3-acre) vineyard below the castle. By 1887, the output was 3,000 bottles of sweet white wine of reasonable quality. (Note: The quality of the wines produced was not universally appreciated. Punch magazine covered Bute and Pettigrew's efforts, claiming that the wine produced was so unpleasant "it would take four men to drink it—two to hold the victim and one to pour the wine down his throat".) In 2024, a ten-year tree planting project, Coed Caerdydd, saw the reintroduction of a variety of fruit trees originally introduced by Pettigrew into the Cardiff landscape. Species included the Gabalfa Apple, which was previously thought to have been extinct.

Pettigrew also undertook work at Sophia Gardens, at Roath Park, and on Pontcanna Fields and at Cathays Park, then both part of the castle's private grounds. In these two spaces, he planted wide avenues of lime and elm trees, which survive. His son, Andrew Alexander, wrote of Bute's last visit to Cardiff, shortly before his death in 1900 when the Cathays site had just been sold to Cardiff Corporation for development as the city's civic centre. Walking in the park with Pettigrew, Bute commented on the avenues of trees; "There, Pettigrew, there’s something that will stand as our monument, yours and mine for many generations after we have departed”. Pettigrew is also commemorated at the West Lodge, the southern entrance to Bute Park designed by Alexander Roos, where the cafe is named the Pettigrew Tea Rooms in his honour. Another modern tribute is contained in the People's Door entrance to the park. Created in 2011 by the architect Michael Davies, the door includes nine panels featuring people, events and structures related to the area. Pettigrew is celebrated by a portrait in the panel in the top-right corner. Another panel depicts the demolished Swiss Bridge. The Glamorgan Archives, holders of the records of Cardiff County Borough Council which has materials relating to the development of the city's parks, describes Pettigrew and his sons as "the family who landscaped Cardiff".

== Sons ==
=== William Wallace Pettigrew (1867–1947) ===
Andrew's eldest son, William Wallace, was born at Dumfries House in 1867. He trained under his father and at Kew Gardens. He became the head gardener to Cardiff Corporation in 1891 and became the city's first superintendent of parks on Cardiff's incorporation in 1905. During this time he worked on Roath Park, Llandaff and Pontcanna Fields, and was closely involved with the city's chief engineer, William Harpur in the development of Cathays Park, as the city's civic centre. He was succeeded in this role by his brother, Andrew Alexander, when he took up the post of Chief Parks Officer at Manchester in 1915. While at Manchester, he undertook an important study on the impact of air pollution on city-centre parks, focussing on Philips Park, located in the most-polluted part of the city. He returned to the Cardiff role on Andrew's premature death in 1932. During his retirement he wrote an influential book on the management of public spaces, Municipal parks: layout, management and administration, together with a short treatise on the organisation of a public parks department, which he dedicated to Andrew Alexander. On his second retirement, he returned to Worthing on the Sussex coast, where he died in 1947.

=== Hugh Allan Pettigrew (1871–1947) ===
Trained, like his brothers, under his father and at Kew Gardens, Hugh became head gardener to Robert Windsor-Clive, 1st Earl of Plymouth at Hewell Grange, Worcestershire in 1897. He subsequently transferred to the earl's South Wales estate, St Fagans Castle when he remained until his retirement in 1935. His later years were marred by alcoholism and his retirement was prompted by a dispute with the earl. He moved to Nice dying in 1947, following a collision with a police car.

=== Andrew Alexander Pettigrew (1875–1936) ===
The youngest son, Andrew Alexander trained with his father, during which time he travelled to China and Japan to study horticulture and flora, and at Kew. He worked with his brother Hugh at St Fagans, before succeeding to the post of head gardener to Lord Plymouth at Hewell Grange, where he remained from 1900 to 1915. He then returned to Cardiff to take up the Chief Parks Officer role vacated by his eldest brother William and continued in this post until his death from cancer in 1936. During his tenure, he wrote a seven-volume study, The Public Parks and Recreation Grounds of Cardiff. The work was never published, but is held in the Cardiff City archives and is an important source on the history of Cardiff's parks.

== Gallery ==
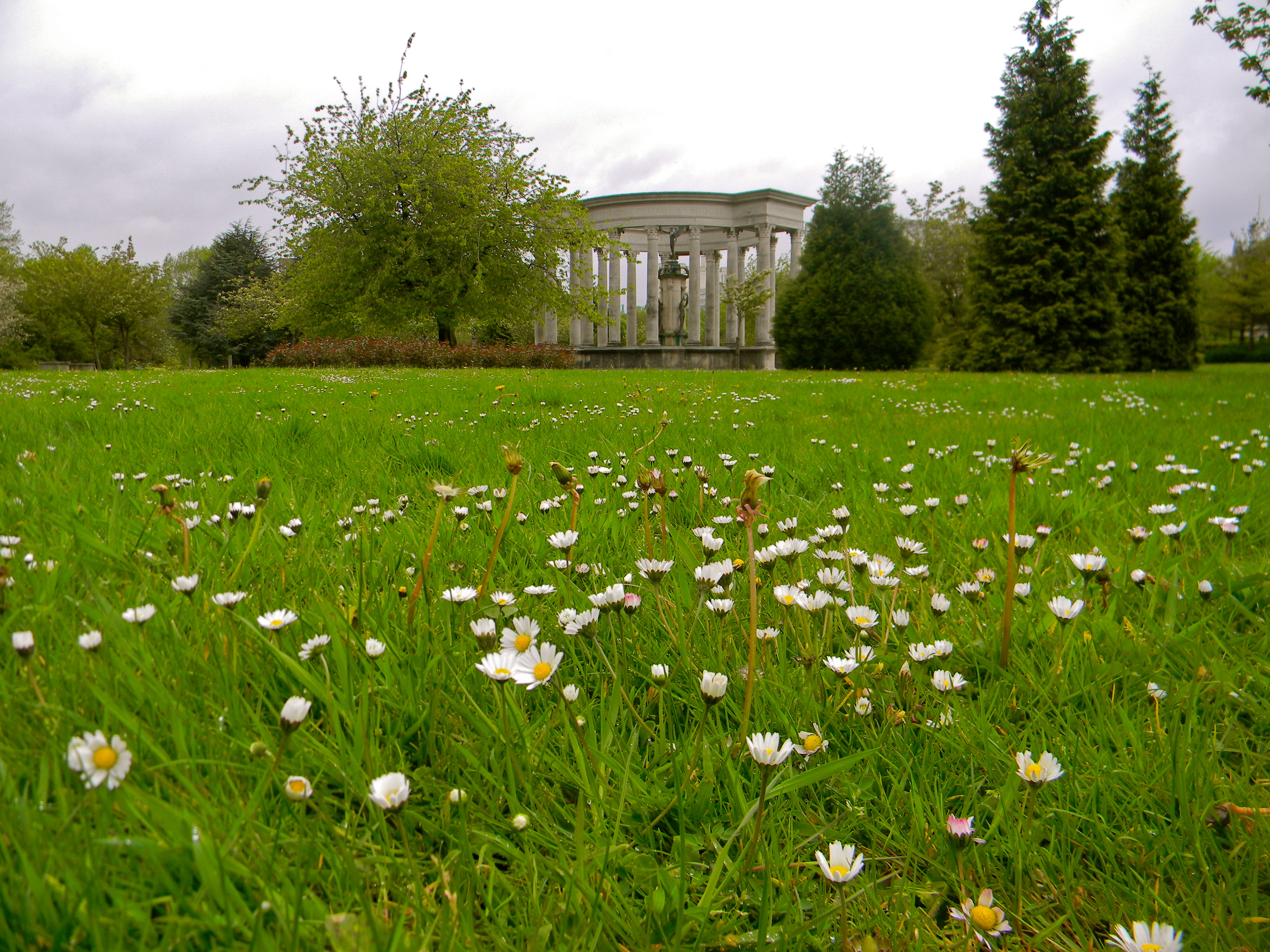
Cathays Park – "the finest civic centre in the British Isles", the landscaping was begun by Andrew Pettigrew and developed by William Wallace

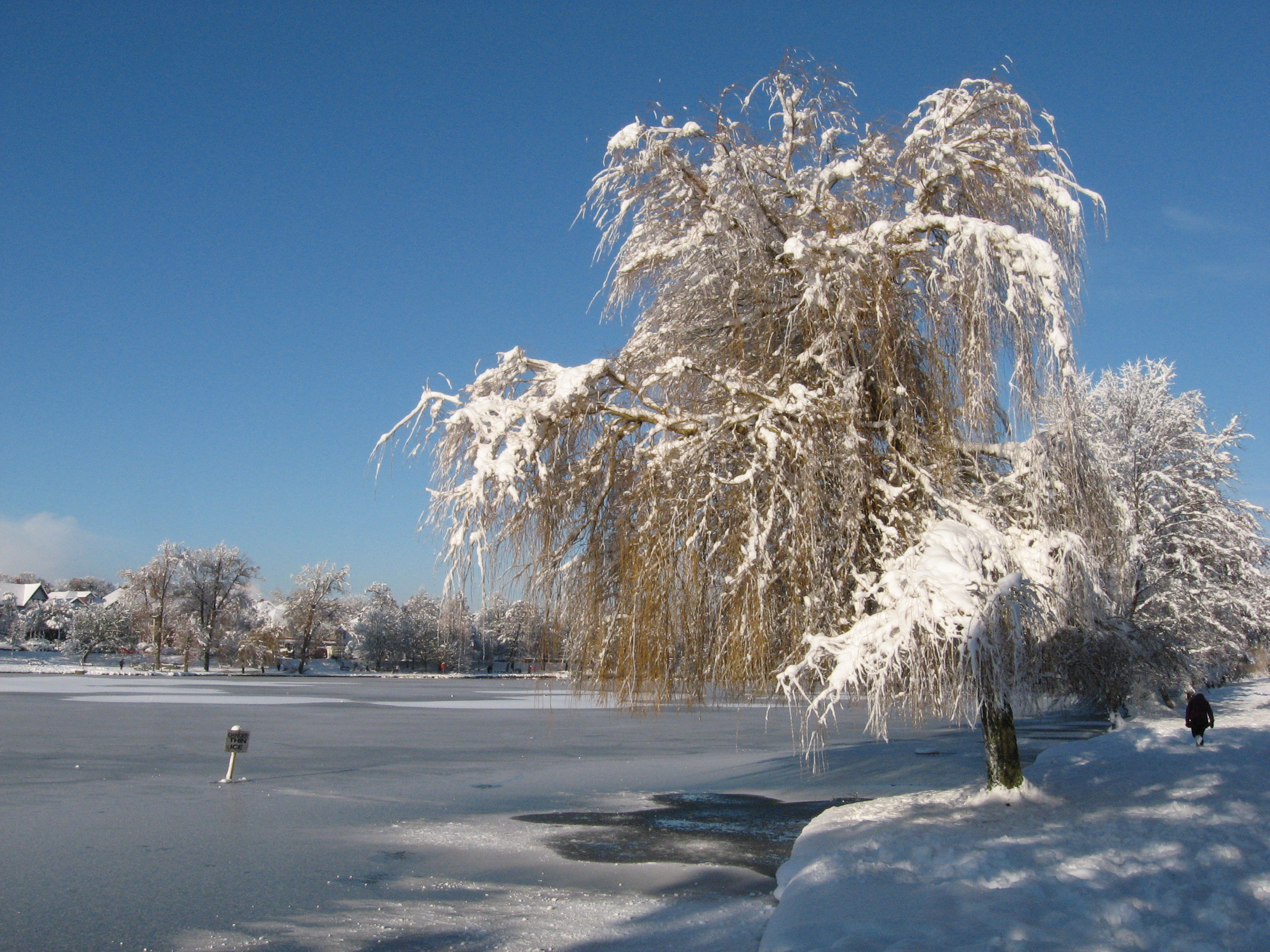
Roath Park lake – the park was another father/son collaboration between Andrew Pettigrew and William Wallace

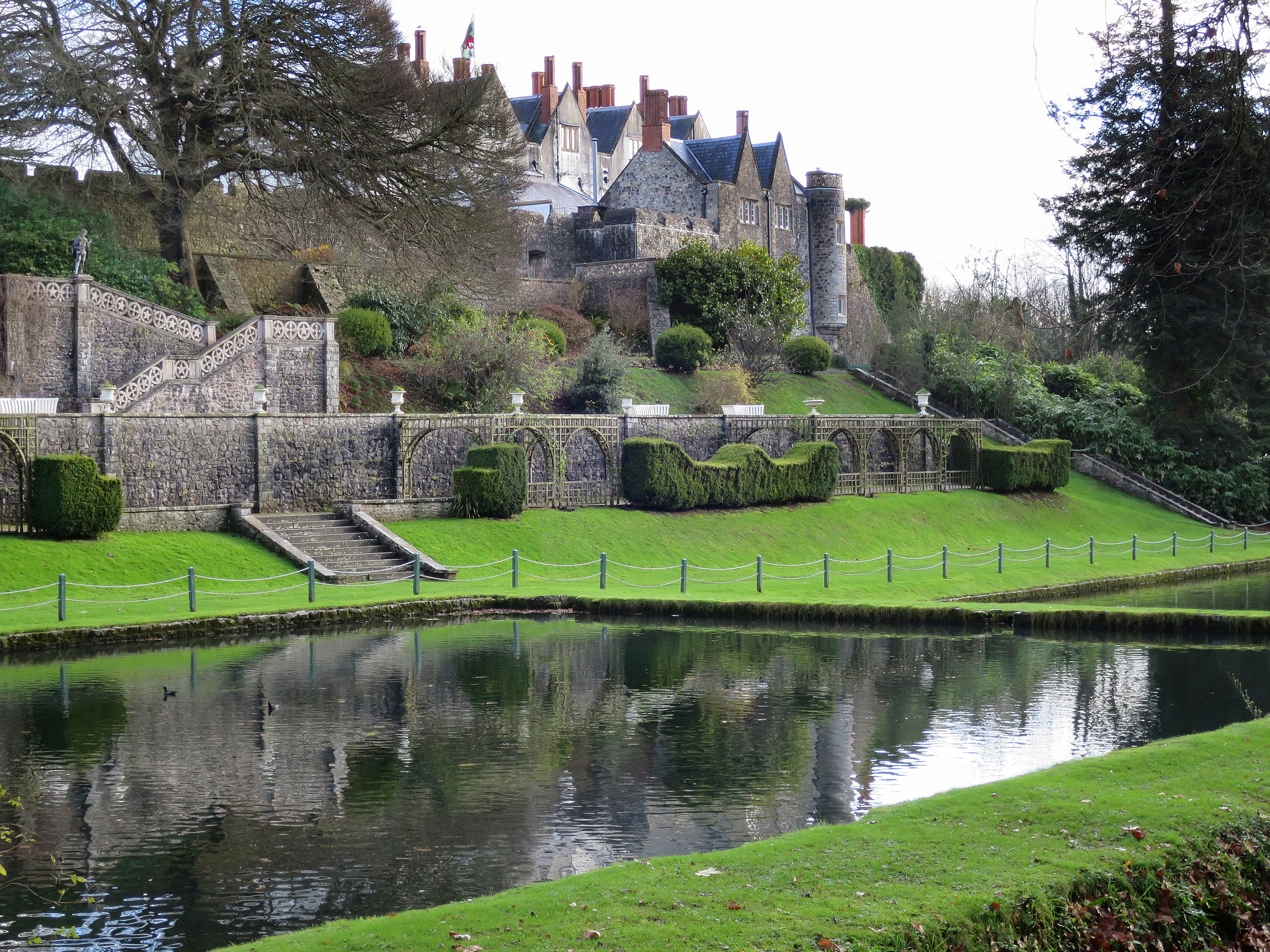
St Fagans Castle – Hugh Allan Pettigrew was head gardener and Andrew Alexander also worked there

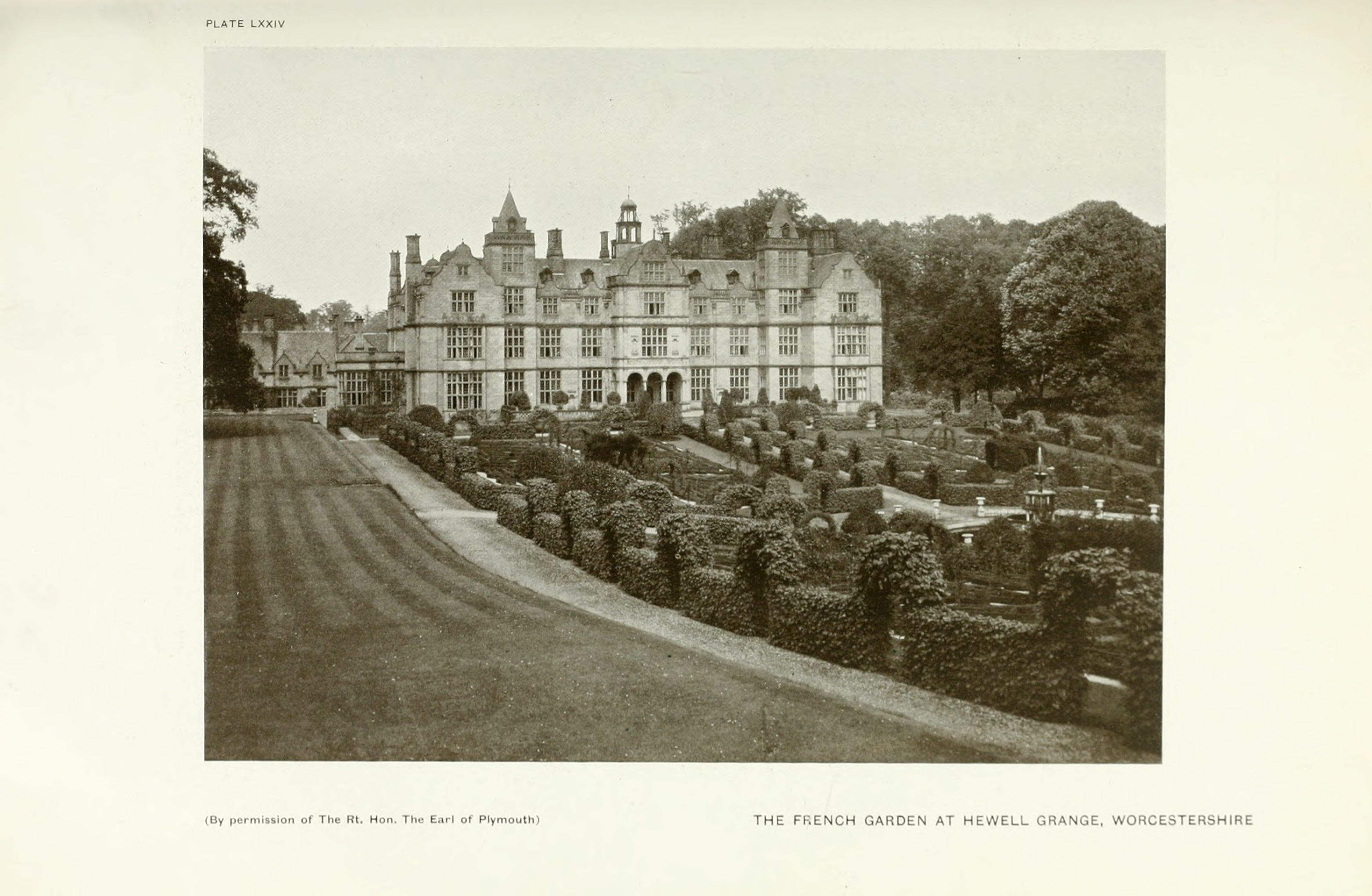
The French garden at Hewell Grange – both Hugh Allan and Andrew Alexander served as head gardener

== Sources ==
- Crook, J. Mordaunt (2013). William Burges and the High Victorian Dream. London, UK: Frances Lincoln. ISBN 978-0-7112-3349-2.
- Davies, John (1981). Cardiff and the Marquesses of Bute. Cardiff, UK: University of Wales Press. ISBN 9780708324639.
- James, Rosie (2017). "The Pettigrews: The family who landscaped Cardiff" (PDF). WHGT Bulletin (74). Welsh Historic Gardens Trust: 18–20.
- Johnston, Mark (2015). Trees in Towns and Cities: A History of British Urban Arboriculture. Havertown, US: Oxbow Books. ISBN 978-1-909-68663-2.
- Lilwall-Smith, Andrew (2005). Period Living & Traditional Homes Escapes. Andover, UK: Jarrold Publishing. ISBN 978-0-711-73594-1.
- Newman, John (1995). Glamorgan. The Buildings of Wales. London: Penguin Books. ISBN 978-0-140-71056-4. OCLC 1243807469.
- Pettigrew, Andrew Alexander (1926). "Welsh Vineyards". Transactions of the Cardiff Naturalists' Society. 59: 25–34.
- Stevens, Christine (1985). "An Edwardian Kitchen Garden at St Fagans Castle". Garden History. 13 (1): 25–34. doi:10.2307/1586757. JSTOR 1586757.
- Thomas, L. (1937). "Andrew Alexander Pettigrew: Obituary". Scientific Horticulture. 5. Chartered Institute of Horticulture: 179–180. JSTOR 45128494.
- WHGT (2019). "Bute Park 70th anniversary" (PDF). WHGT Bulletin (77). Welsh Historic Gardens Trust: 15.
