= Swiss Bridge, Cardiff Castle =

Swiss Bridge
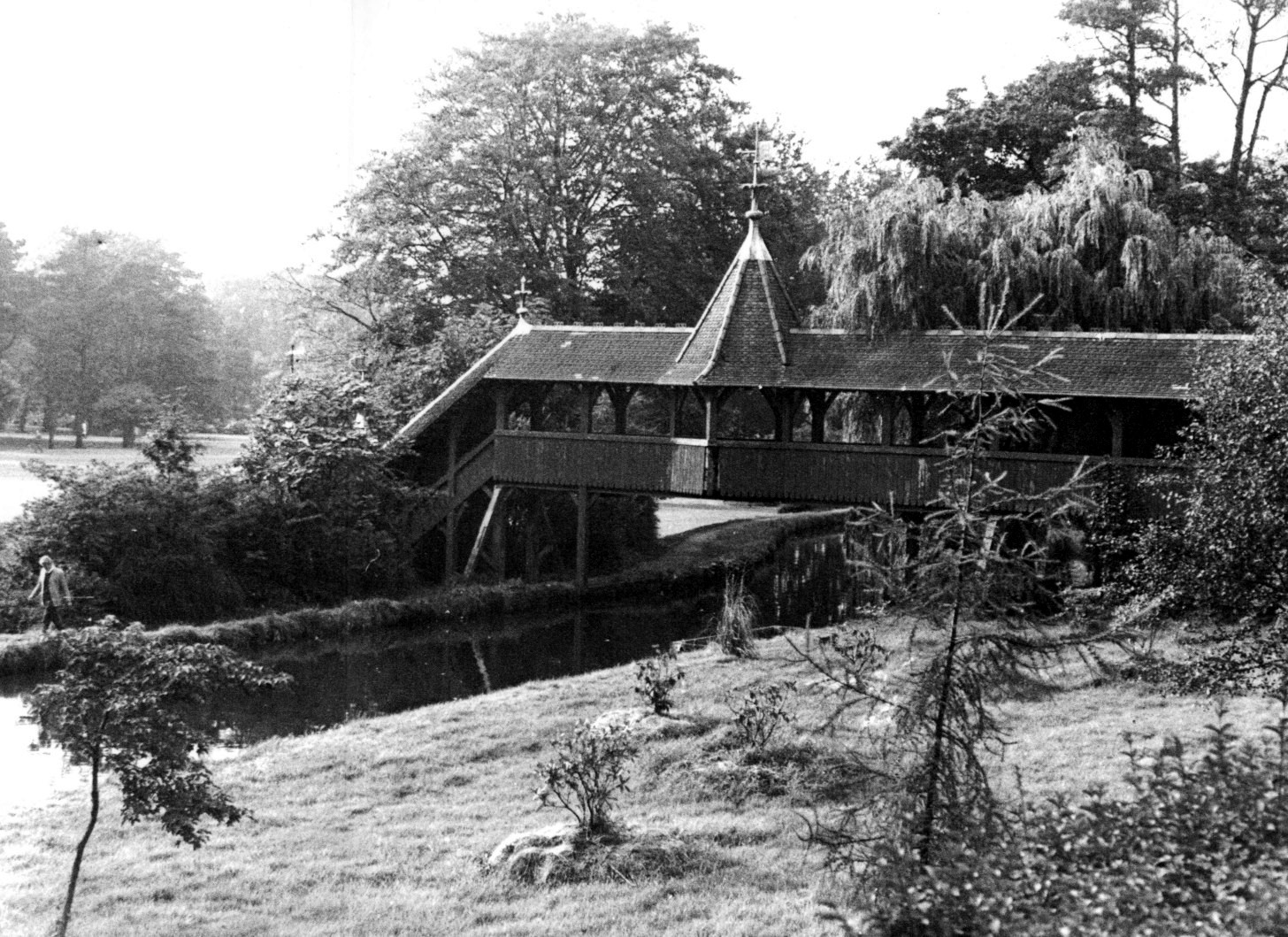
- Coordinates: 51°28′55″N 3°10′58″W
- Locale: Bute Park, Cardiff

History
- Architect: William Burges
- Construction start: 1873
- Destroyed: 1963

Location
- Interactive map of Swiss Bridge

The Swiss Bridge at Cardiff Castle was built by the architect William Burges for John Crichton-Stuart, 3rd Marquess of Bute in 1873. Modelled on the Kapellbrücke in the Swiss city of Lucerne, it provided a link from the castle into Bute's private gardens which now form Bute Park. By the 1960s, the bridge had become dilapidated and it was demolished in 1963.

== History ==
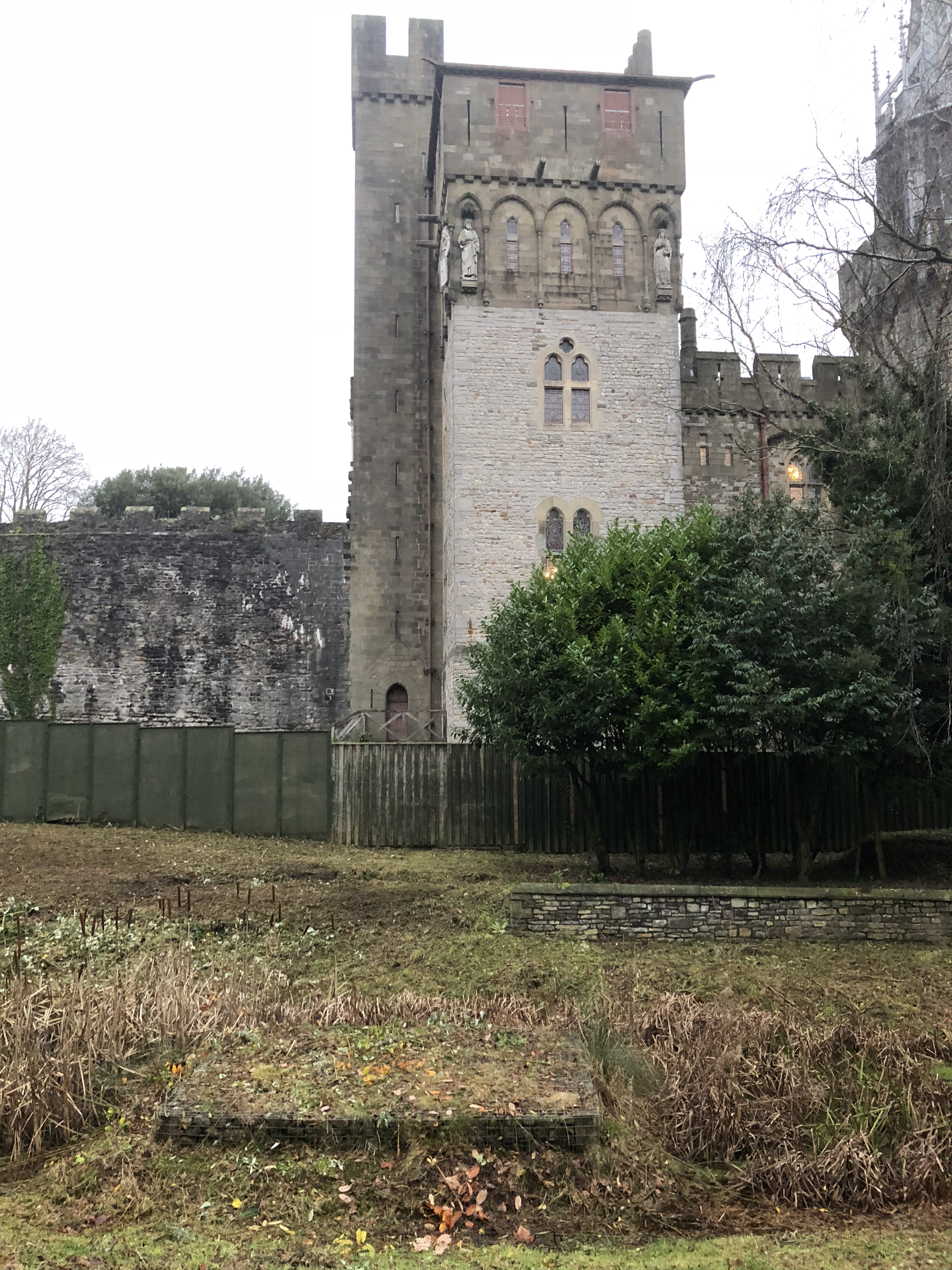
Site of the Swiss Bridge. The entrance doorway from the Bute Tower can be seen in the lower-centre and the central footing of the bridge in the immediate foreground

John Crichton-Stuart inherited his title and estates at the age of six months, in 1848 on the death of his father the second Marquess. His father's shrewd investments in the development of the port and city of Cardiff, and the enormous revenues from coal, together with his wider patrimony, left the third marquess very considerable wealth and at the time of his coming of age he was claimed to be "the richest man in the world". In 1865, the Marquess met William Burges and the two embarked on an architectural partnership, the results of which long outlasted Burges' own death in 1881. Bute's desires and money allied with Burges' fantastical imagination and skill led to the creation of two of the finest examples of the late Victorian era Gothic Revival, Cardiff Castle and Castell Coch.

Until the 1850s, Bute Park, laid out on the site of five farms and known as Cooper's Fields, was open to the public. In 1858, Bute's mother gave Sophia Gardens to the city and Bute Park was closed and transformed into the private gardens for the castle. The work was led by Bute's head gardener Andrew Pettigrew. Bute wanted an access point from the castle directly into the gardens and, in response, Burges gave him the Swiss Bridge. Construction began around 1873, although some sources give 1875 as the construction date. The timber bridge ran from a doorway opened up in the base of the Bute Tower across a leat directly into the park. In the 1920s, Bute's son had J. P. Grant construct a new West Gate into the castle at the corner of Bute Park and moved the Swiss Bridge to a new location below Castle Mews. By the 1960s, the bridge was derelict, having suffered considerably from vandalism, and Cardiff City Council had it broken up.

== Architecture and description ==
Burges modelled the bridge on the medieval Kapellbrücke at Lucerne which he had seen on his European travels in the 1850s. Like the Kapellbrücke, the Swiss Bridge was built in timber, constructed on a framework of stilts built over the leat. It had over-large eaves on the roof, topped with weathervanes fashioned into the initial B. The bridge concluded with a small summer-house on the Bute Park side. The bridge was constructed by Estcourts of Gloucester, prominent builders who worked for Burges on a number of projects and whose bill was £1,108. The architectural historian and Burges expert Joseph Mordaunt Crook called it a "jeu d'esprit, unique in this country".

== Sources ==
- Crook, J. Mordaunt (1981). The Strange Genius of William Burges. Cardiff, UK: Amgueddfa Cymru – Museum Wales. ISBN 9-78072-000259-1.
- Crook, J. Mordaunt (2013). William Burges and the High Victorian Dream. London, UK: Frances Lincoln. ISBN 978-0-7112-3349-2.
- Girouard, Mark (1979). The Victorian Country House. New Haven, US: Yale University Press. ISBN 9780300023909. "The Victorian Country House."
- Grant, John P. (1923). Cardiff Castle: Its History and Architecture. Cardiff, UK: William Lewis. OCLC 34158534.
- Hannah, Rosemary (2012). The Grand Designer: Third Marquess of Bute. Edinburgh, UK: Birlinn. ISBN 9781780270272.
- Newman, John (1995). Glamorgan. The Buildings of Wales. London, UK: Penguin. ISBN 9780300096293. OCLC 33858574.
