= Sparks in the Park =

Annual fireworks display in Cardiff, Wales

Sparks in the Park

Sparks in the Park is an annual fireworks display held in Cardiff, Wales on or around Guy Fawkes Night.

The event takes place in Cooper's Field in Bute Park, behind Cardiff Castle. It has been held annually since 1981, and has become the most popular fireworks display in Wales, and one of the most popular in the UK, attracting around 20,000 people.

The event is organised by local charitable and social networking group Cardiff Round Table, one of the largest branches in the UK of Round Table (club). It is a non profit event- all proceeds are distributed to charity, primarily in and around the Cardiff area. Charities to have benefited from monies raised during Sparks in the Park 2009 include the Christian Lewis Trust, the Sequal Trust, Vitalise, CLIC Sargent, Round Table Children's Wish, Barnardo's Cymru and Hospital Radio Glamorgan.

== History ==
Prior to 2009, the event had been held for several years in Blackweir Field, at the north end of Bute Park, further away from the city centre. This was because of concerns that Cardiff Council had about the potential damage to Cooper's Field. Improvements made to drainage and access on the site have made it possible for the event to move back. Various other events have also been held in the field in 2010, such as a concert by Florence and the Machine and Cardiff Mardi Gras.

The largest amount ever raised for charity by Sparks in the Park was £67,000 in 2017.
