= Cardiff Horse Show =

Former annual horse show in Wales

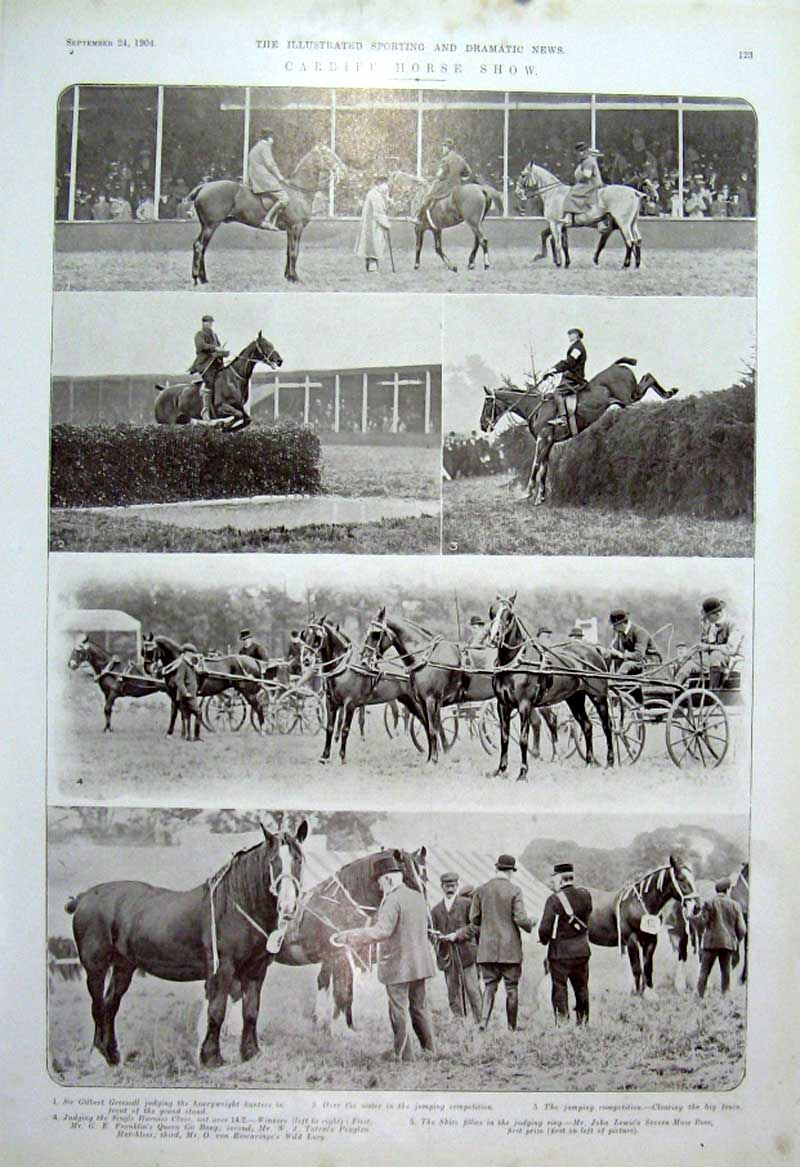
Cardiff Horse Show, 1904

Cardiff Horse Show, also the Cardiff and South Wales Horse Show or Royal Horse Show was an annual horse show held in May in Cardiff, south Wales in the late 19th and early 20th centuries. It attracted farmers from all across Glamorganshire, and was held at Sophia Gardens.

The show was hugely popular, with 16,000 people attending over two days in 1896.

The competition consisted of various exhibits with entrants competing to be best in class. In 1985 there were 51 categories consisting of 11 for harness horses, 10 for hunters, 9 for trotting and jumps, 7 for brood mares, 6 for cart and colliery horses, 5 for hacks, and 3 for hackneys.
