= Roath Park =

Park in Cardiff, Wales

- Welsh: Parc y Rhath
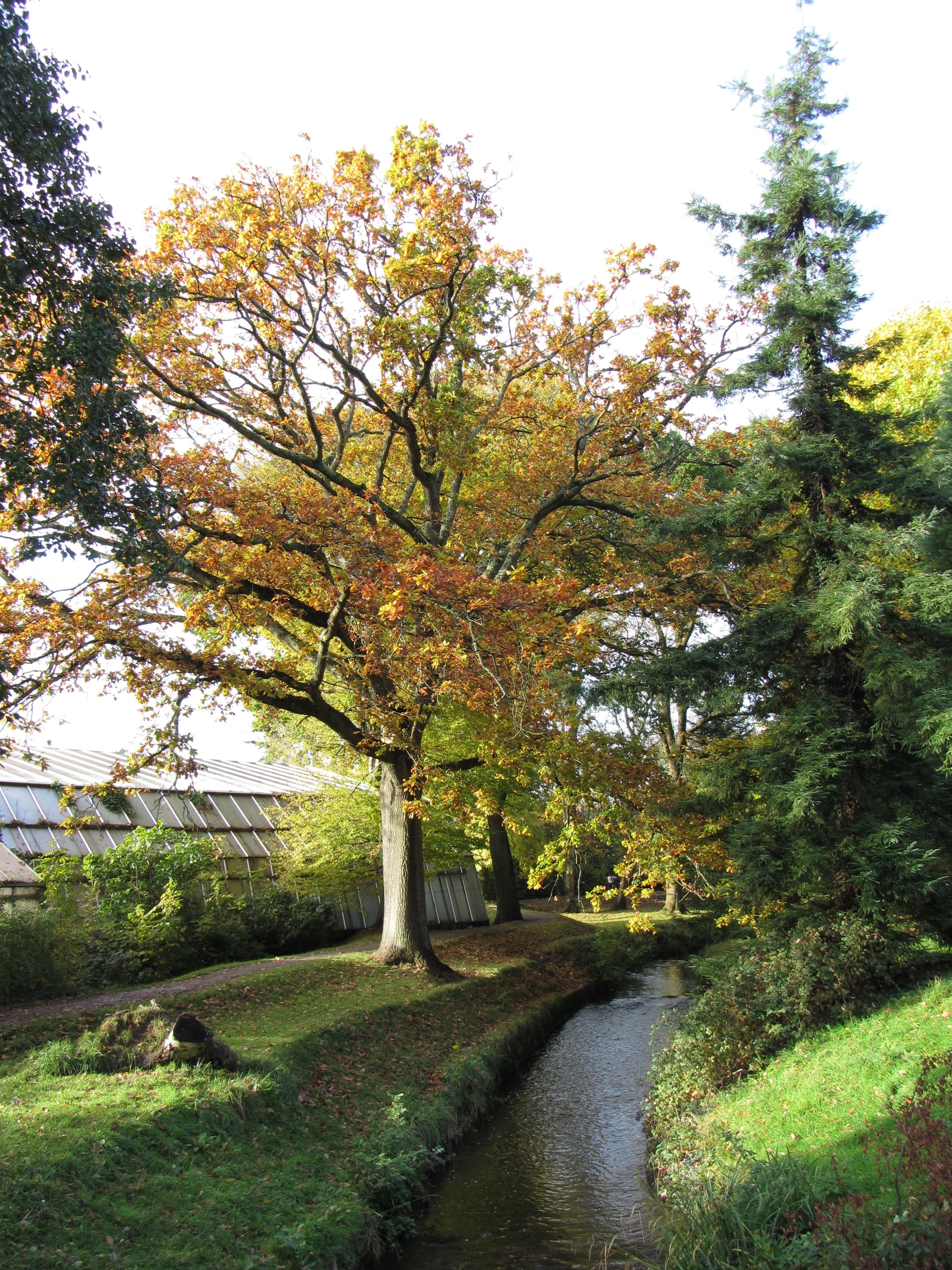
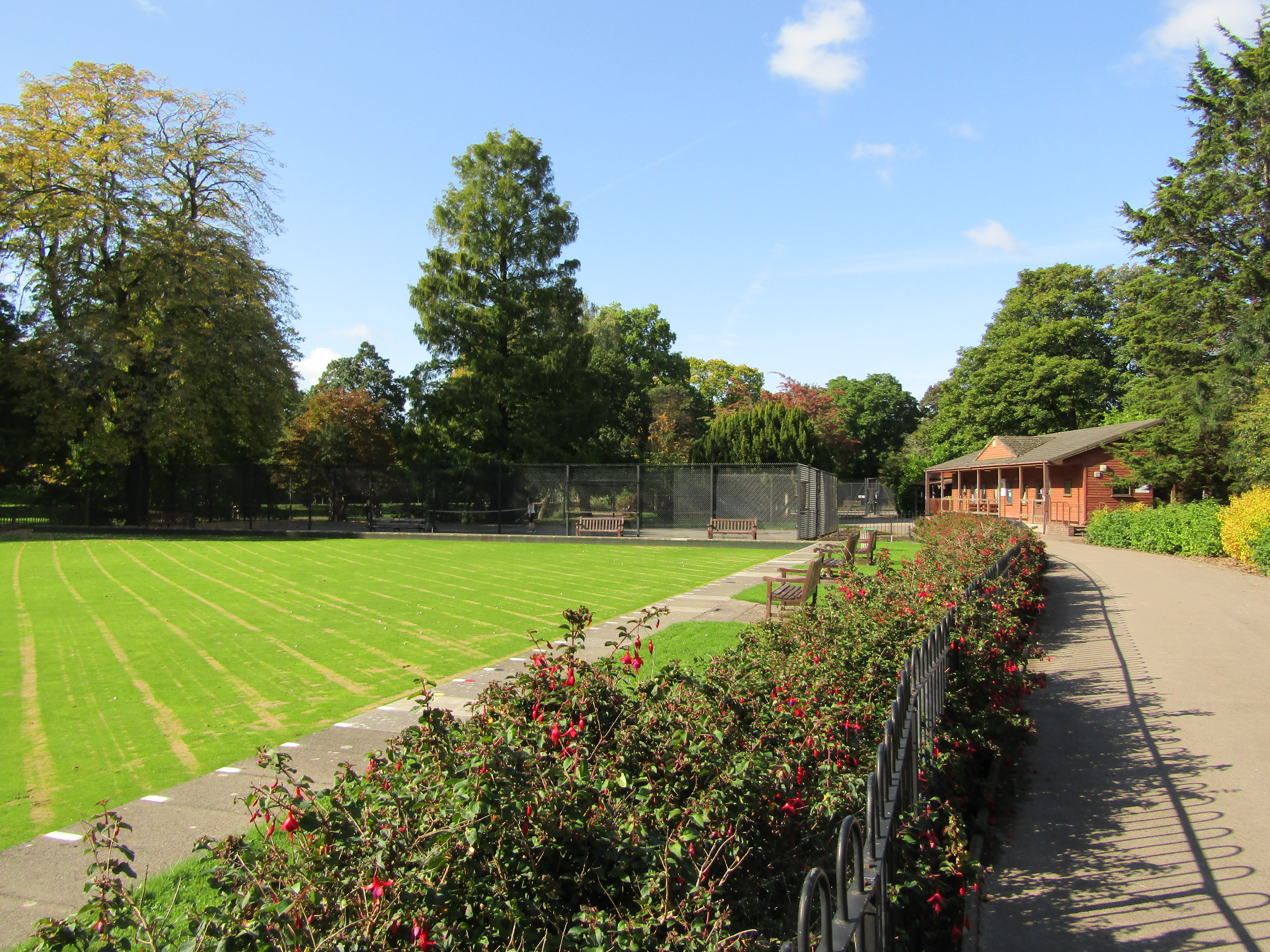
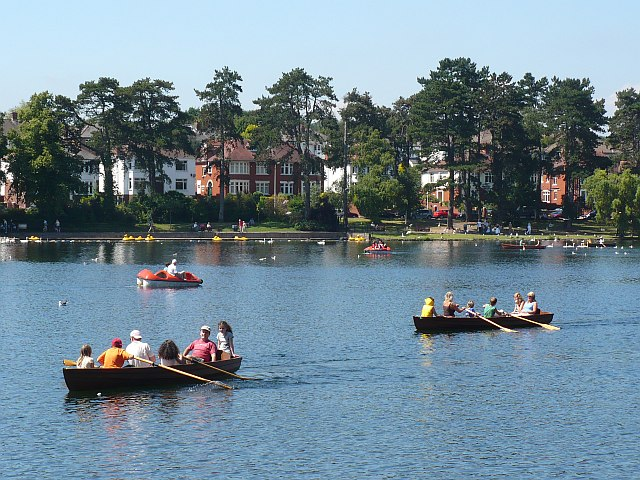
- From left to right: Top: Roath Brook & Conservatory; Bottom: Bowling Green at Roath Pleasure Garden; Boating on Roath Lake
- Interactive map of Roath Park
- Location: Roath, Cardiff, Wales
- Coordinates: 51.5075°N 3.175°W
- Area: 130 acres (53 ha)
- Opened: 1894
- Operator: Cardiff Council
- Status: Open year-round
- Website: Outdoor Cardiff: Roath Park

Cadw/ICOMOS Register of Parks and Gardens of Special Historic Interest in Wales
- Official name: Roath Park
- Designated: 1 February 2022; 4 years ago
- Reference no.: PGW(Gm)24(CDF)
- Listing: Grade I

Roath Park (Welsh: Parc y Rhath) is a park in Cardiff, Wales. The park was built on 130 acres (0.53 km^{2}) of reformed bogland, known then as a malarial bog, and includes a 30-acre (12 ha) lake, 1.3 miles (2.1 km) around, formed by the damming of the Nant Fawr stream. It is a popular facility for fishing and rowing. There are four islands within a conservation area, home to many water birds. The main park includes a large playground, floral displays, the glasshouse conservatory and recreational areas.

Roath park occupies a long strip of land stretching from Cyncoed in the north to Roath towards the southeast. The park is divided into several parts along the Roath Brook (Welsh: Nant Fawr, Nant y Lleuchi or Nant y Derwen Deg). From north to south, these divisions are: Wild Gardens, Roath Park Lake, Botanical Gardens, Rose Gardens, Pleasure Gardens, Roath Park Recreation Ground, Roath Brook Gardens, Roath Mill Gardens, Waterloo Gardens and the Sandies Open Space.

Two volunteer "Friends" groups work with Cardiff Council to maintain the park. The Friends of Roath Park serve the northern section of the park as far as Penylan Hill. The south-eastern section of the park is served by the Friends of Penylan's Gardens.

== History ==
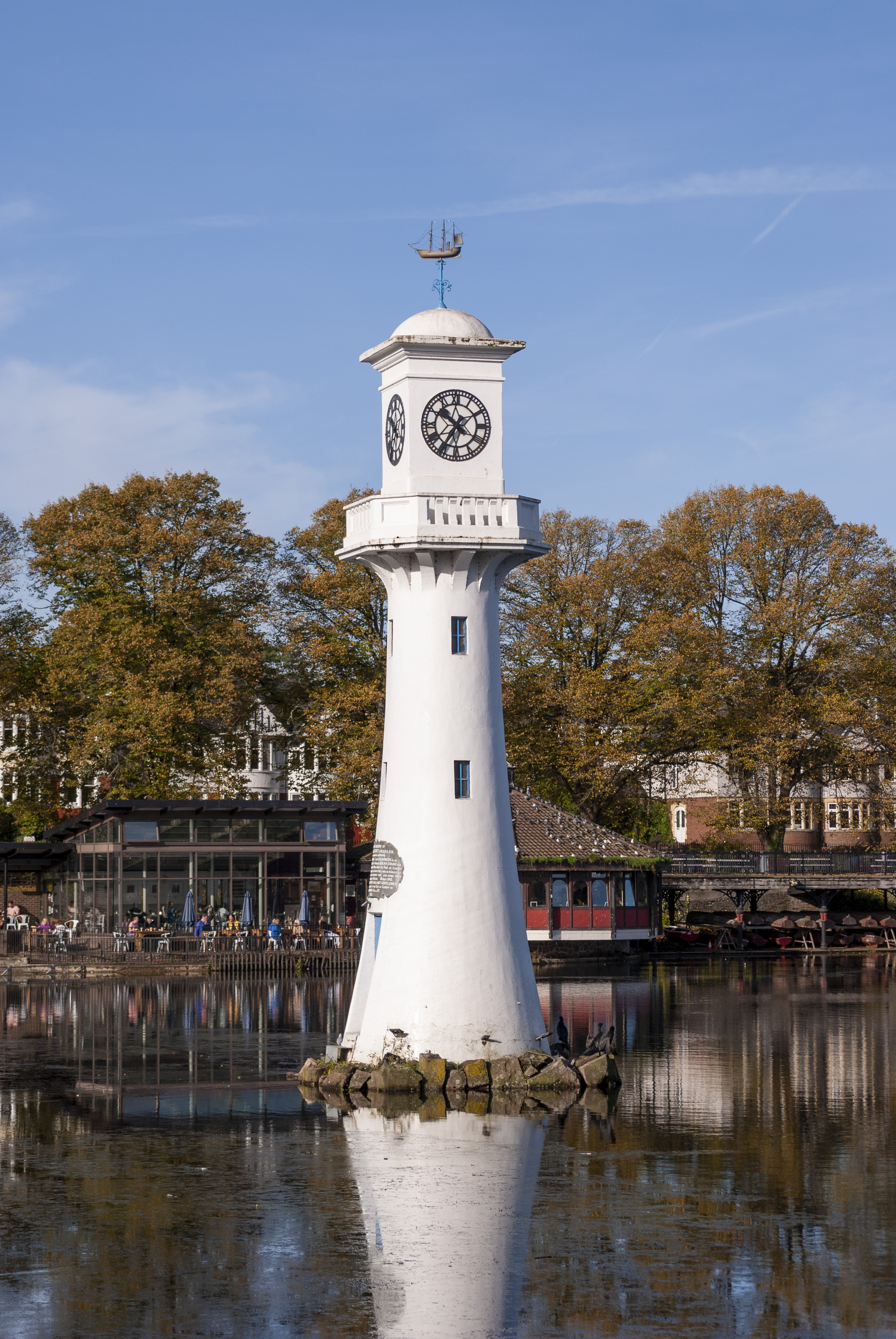
The Scott Memorial

A new park in the area, with a lake, was proposed in 1886, on land owned by Lord Tredegar. The land was covered with clay pits and also had a watermill which would need removing.

The land for Roath Park was donated to the city in 1887, primarily by John Crichton-Stuart, 3rd Marquess of Bute. The design was partly the work of Bute's head gardener, Andrew Pettigrew, but mainly of his son,William Wallace, in conjunction with the corporation's chief engineer, William Harpur. The first section of the park was officially opened to the public in 1894 and it continued to be opened in sections over the following two decades. Work initially focused on creating the lake from an area of marshland. In 1915 a lighthouse was constructed in the lake containing a scale model of the Terra Nova ship to commemorate Captain Scott's ill-fated voyage to the Antarctic from Cardiff in 1910. The park's atmosphere today still retains a Victorian and Edwardian character; the park itself is locally listed, and the surrounding streets are designated across three Conservation Areas to ensure this quality will be conserved. The park itself is Grade I listed on the Cadw/ICOMOS Register of Parks and Gardens of Special Historic Interest in Wales. Waterloo Gardens, Roath Mill Gardens and Roath Brook Gardens have a separate listing at Grade II.

In 2003, the park was used for filming for an episode of the TV series of The Story of Tracy Beaker. In 2019 the BBC reported that the lake had been polluted for several years by unauthorised sewage discharges.

In 2024, the path along the southern edge of the park was widened to accommodate a cycle path.

== Nature ==
There is a wide range of habitats in the park, which attracts a diverse variety of wildlife. The lake acts as an important habitat for over-wintering and breeding birds, including mallard, cormorants and herons. Four islands within the lake, which are inaccessible to the public, are safe nesting sites. The lake has a population of about 100 swans and a number of geese. Many wild birds are scared off by the abundance of geese in the lake, and local conservationists actively take measures to control their numbers. There is a wildflower garden included in the park where the area is managed to encourage wildlife and native species.

=== Trees ===
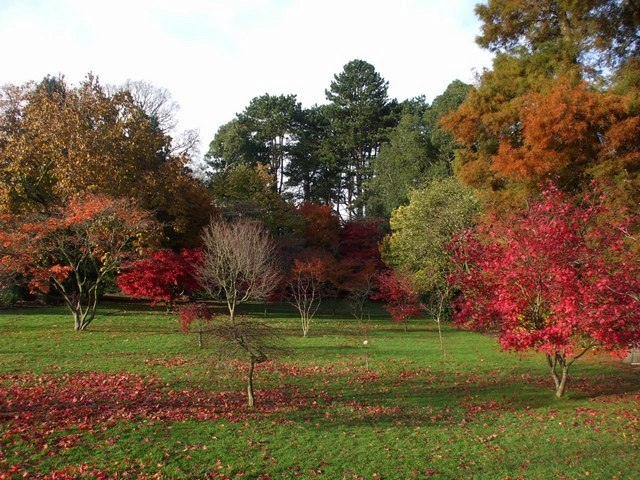
Autumn colours, Roath Park

The Tree Register of the British Isles, is an organisation which records and measures trees in the UK. The biggest and best of their kind are called Champion Trees; there are twelve of these in Roath Park.

There is a trail with marker posts to identify the following trees:

1. Quercus bicolor (Swamp white oak)
2. Ginkgo biloba 'Pendula', (Weeping maidenhair)
3. Ulmus 'Sapporo autumn gold' (Sapporo elm)
4. Pterostyrax corymbosa
5. Ilex macrocarpa
6. Laurus nobilis 'Aurea', (Golden bay)
7. Meliosma parviflora
8. Emmenopterys henryi
9. Quercus × andegavennis
10. Quercus pyrenaica, (Pyrenean oak)
11. Malus 'Magdeburgensis, (Magdeburg apple)
12. Pyrus calleryana 'Chanticleer' (Callery pear)
13. Maclura pomifera, (Osage orange)

Two oak trees predate the establishment of the park and have been calculated to be about 250 years old.

== Recreation ==
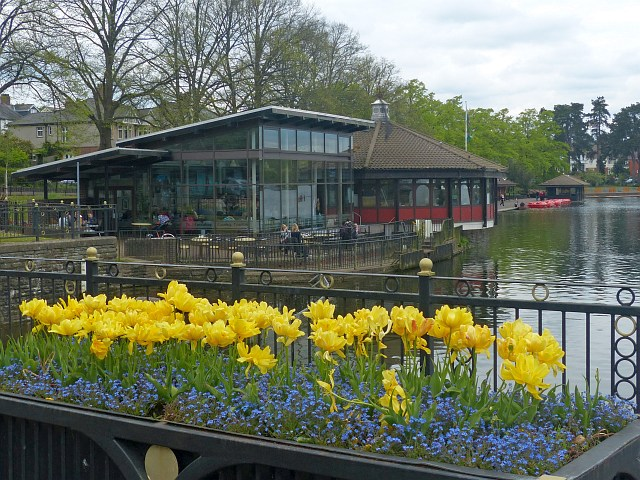
Terra Nova Café, Roath Park Lake

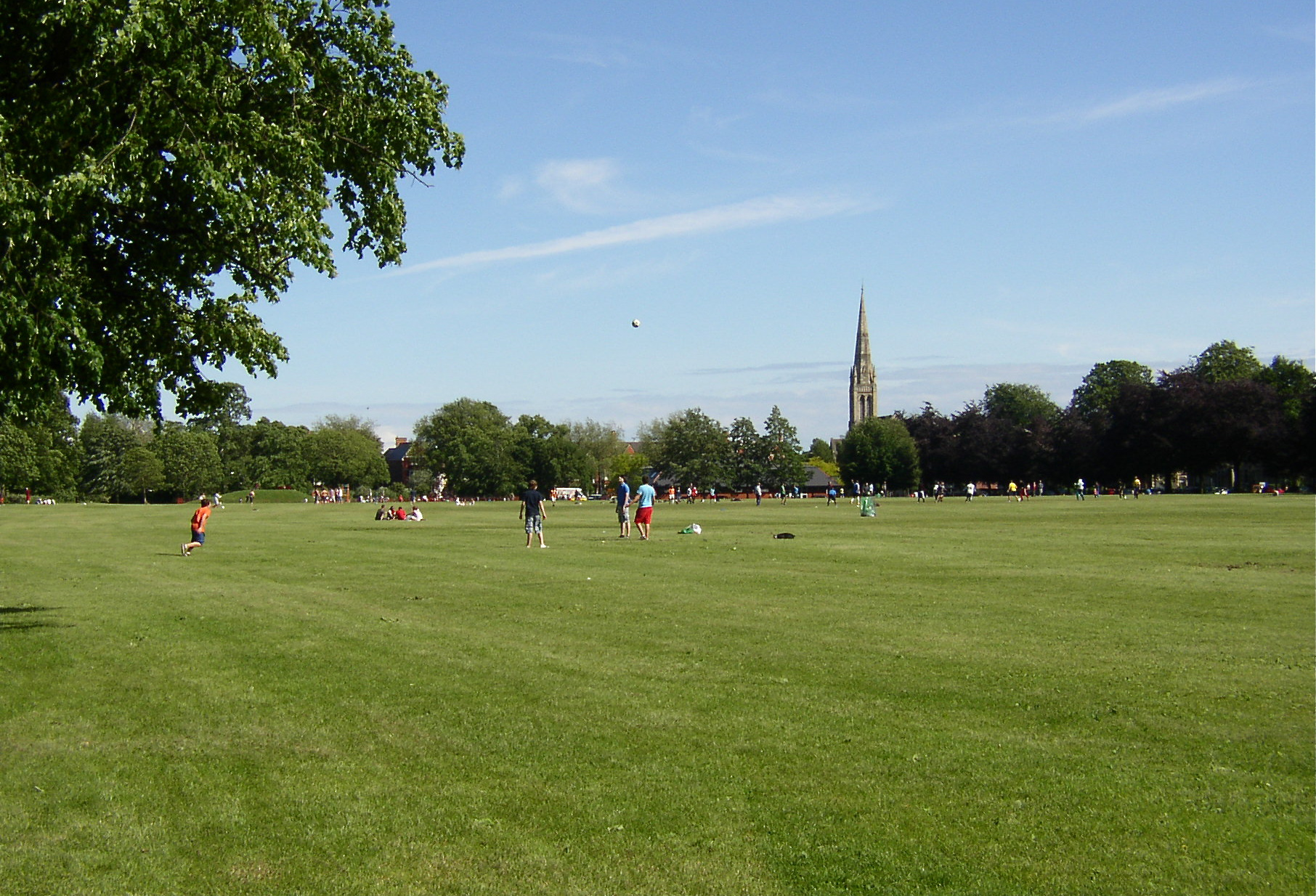
Roath Recreation Ground

Roath Park Recreation Ground, towards the southern end of the park, contains sports pitches available for activities such as football, baseball and rugby union. Bowling greens and tennis courts are provided in the central section of the park, the Pleasure Gardens. Rowing boats are available for hire on the lake. The lake hosts a radio-controlled boat society and is used for coarse fishing throughout the year. There are also two playgrounds.

Swimming was permitted when the lake opened, but was stopped after concerns about impurity of the water were raised in 1949. The Taff Swim, the Long Distance Swimming Championship of Wales, continued until 1963. Water carnivals and water skiing still took place in the 1960s and 1970s.

== Conservatory ==
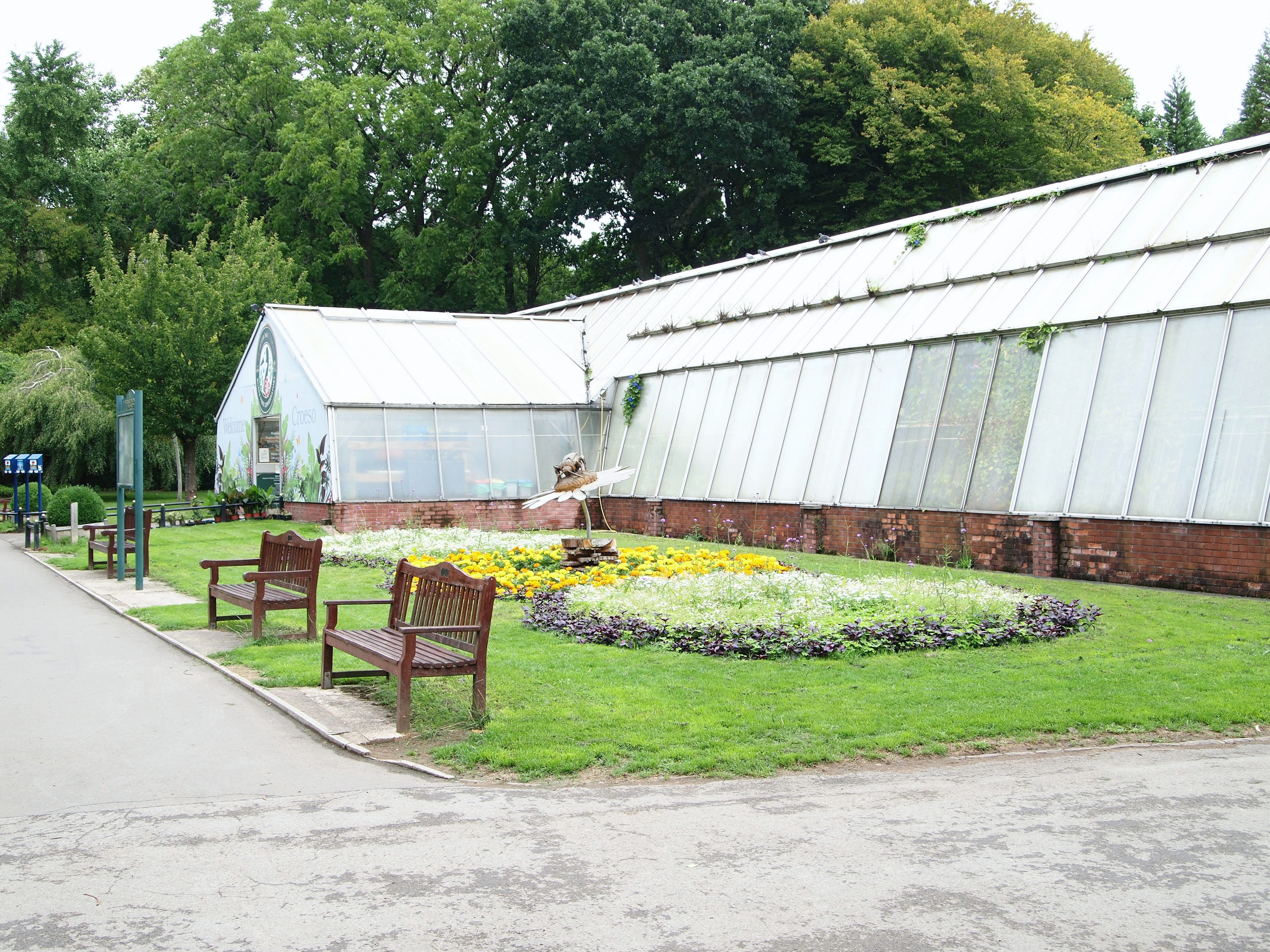
The Conservatory at Roath Park

There is a glasshouse in Roath Park which was built in the 1970s, replacing two earlier ones from the early 1900s. It contains many unusual species of plants and trees such as palms, banana trees and orchids. A pond and waterfall form a central feature, containing fish, terrapins and whistling ducks. Swan and duck food is on sale for feeding the birds on the lake.

== Ornamental gardens ==
Floral displays in the park include flowerbeds along the promenade and the rose garden, which included trial beds for the National Rose Society.

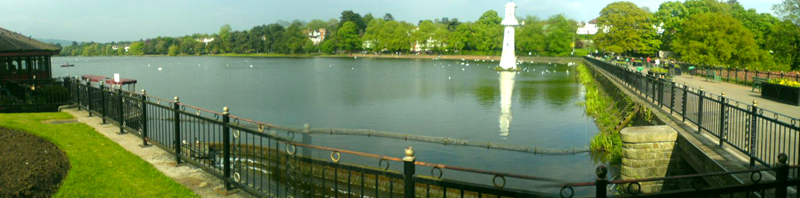
Roath Park Lake, with the café and boat hire to the left and the dam and promenade on the right

== See also ==
- List of gardens in Wales
