= Bute Park =

Landscaped garden and parkland in Cardiff, Wales

Bute Park and Arboretum
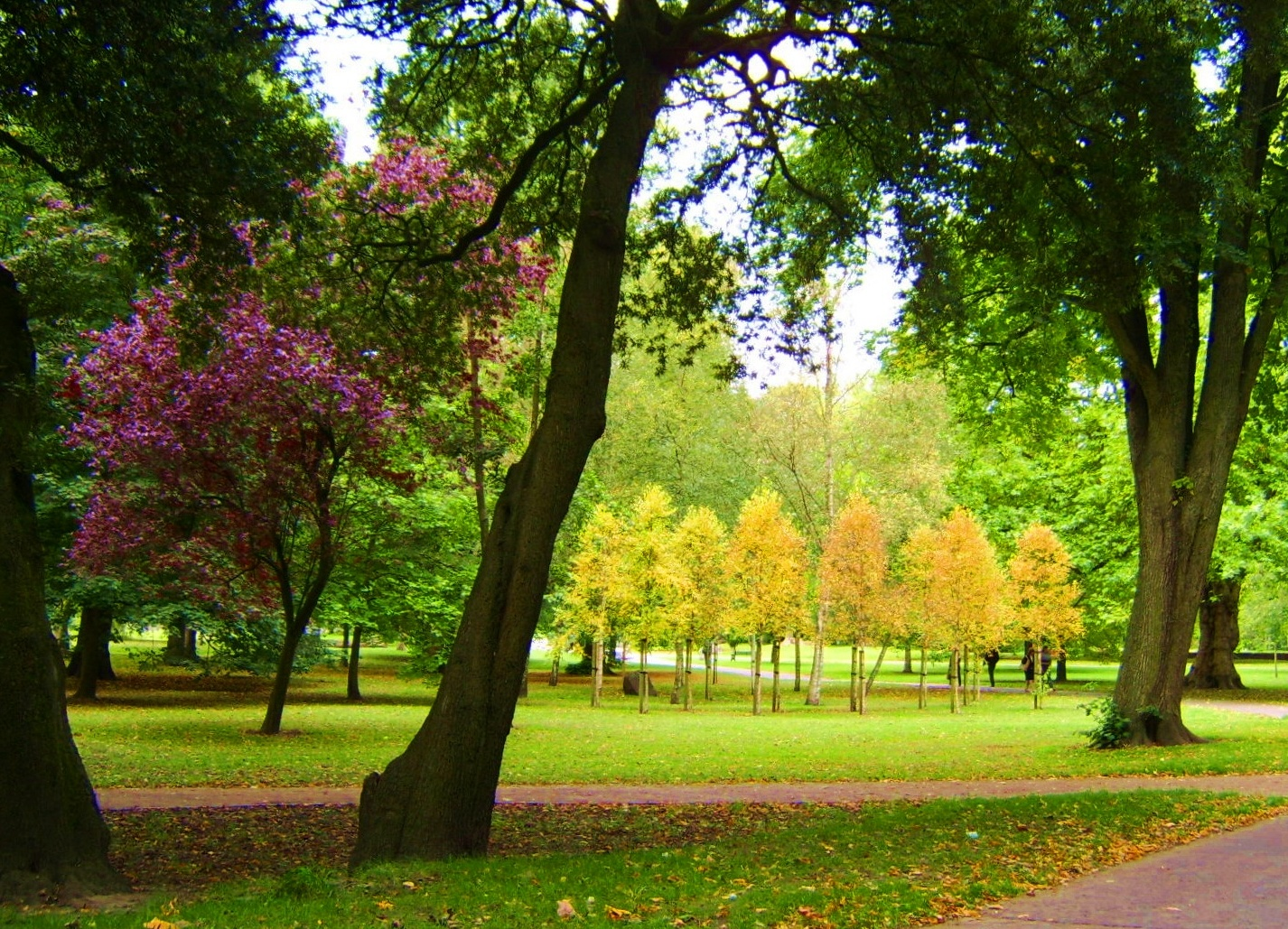
- Interactive map of Bute Park and Arboretum
- Location: Cardiff, Wales
- Coordinates: 51°29′20″N 3°11′20″W
- Owner: County Council of the City and County of Cardiff

Cadw/ICOMOS Register of Parks and Gardens of Special Historic Interest in Wales
- Official name: Cardiff Castle and Bute Park
- Designated: 1 February 2022; 3 years ago
- Reference no.: PGW(Gm)22(CDF)
- Listing: Grade I

Bute Park and Arboretum (Welsh: Parc a Gardd Goed Bute) is a park in Cardiff, Wales. It comprises 130 acres (53 ha) of landscaped gardens and parkland that once formed the grounds of Cardiff Castle. The park is named after the 3rd Marquess of Bute, whose family owned the castle.

== History and description ==
The Castle Green was landscaped in the late eighteenth century by Capability Brown, but the park itself was laid out from 1873 on by Andrew Pettigrew, head gardener to the 3rd Marquess. In 1947, the 5th Marquess of Bute presented the park to Cardiff County Borough Council. It is still held in trust for the citizens of Cardiff, by Cardiff Council, who maintain the park with the aid of volunteers & community groups

The park is situated along the east bank of the River Taff and adjoining Cardiff Castle, and offers a combination of arboretum, flower gardens and recreation grounds. Most of the park is laid to grassland but there is an abundance of woodland and tree-lined avenues. Sophia Gardens and Pontcanna Fields are on the opposite side of the river, reached by two footbridges. Sophia Gardens is home to the Glamorgan County Cricket Ground, where test matches are played, and to the Sport Wales National Centre.

Within the park there are sculptures such as wood carvings formed from retained tree stumps (in 2012, a series of additional carvings were commissioned as part of the Restoration Project) which encourage natural play. An ironwork sundial, originally placed in the park in 1990 after a Festival of Iron event, was removed in 2006 and replaced by a small, round formal garden to honour Stuttgart (Cardiff's German twin town). This feature was designed by the Parks Service in Stuttgart and planted by horticultural apprentices from both cities as part of a programme of exchange visits between the two parks departments.

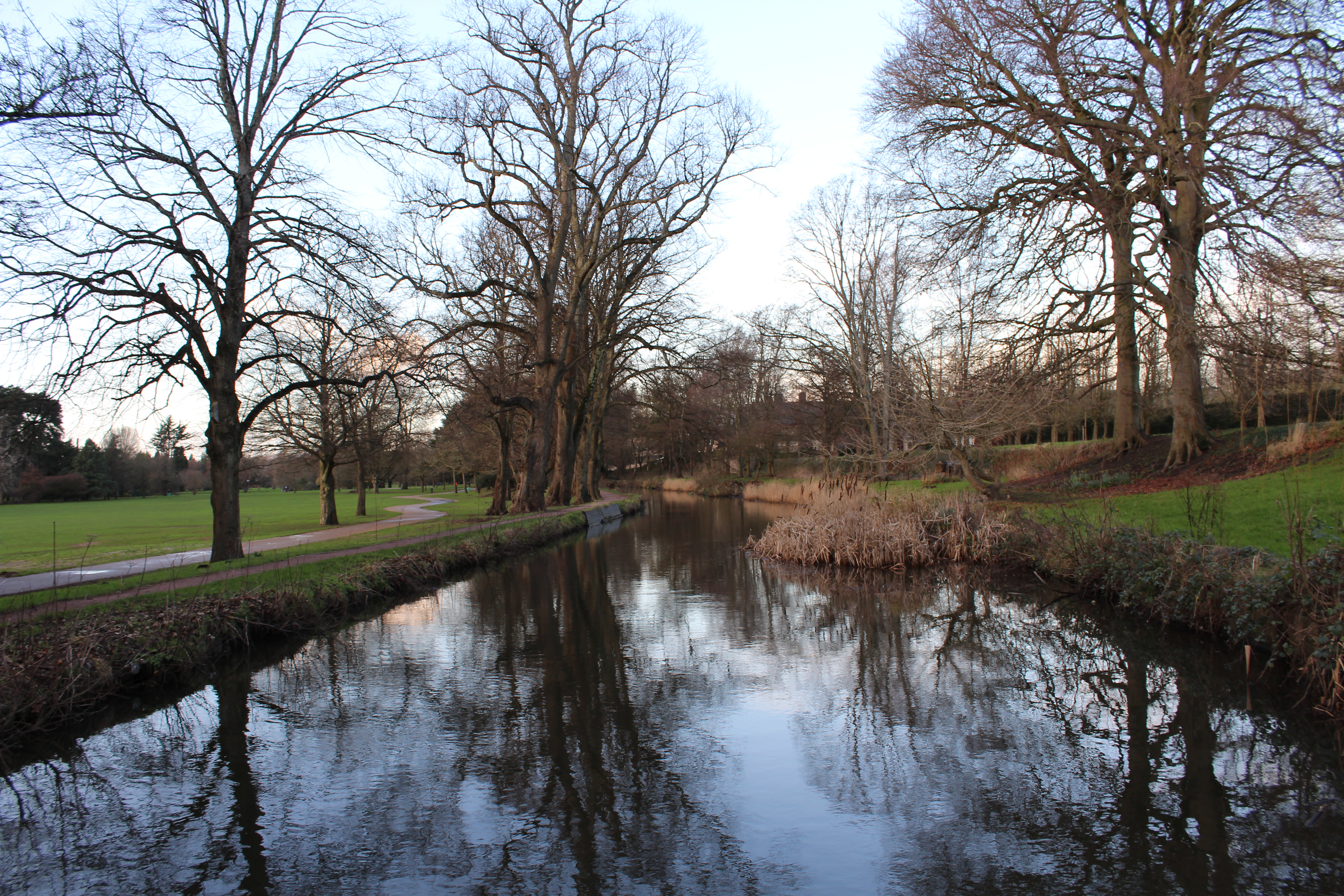
The dock feeder canal in Bute Park

The dock feeder canal runs along the eastern edge of the park. Its origins go back to medieval times when it was a millstream, constructed to feed the Lord's Mill, situated below the western walls of Cardiff Castle. This line is clearly seen on the Bute Estate Maps of 1824. In 1833, the line of the mill stream was incorporated as a water source for the development of Cardiff Docks by the 2nd Marquess of Bute and was reformed as the dock feeder when the docks were constructed between 1836 and 1841. The dock feeder is still the main water supply to the docks.

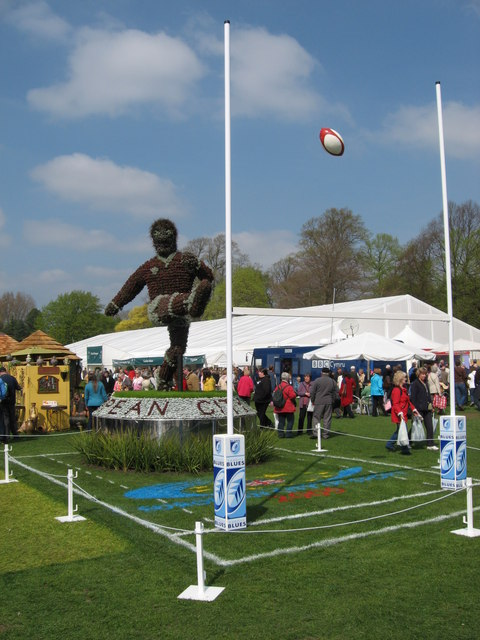
The annual RHS Show Cardiff has been held in Bute Park since 2005.

Between 1981 and 2019, the park hosted an annual Guy Fawkes Night firework display, named Sparks in the Park in its later years. The event was organised by Cardiff's local branch of Round Table and profits were distributed to charity. The event was cancelled due to the COVID-19 pandemic in 2020 and 2021, and in 2022 it was cancelled indefinitely due to increasing costs and organisational issues.

The Cooper's Field part of the park has hosted concerts by artists including Florence and the Machine, You Me at Six and Emeli Sandé.

Bute Park and the grounds of Cardiff Castle are designated Grade I on the Cadw/ICOMOS Register of Parks and Gardens of Special Historic Interest in Wales.

== Bute Park Restoration Project ==
From 2007 Cardiff Council undertook a £5.6 million restoration project, which was part-funded by a £3.1 million grant from the Heritage Lottery Fund. The project provided new facilities and restored historic features in the park, including:

- Summerhouse Kiosk, providing refreshments and toilets, built in 2010 to a design that echoes William Burges's summerhouse in the park.
- Animal Wall, designed by William Burges (1827–1881), a stone wall topped by sculpted animal heads, cleaned and conserved in 2010.
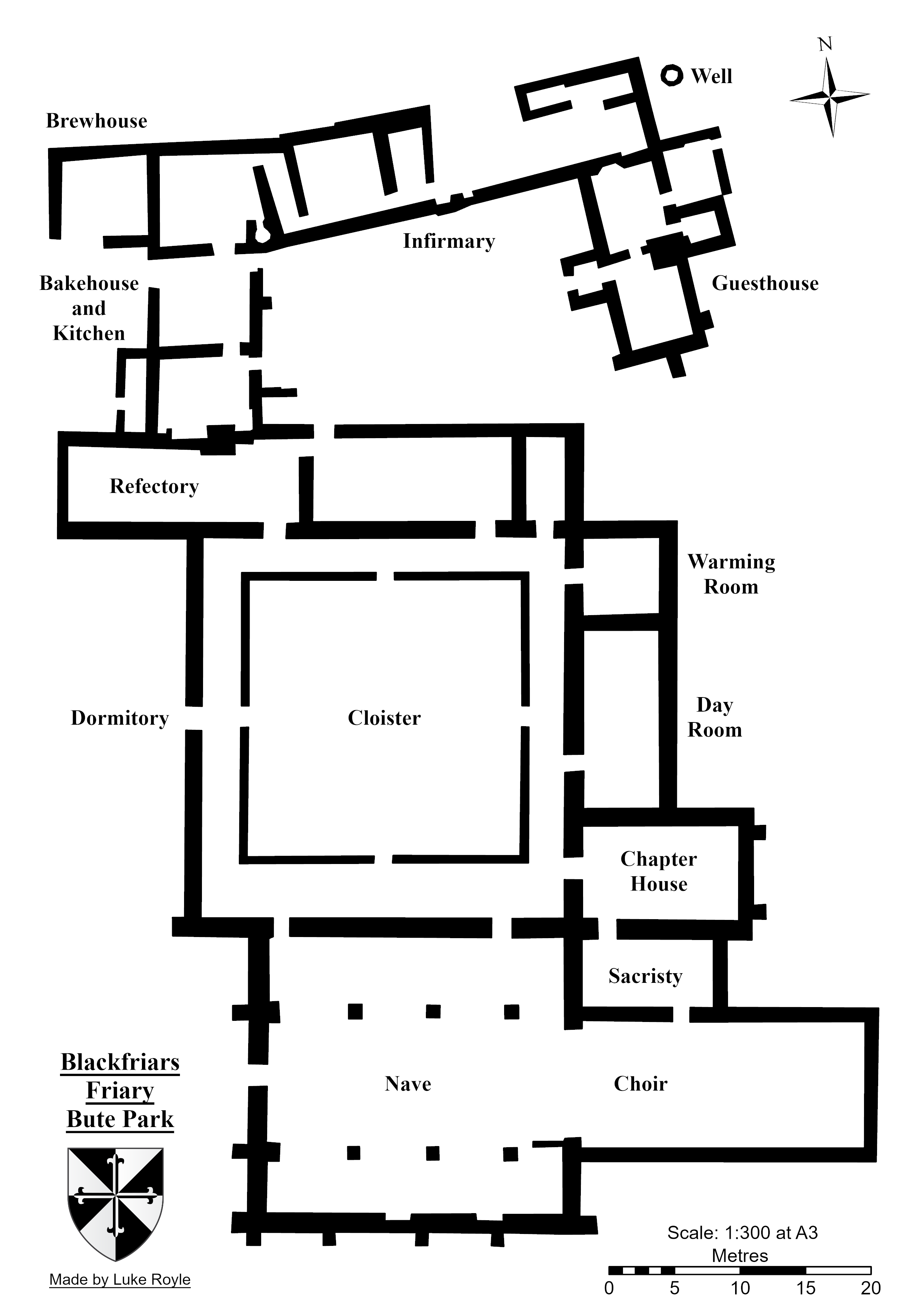
  Approximate layout of original Blackfriars Friary.
- Blackfriars Friary: Work undertaken to conserve and interpret the medieval Friary remains, using Victorian brickwork walls to mark the building's plan.
- West Lodge: The restoration and extension of this historic building and gateway provides a visitor information/orientation point, now used as the Pettigrew Tea Rooms.
- Mill Leat: Reintroduction of water to the old castle moat that runs alongside the original 12th-century mill stream, to restore views and enhance the character of the park to the west of Cardiff Castle.
- Bute Park Arboretum: Improved signage and interpretation to allow increased awareness and understanding of the park's nationally significant tree collection.
- Education Centre: A new facility located within Bute Park Nursery, and playing on the concept of a "secret garden". It became the hub of the park's public education programme. The council's horticultural staff train here, and it provides additional refreshment and toilet facilities.

The park is maintained by a team of Park Rangers and gardeners based on site, who are supported by volunteers.

== Bridges and entrances to Bute Park ==
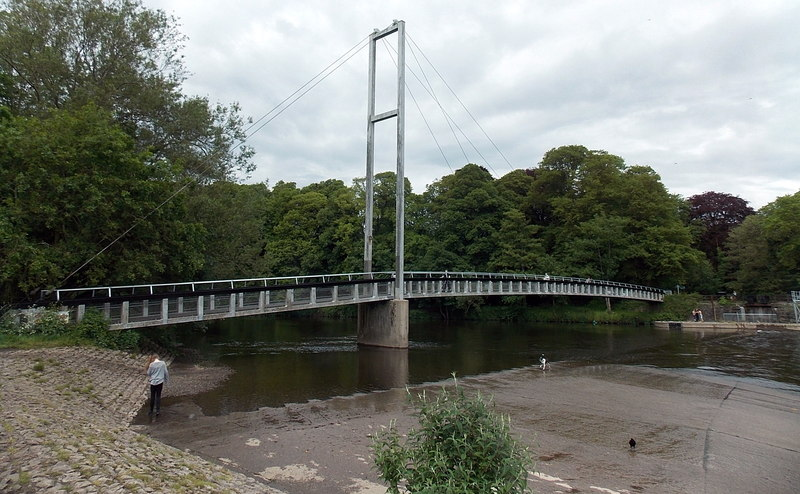
Blackweir Bridge – the northern end of the park

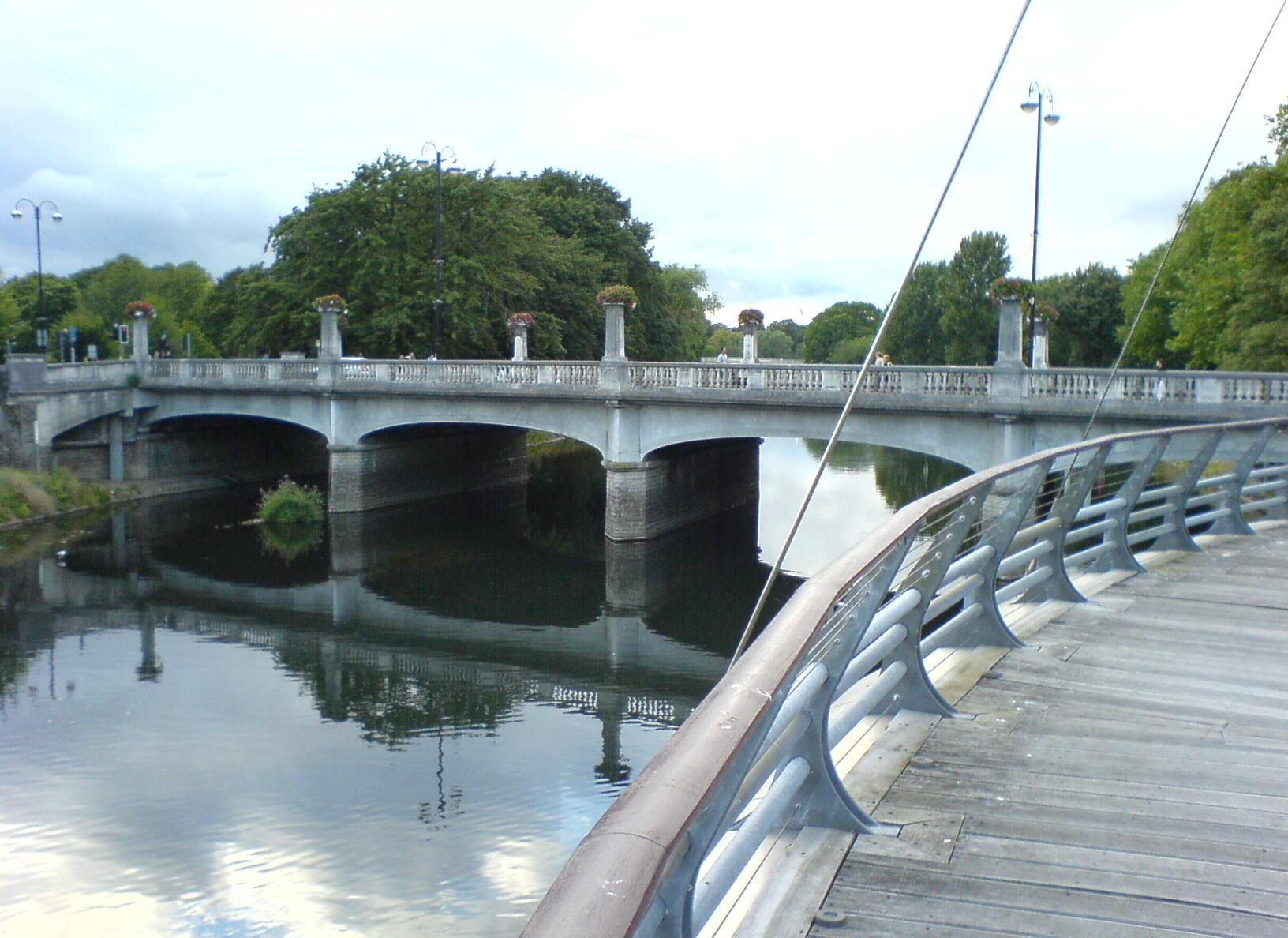
Cardiff Bridge – the southern end of the park

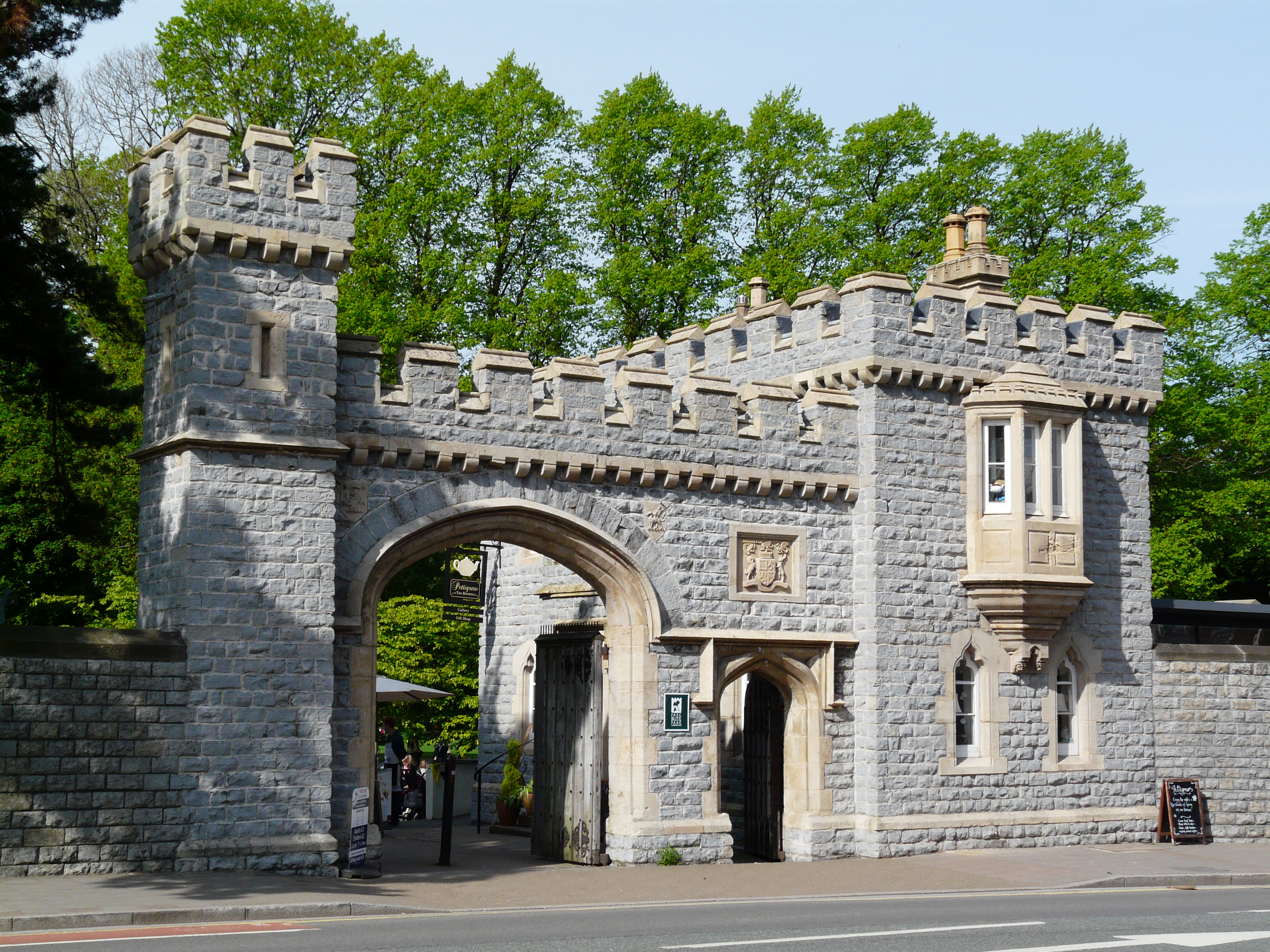
Entrance in Castle Street (with the Grade II* listed West Lodge Gate to the right)

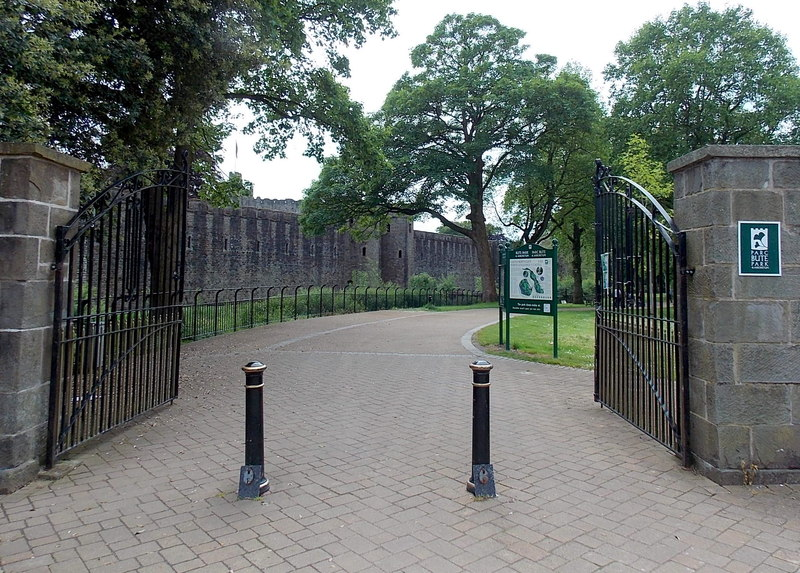
Entrance in North Road by Cardiff Castle (left)

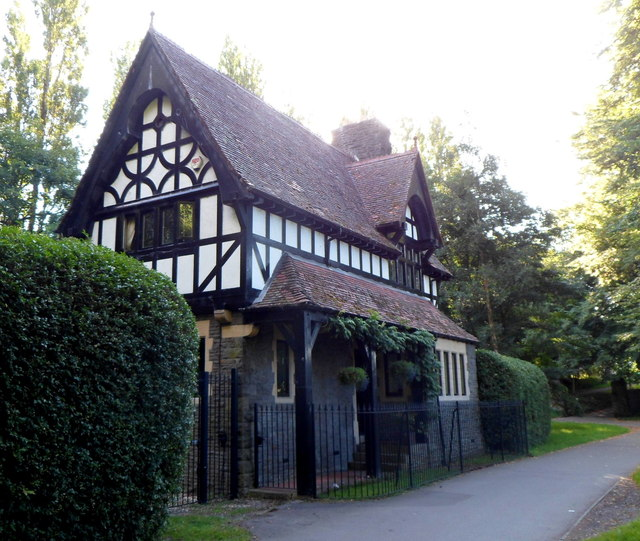
The Grade II listed Park Lodge close to the northern entrance

== See also ==
- List of gardens in Wales
