= Ilex macrocarpa =

Scientific classification
- Kingdom: Plantae
- Clade: Tracheophytes
- Clade: Angiosperms
- Clade: Eudicots
- Clade: Asterids
- Order: Aquifoliales
- Family: Aquifoliaceae
- Genus: Ilex
- Species: I. macrocarpa

Binomial name
- Ilex macrocarpa Oliv.

Synonyms
- List: Ilex dubia var. hupehensis Loes.; Ilex henryi Loes.; Ilex macrocarpa var. brevipedunculata S.Y.Hu; Ilex macrocarpa var. genuina Loes.; Ilex macrocarpa var. trichophylla Loes.; Ilex montana var. hupehensis (Loes.) Fernald; Ilex reevesiae S.Y.Hu; Celastrus salicifolius H.Lév.

Species of tree in the holly family

Ilex macrocarpa is a species of flowering plant in the holly family Aquifoliaceae, native to central and southern China, and Vietnam. A deciduous tree typically 5 to 10 m (16 to 33 ft) tall, it is found in a wide variety of temperate habitats, including roadsides, from 400 to 4,500 m (1,300 to 14,800 ft) above sea level. It differs from other hollies by its large black fruit. It is used as a street tree in Hefei, China.

== Subtaxa ==
The following varieties are accepted:

- Ilex macrocarpa var. longipedunculata S.Y.Hu – southern China
- Ilex macrocarpa var. macrocarpa – entire range
- Ilex macrocarpa var. reevesiae (S.Y.Hu) S.Y.Hu – central China
