= Alexander Roos =

British architect

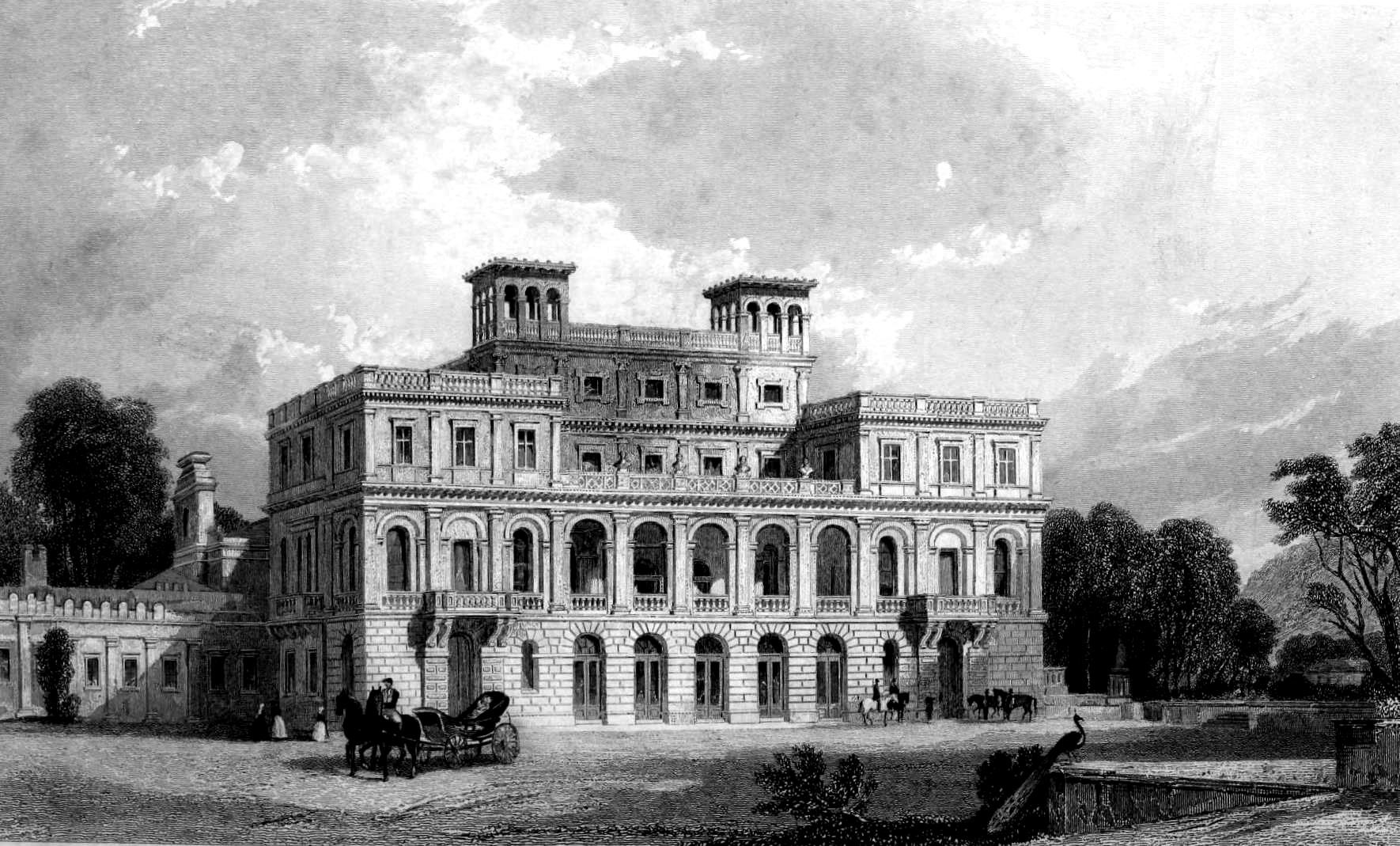
Deepdene House, Surrey (remodelled 1836–41)

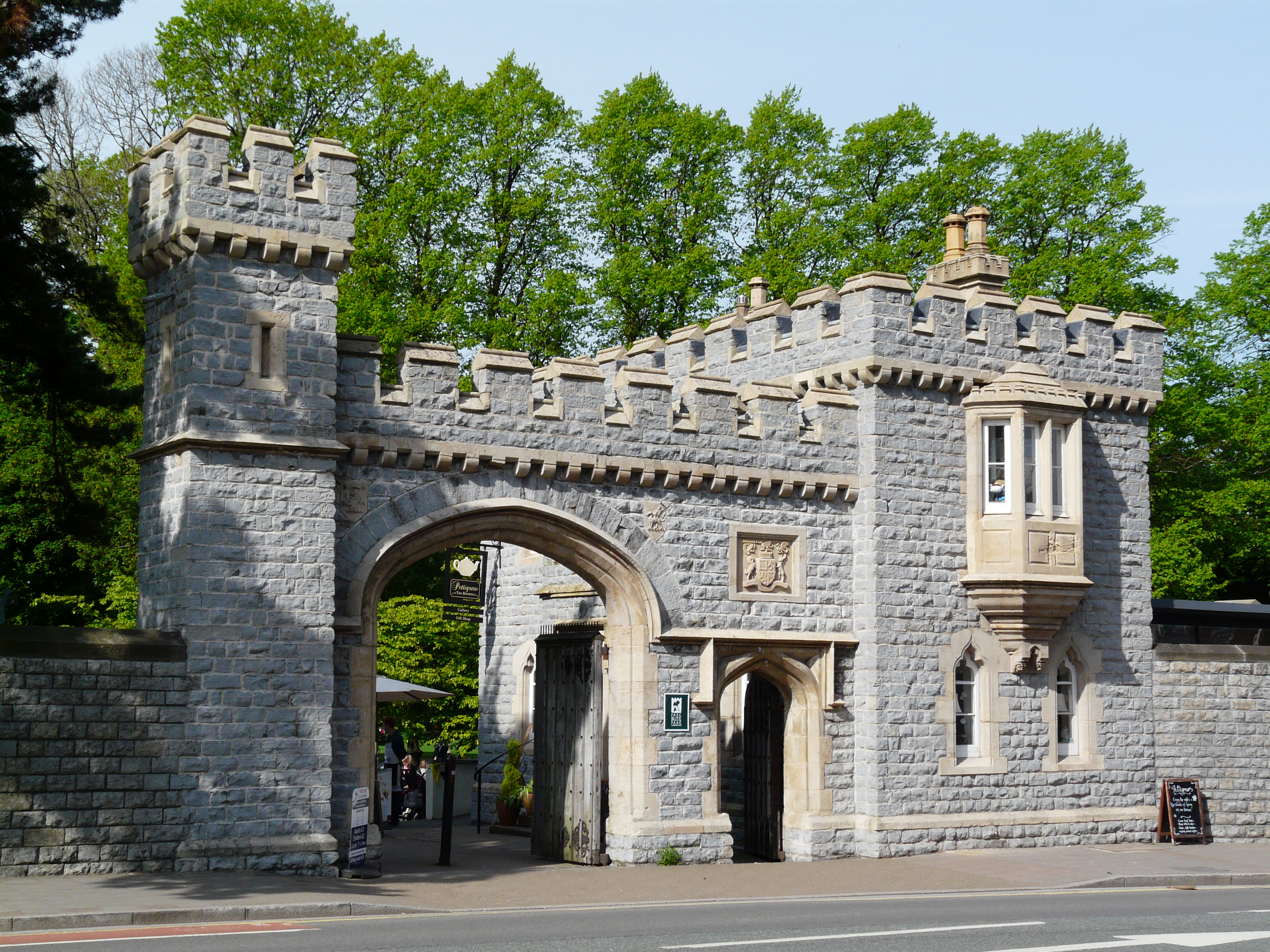
West Lodge, Cardiff Castle (1860–62)

Alexander Roos (c. 1810 – 30 June 1881) was an Italian-born British architect and urban planner. He was the architect to the Bute Estates in South Wales, for which he designed many buildings and laid out several areas of Cardiff.

== Early life ==
Alexander Roos was born in Rome in about 1810, apparently the son of Karl Roos (1776–1836), a German cabinet maker based in Rome. Alexander Roos studied architecture with Karl Friedrich Schinkel in Berlin.

== Career ==
In or before 1835 Roos made decorations for Hadzor House, Worcestershire, based on designs from Pompeii where he had previously made drawings. This work led to two major commissions: at Deepdene House in Surrey for Henry Thomas Hope, and at Bedgebury House, Kent for General William Beresford. These commissions led to a successful architectural career in Britain.

In the 1840s Roos had an extensive architectural practice in Scotland.

In 1845 the wealthy industrialist John Crichton-Stuart, Second Marquess of Bute appointed Roos as architect for his extensive estates in South Wales. Roos laid out much of Cardiff, which was expanding rapidly at the time, and designed several buildings in Cardiff. When the second marquess died in 1848 Roos became one of the two trustees managing the Bute estate on behalf of the infant John Crichton-Stuart, Third Marquess of Bute. Roos was dismissed when the third marquess came of age in 1868. It appears that Roos then retired from architecture.

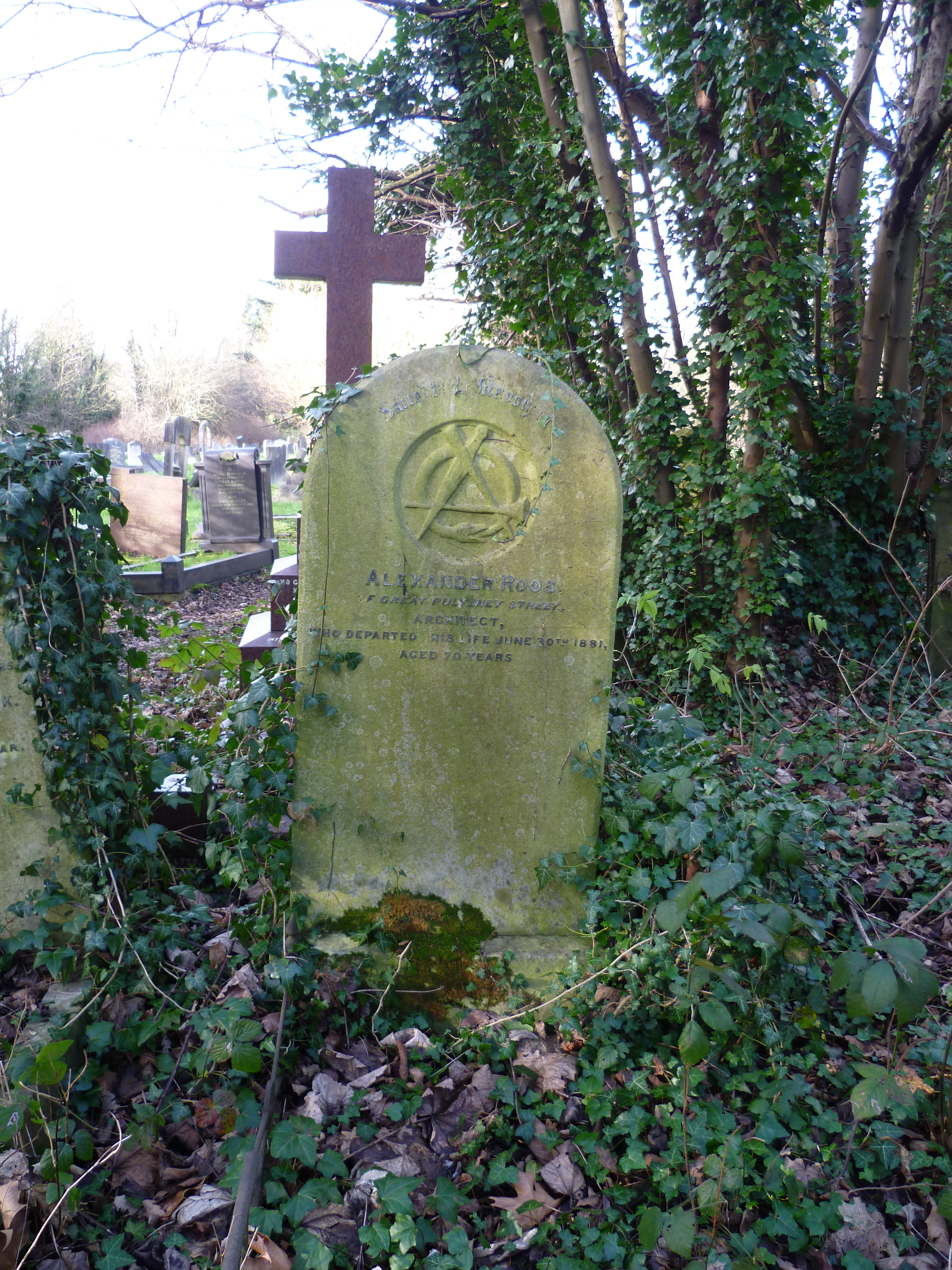
The grave of Alexander Roos at St Pancras and Islington Cemetery.

== Death ==
Roos died on 30 June 1881. He is buried at St Pancras and Islington Cemetery.

== Notable projects ==
- c. 1835, Hadzor House, Worcestershire – decorations in the style of ancient Pompeii.
- 1836–41, Deepdene House, Dorking, Surrey – Reconstruction as a Roman villa.
- 1836–41, Bedgebury House, Kent – remodelling in Italianate style.
- c. 1843, House of Falkland, Fife – chimneypieces, decorative work and parterres.
- 1843, Aldbar Castle, Angus – alterations and redecoration.
- 1845–48, urban planning, Cardiff, including layout of Cathays Park (now Cardiff Civic Centre)
- 1854, Sophia Gardens, Cardiff – design of public park.
- 1850s, Green Hill Temple (summerhouse), House of Falkland, Fife.
- 1850s, Bruce Fountain, Falkland, Fife.
- mid 1850s, Houses in Mount Stuart Square, Butetown, Cardiff
- 1858, St Lleurwg's Church Hirwaun
- 1862, St Andrew's Church, Cardiff (now Eglwys Dewi Sant) – Roos completed the design by Prichard & Seddon.
- 1860–62, West Lodge, Cardiff Castle
- 1868, St Margaret's Church, Roath, Cardiff – ground plan for rebuilding.
