= West Lodge, Cardiff Castle =

Tea rooms in Cardiff, Wales

Coordinates: 51.4812°N 3.1846°W

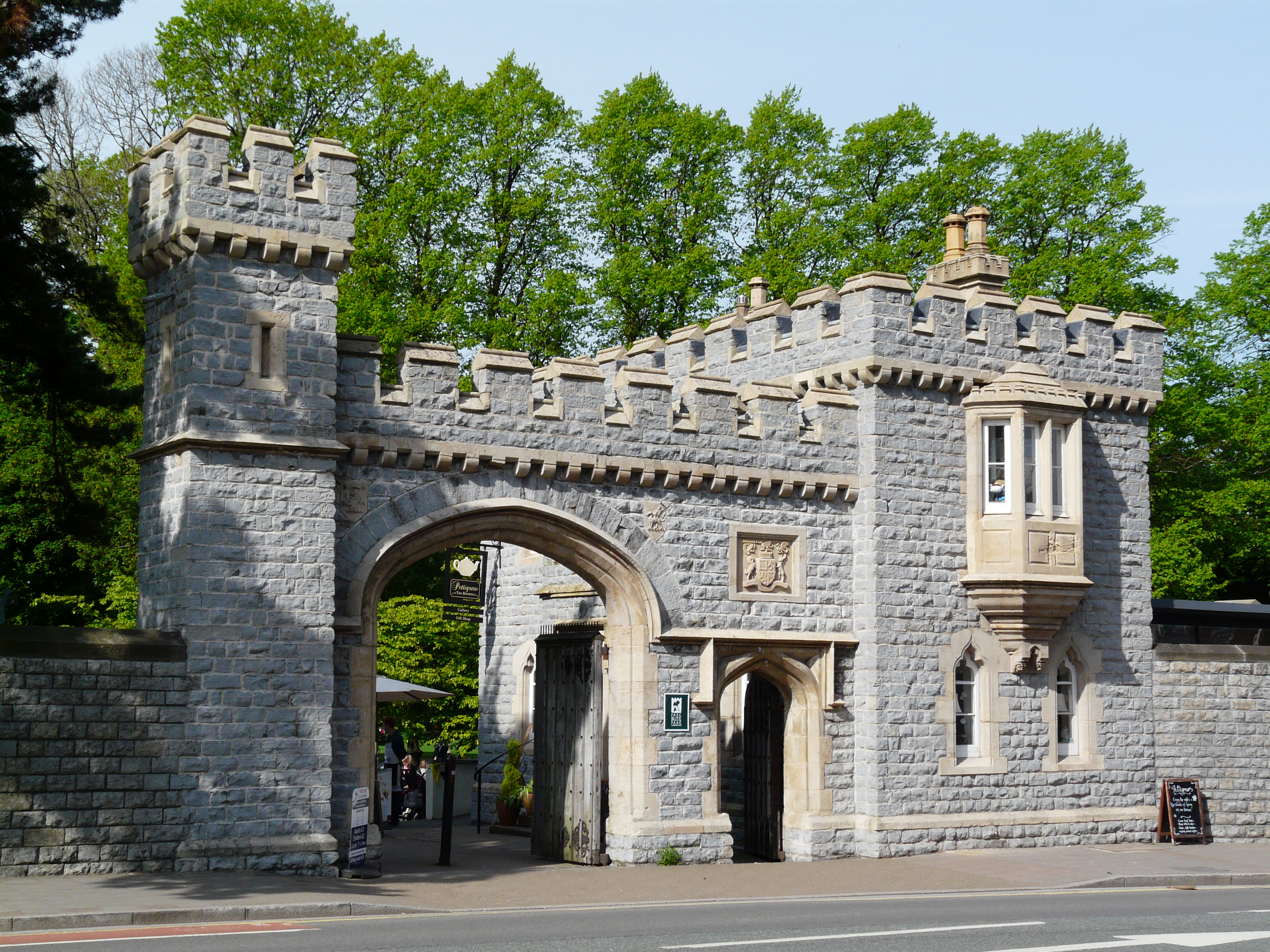
West Gate attached to the side of the castle recreated by the Bute family

The West Lodge, also known as the West Gate Lodge, to Cardiff Castle is a Grade II* listed building, currently used as a tea room, in the centre of Cardiff, Wales. It is approximately 100 metres (330 ft) west of the Castle, with the Animal Wall running in-between.

The lodge was designed by the architect Alexander Roos for John Crichton-Stuart, 3rd Marquess of Bute and built in 1860–63 to the west of Cardiff Castle as a decorative gatehouse to the Bute estate. It is located to the east of a pedestrian gateway and a much larger broad gateway with wooden gates, which are flanked to the west by a slim turret. All are built in grey stone in a Gothic style with crenellated parapets above.

The West Lodge was given a Grade II* heritage listing in 1952, being an "integral part of the development of Cardiff Castle and Bute Park" and having a group value with the nearby Animal Wall.

As part of a £5.6-million Bute Park restoration project, the West Lodge was converted into tea rooms and a gift shop in 2012. It opened to the public on 23 March with a special tile-laying ceremony. Victorian floor tiles had been laid in the tea rooms, which had been recovered from the nearby ruins of Blackfriars Friary in 1977. The West Lodge was renamed as Pettigrew Tea Rooms, after the 3rd Marquess of Bute's head gardener, Andrew Pettigrew.
