= Sophia Gardens =

Park in Cardiff, Wales

- Gerddi Sophia
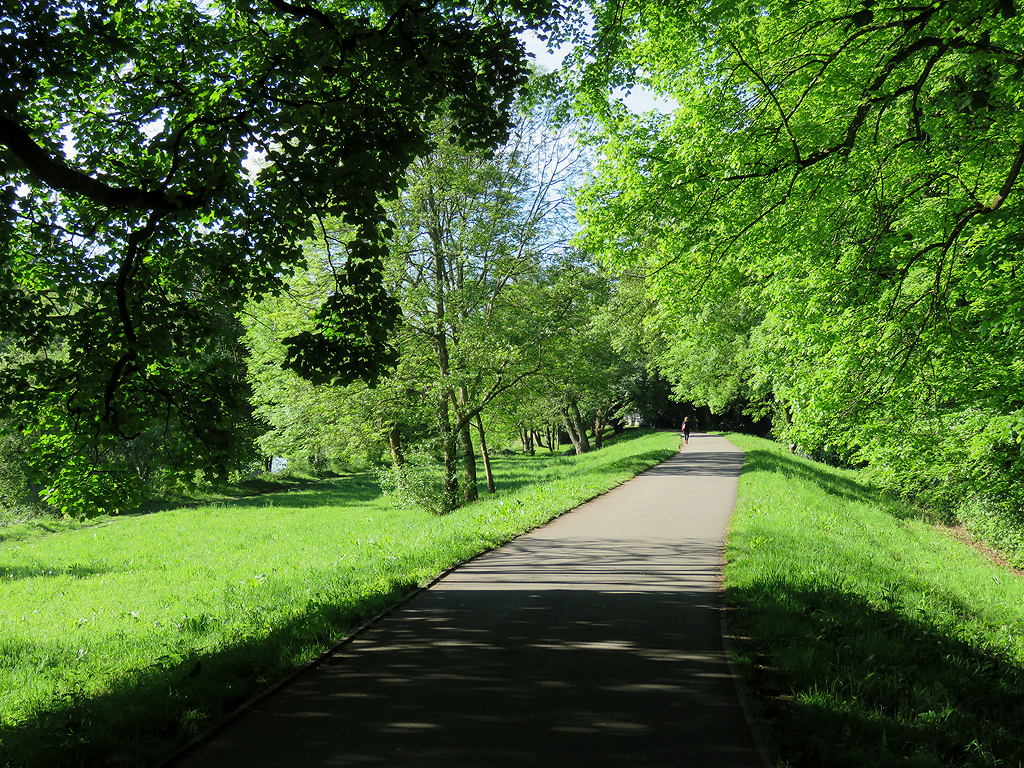
- The Taff Trail long-distance cycle path in Sophia Gardens

- Location within Cardiff
- Type: Public park
- Location: Cardiff, Wales
- Coordinates: 51°29′07″N 3°11′25″W
- Area: 44 acres (18 ha)
- Created: 1854
- Operator: Cardiff Council
- Status: Open year round
- Website: Pontcanna Fields and Sophia Gardens

Cadw/ICOMOS Register of Parks and Gardens of Special Historic Interest in Wales
- Official name: Sophia Gardens
- Designated: 1 February 2022; 4 years ago
- Reference no.: PGW(Gm)21(CDF)
- Listing: Grade II

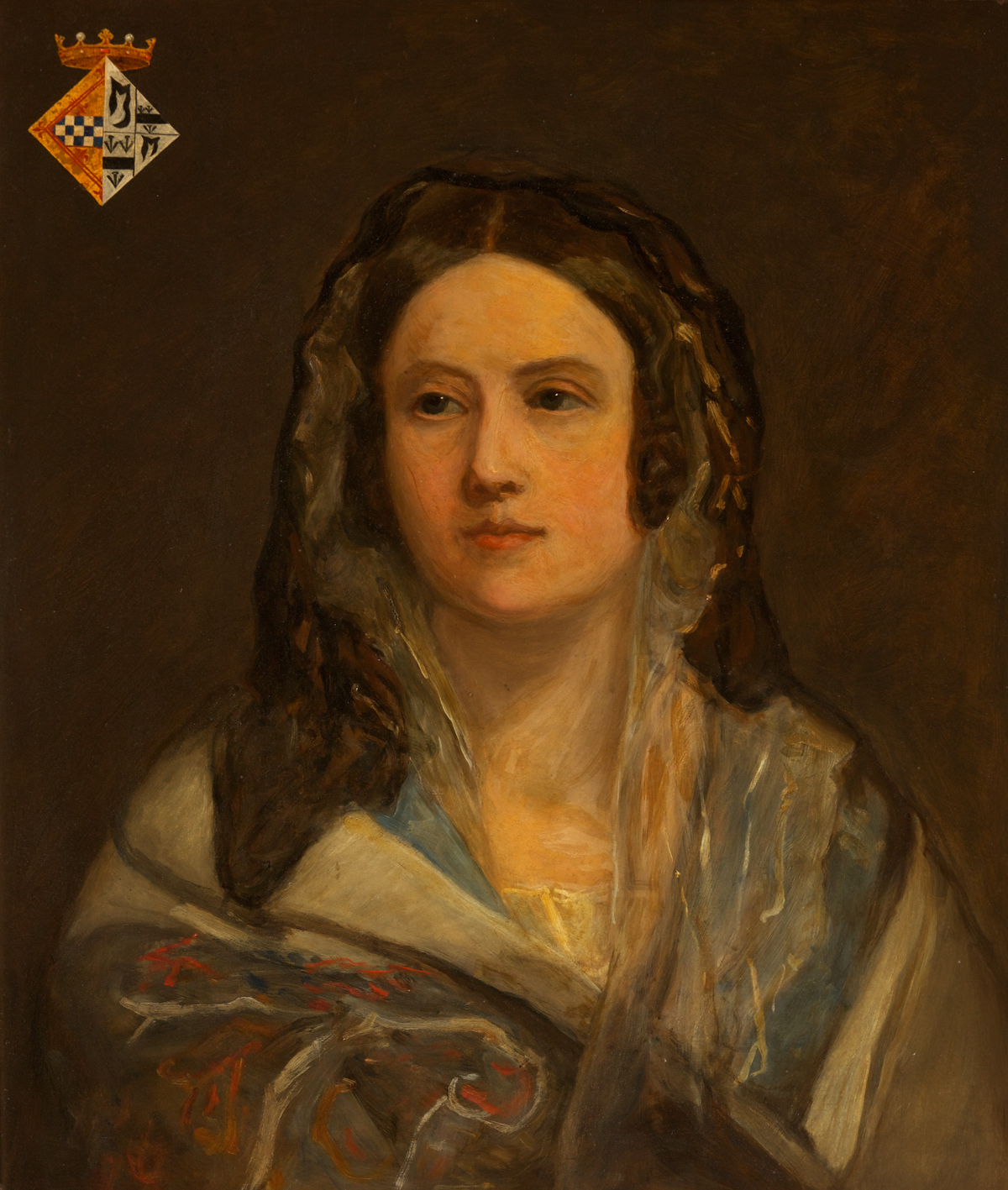
Sophia Crichton-Stuart, Marchioness of Bute, after whom the park is named

Sophia Gardens (/səˈfaɪə/ suh-FY-uh; Welsh: Gerddi Sophia) is a public park in Riverside, Cardiff, Wales, on the west bank of the River Taff. International test cricket matches and county cricket matches are held in the Sophia Gardens cricket ground, the home of Glamorgan County Cricket Club. The gardens are listed on the Cadw/ICOMOS Register of Parks and Gardens of Special Historic Interest in Wales.

Sophia Gardens is located close to Cardiff city centre and is adjacent to Bute Park and Pontcanna Fields. It is linked to Bute Park by the Millennium footbridge over the River Taff (1999). In addition to the Glamorgan County Cricket Ground, the park contains the Sport Wales National Centre, Brewhouse & Kitchen public house, an exhibition area and a car and coach park, and the former warden's house.

== History ==
The park is named after Sophia Crichton-Stuart, Marchioness of Bute (1809–1859), the widow of the second Marquess of Bute. Lady Sophia was concerned to provide open space for recreation in the rapidly expanding town in the late 19th century, in which her husband was heavily involved. The gardens were laid out in 1854 on the site of Plasturton Farm by the architect Alexander Roos. They were opened to the public by Lady Sophia in 1858, to compensate for the closure of Cardiff Castle grounds. The park was extended northwards by 28 acres in about 1879. The park was acquired by Cardiff City Council, then the Cardiff Corporation, from the 5th Marquess of Bute in 1947.

In the late 19th and early 20th century the Cardiff Horse Show was held in the park. In 1891 the park was home to Buffalo Bill's Wild West Show during his tour of British provincial towns.

Sophia Gardens Pavilion was built in 1951 for the Festival of Britain, and was used as a concert venue until it collapsed under heavy snowfall in 1982.

Following the closure of Cardiff Central bus station in 2015, National Express long-distance coach services depart and arrive at Sophia Gardens.

The gardens are designated Grade II on the Cadw/ICOMOS Register of Parks and Gardens of Special Historic Interest in Wales.

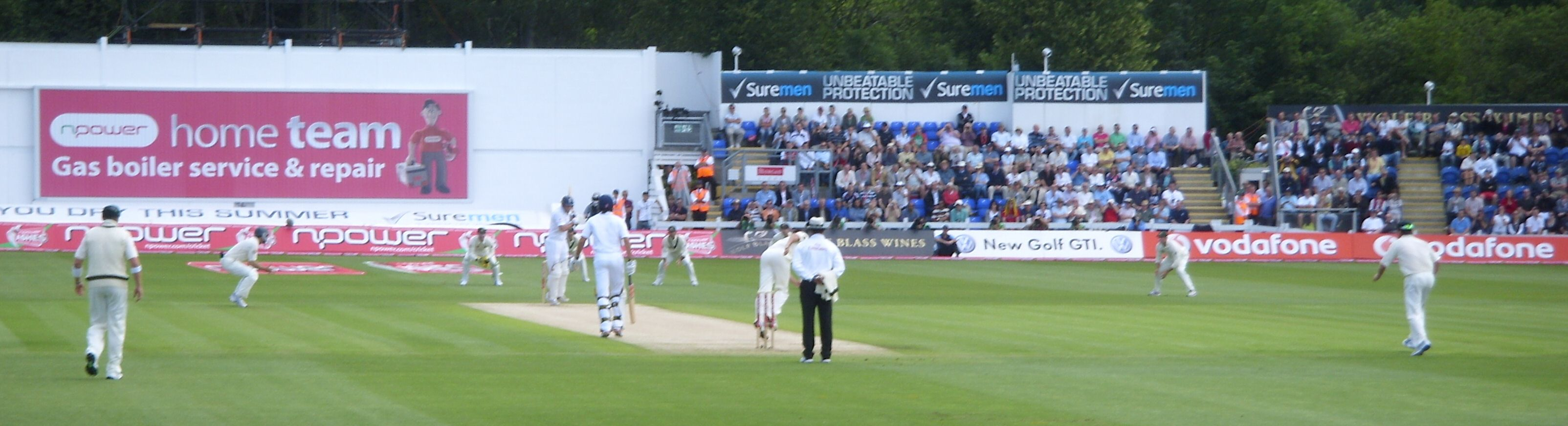
Opening ball of the 2009 Ashes series
