= Marchioness of Bute =

Marchioness of Bute is a title normally given to the wife of the Marquess of Bute. Women who have held the title include:

- Sophia Crichton-Stuart, Marchioness of Bute (1809-1859)
- Augusta Crichton-Stuart, Marchioness of Bute (1880-1947)
