= Horatio Walter Lonsdale =

English painter and designer

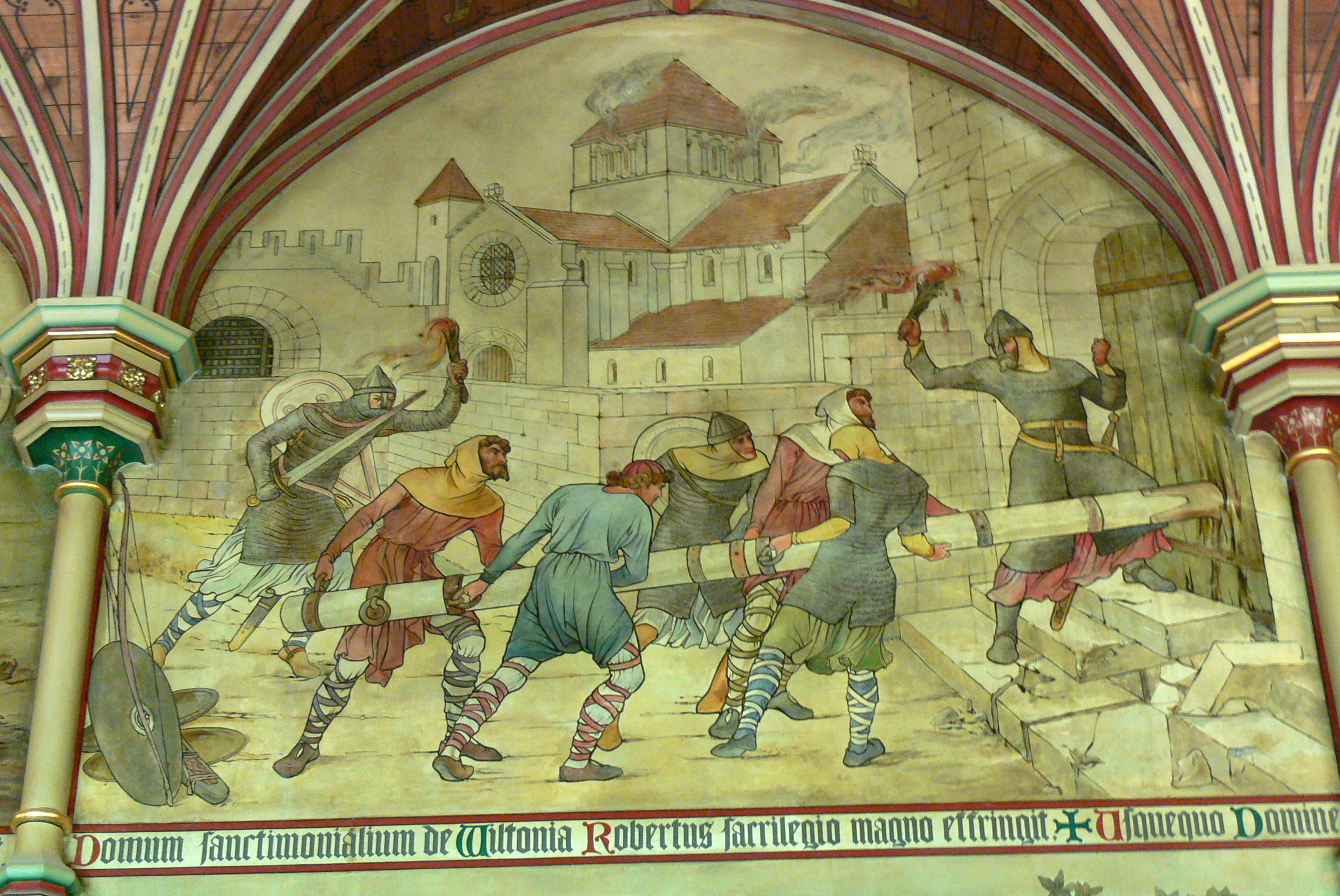
- The Banqueting Hall, Cardiff Castle, decorated by Lonsdale
- Born: 1845 or 1846; Mexico
- Died: September 8, 1919 (aged 73); London
- Notable work: Saint Fin Barre's Cathedral; Church of Christ the Consoler; Cardiff Castle; Castell Coch; Mount Stuart House

Horatio Walter Lonsdale (1845/1846 – 8 September 1919) was an English painter and designer.

== Life and works ==
Lonsdale was born in Mexico in 1845 or 1846. After training as an architect, Lonsdale established a long partnership with the architect William Burges, working with him as his principal artist on many of Burges's major commissions, including Saint Fin Barre's Cathedral, Cardiff Castle, Castell Coch and the Yorkshire churches. Lonsdale worked so closely with Burges, particularly in the design of stained glass, that "it is often hard to say how much of any given design is Burges's and how much is (Lonsdale's) — designs were often initialled by both." He also designed the zodiac windows and celestial ceiling at Mount Stuart House and the silver casket in which the heart of Burges's great patron, John Crichton-Stuart, 3rd Marquess of Bute was transported to Jerusalem for burial in 1900. (Note: Lonsdale also drew the cartoons for the frieze, dome and windows of the James A. Garfield Memorial in Cleveland, Ohio.) Burges's biographer, Joseph Mordaunt Crook, summed up Lonsdale's career; "a draughtsman of exceptional precision, his best work was all for Burges. Without the master's control, much of his later work tends to be mechanical and vapid.”

== Exhibitions ==
An exhibition of Lonsdale's work, organised by the Yale Center for British Art, was held at Gallery Lingard in 1984. In 2013/2014, an exhibition titled Searching For A New Jerusalem at the Lewis Glucksman Gallery in University College Cork presented cartoons by Lonsdale for the stained glass windows in Saint Fin Barre's Cathedral. An Irish stamp was issued in 2021 to mark the 150th anniversary of the disestablishment of the Church of Ireland in 1871. The stamp featured a detail of the cartoon by Lonsdale of the Sun, Moon and Stars panel for one of the stained glass windows in Saint Fin Barre's Cathedral. A collection of Lonsdale illustrations and cartoons, for the decoration of Mount Stuart House on the Isle of Bute where it is held, was catalogued in 2022. In the same year, an exhibition held at the house, Fantasy to Fabrication: 19th century design at Mount Stuart, included examples of Lonsdale's art. Lonsdale was a member of the Royal Academy.

== Gallery ==
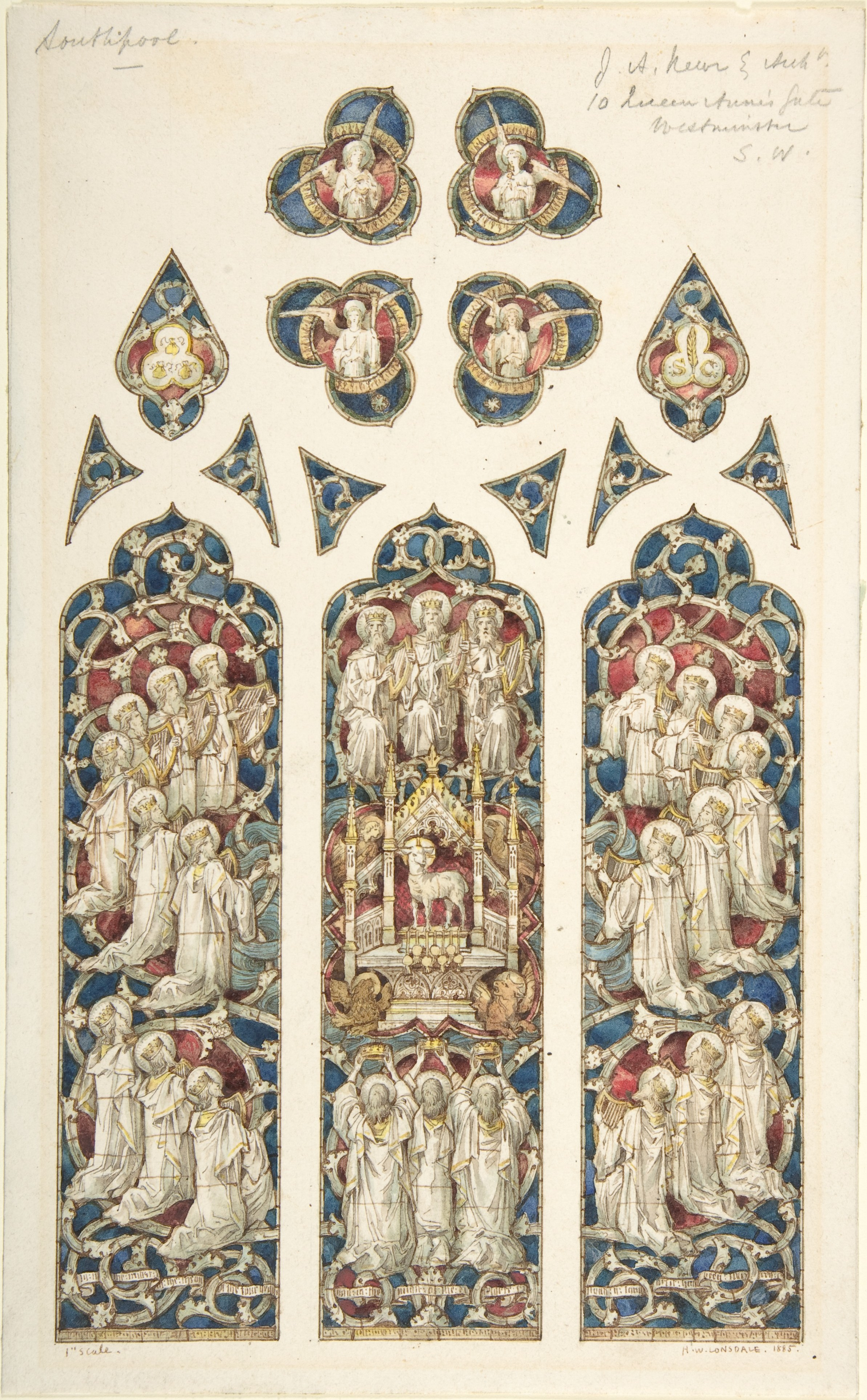
Design for stained glass in St Nicholas and St Cyriacus, South Pool, Devon (1885). Now in the Metropolitan Museum of Art

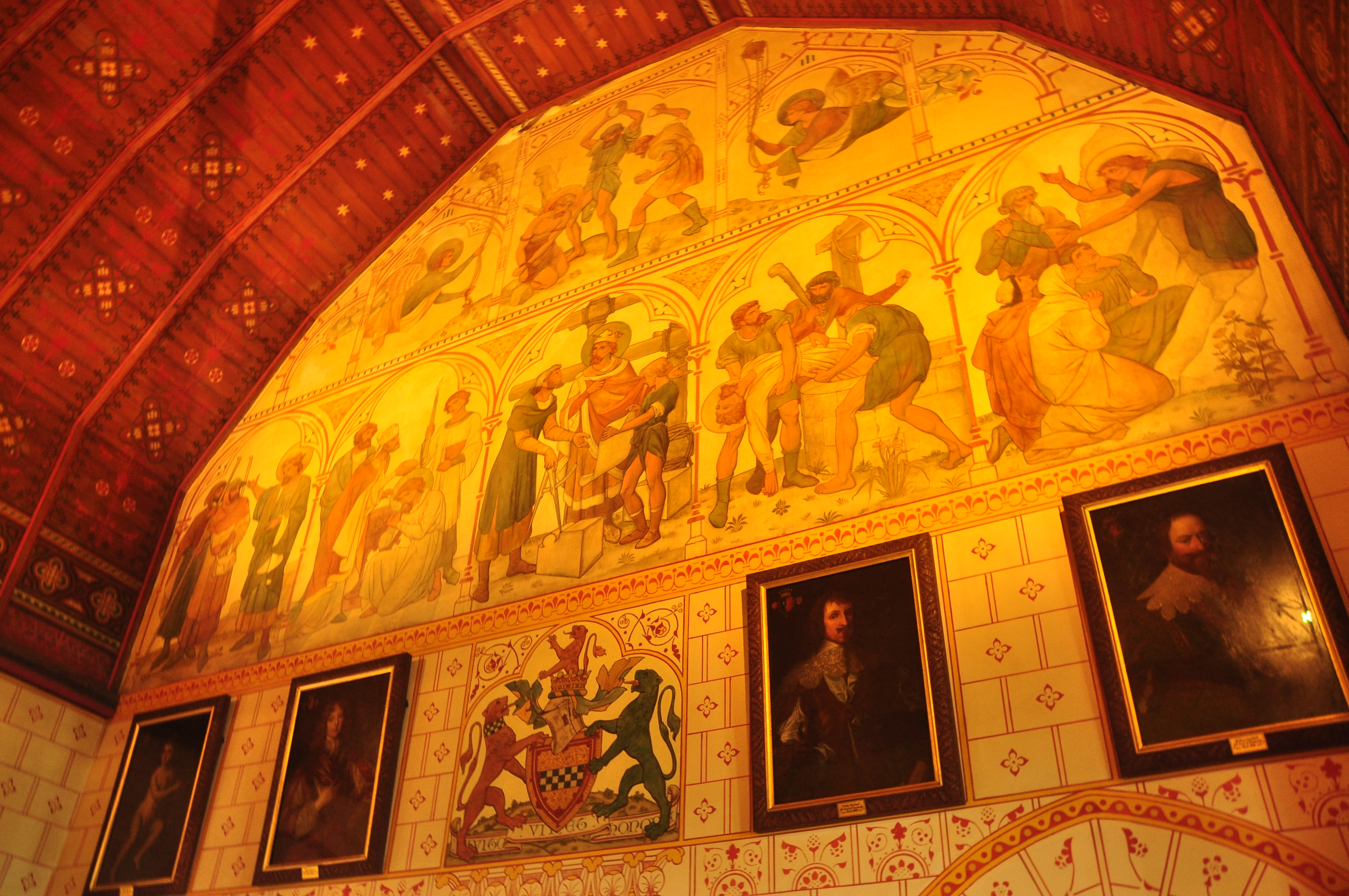
Banqueting Hall at Castell Coch, Wales

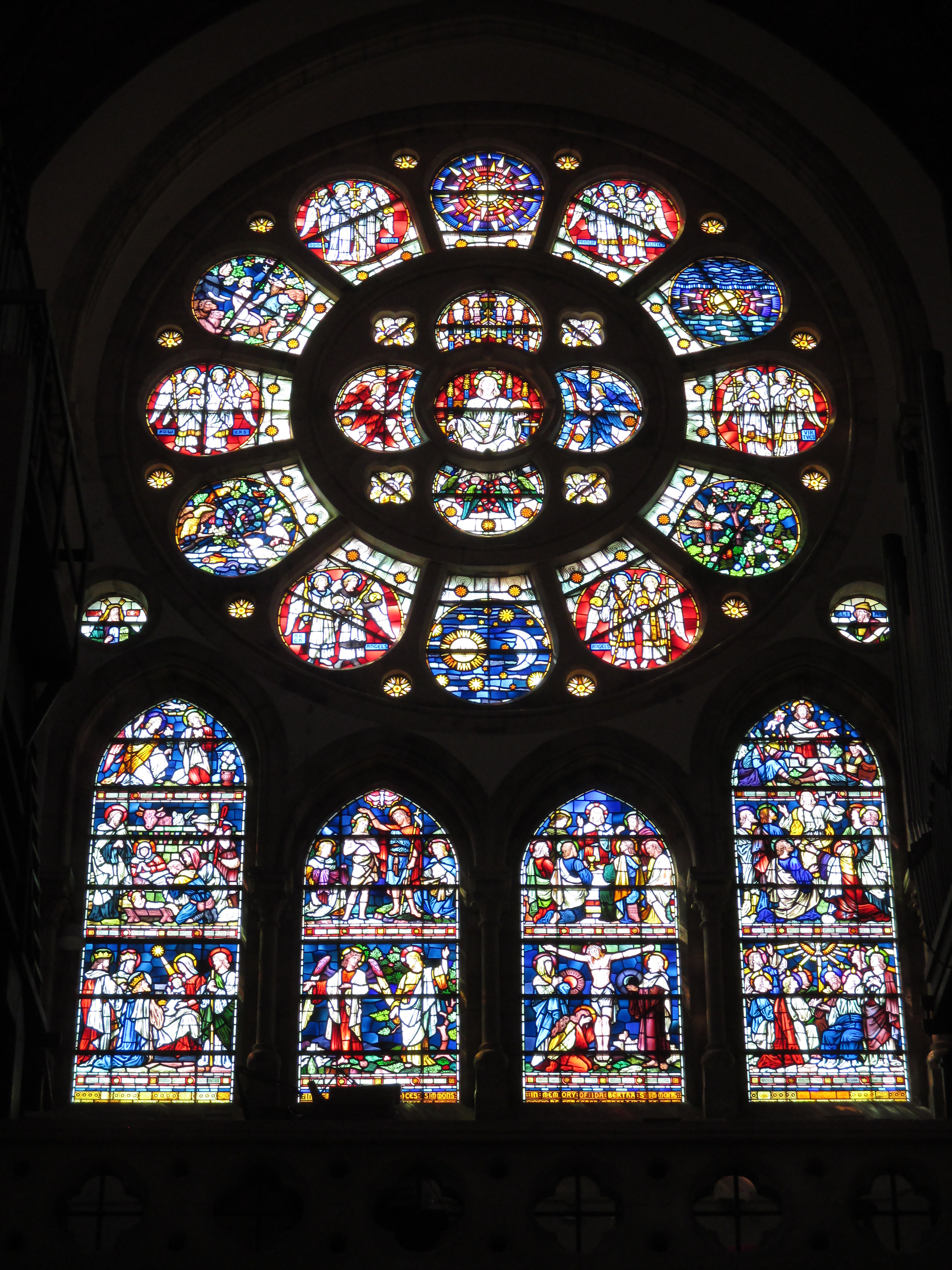
West window of St Michael's Church, Brighton (1895)

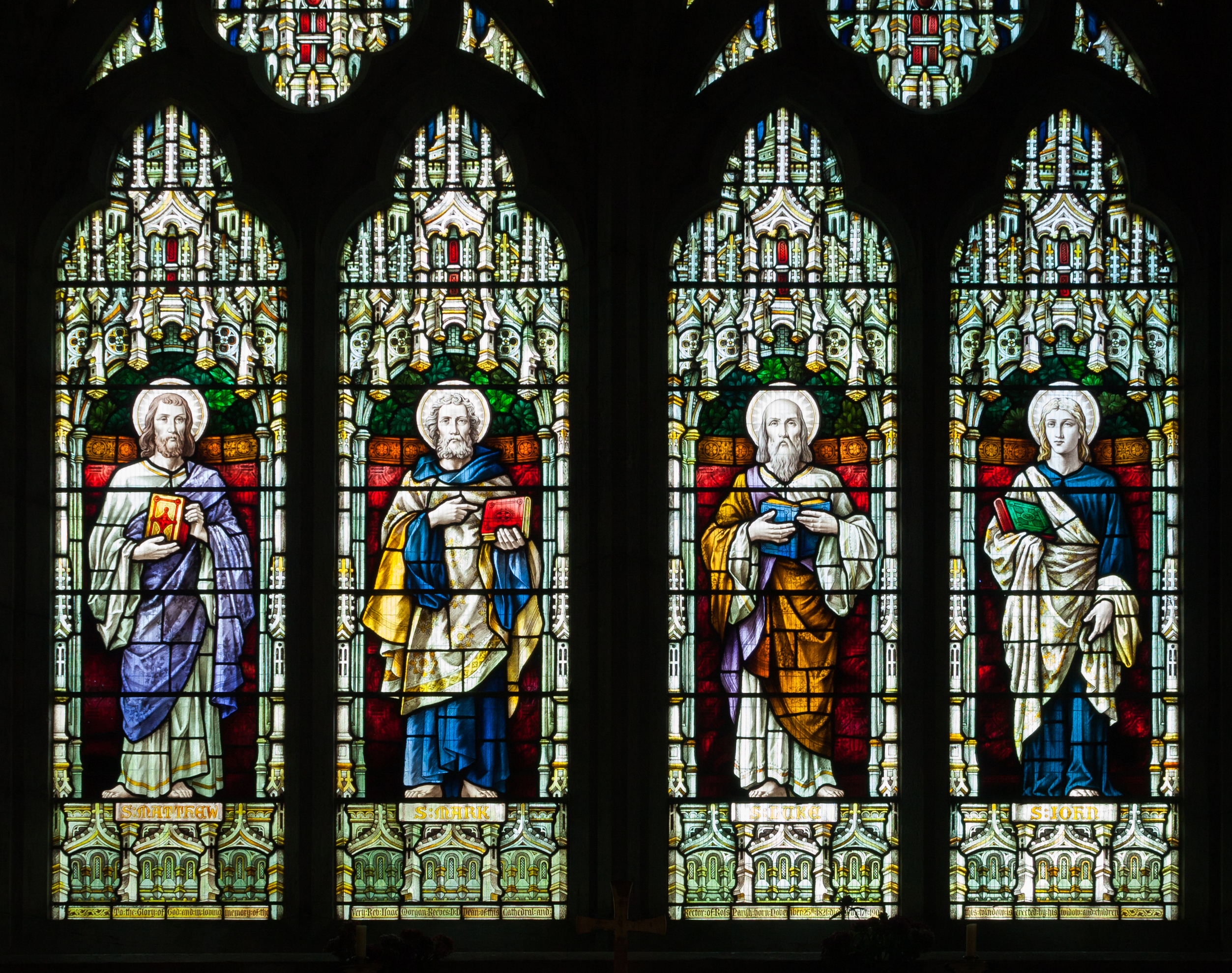
Stained glass in the East window of St Fachtna's Cathedral, Rosscarbery, Ireland (1907)

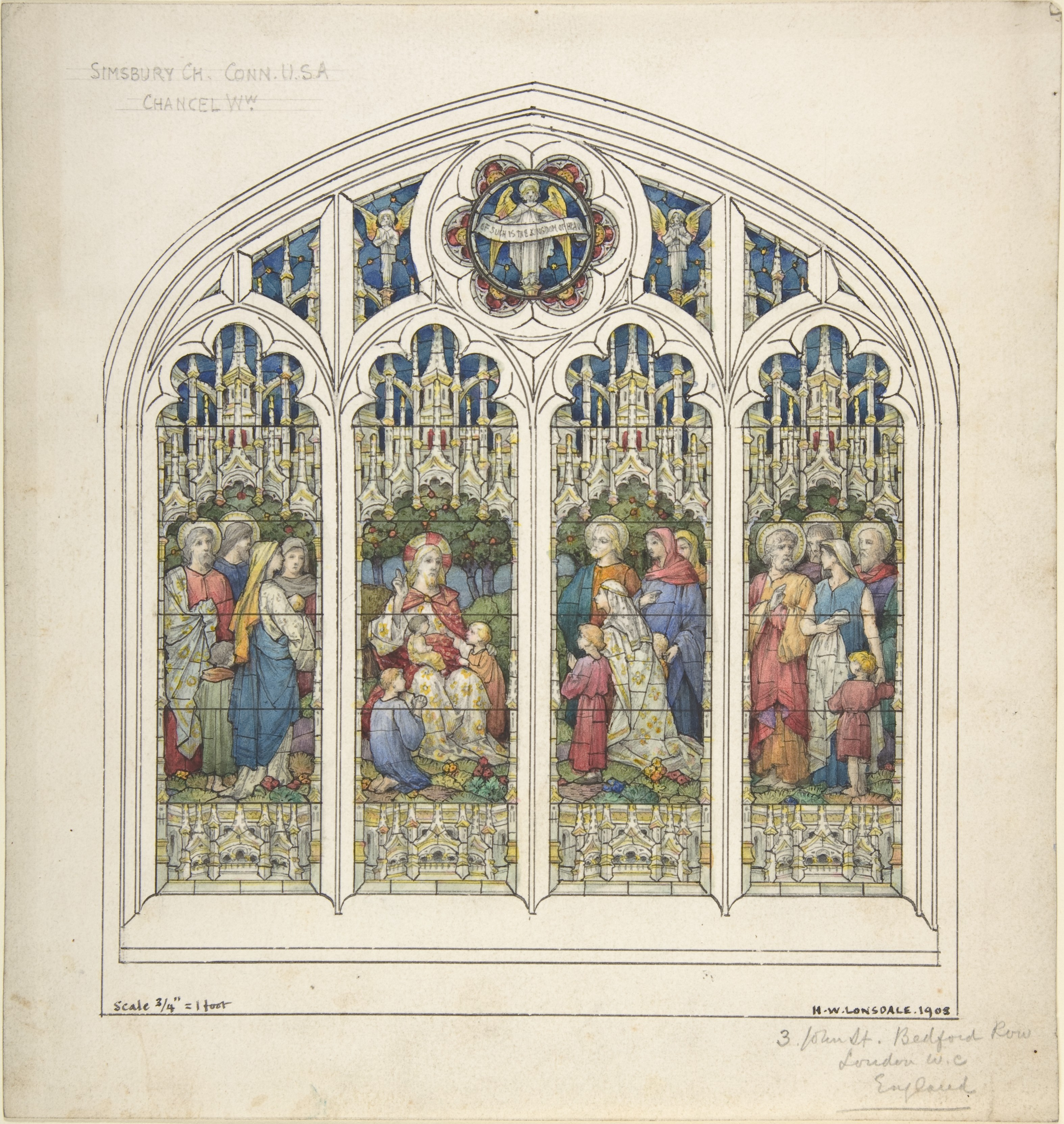
Design for stained glass for a church in Simsbury, Connecticut (1908). Now in the Metropolitan Museum of Art

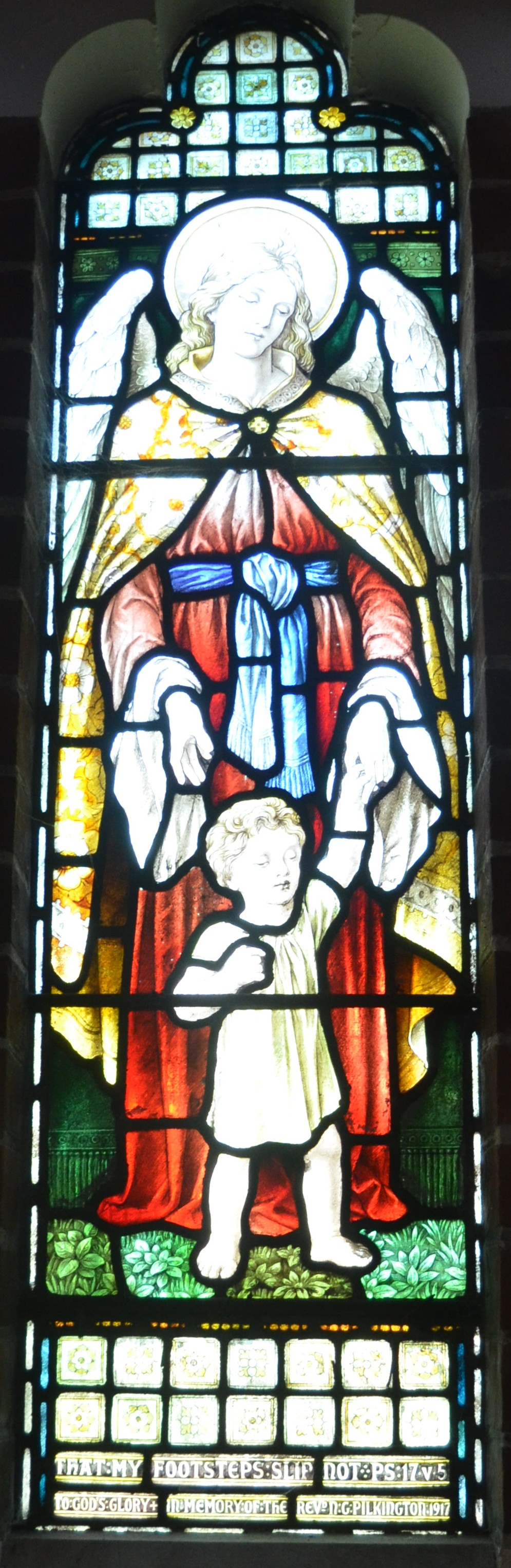
The second light of the west window of St Matthias' Church, Brighton (1917)

== Sources ==
- Crook, J. Mordaunt (2013). William Burges and the High Victorian Dream. London, UK: Frances Lincoln. ISBN 978-0-7112-3349-2.
- Hannah, Rosemary (2012). The Grand Designer: Third Marquess of Bute. Birlinn. ISBN 9781780270272.
- Walker, Frank Arneil (2000). Argyll and Bute. The Buildings of Scotland. New Haven, CT and London: Yale University Press. ISBN 9780300096705.
