= Re Cardiff Savings Bank =

UK company law case

Re Cardiff Savings Bank [1892] 2 Ch 100, often called the Marquess of Bute's case is a UK company law case concerning the duty of care owed by members of the board. It is old law but is still often mentioned as an extreme example of to what extent a "subjective" duty of care (as opposed to an objective duty of care under the modern law, see Re D'Jan of London Ltd and section 174 of the Companies Act 2006) allowed directors to escape consequences of their negligence.

The court held that there was no breach of duty of care for failing to attend bank meetings. It is unlikely in modern corporate law that the decision would have been reached on the facts.

== Facts ==
The Marquess of Bute as an infant of six months was installed in 1848 on the board of directors as "President" of the Cardiff Savings Bank and in effect inherited the office from his father. The company was plunged into insolvency in 1886 when Lord Bute was 38 years old. He had been to a board meeting when he was 21, in 1868, and apparently signed the minutes, but he was generally ignorant of the company's affairs. The company went insolvent because the directors defrauded the company of large sums of money. The liquidator wanted Lord Bute to make a contribution for the losses.

== Judgment ==
Stirling J held that the duty owed by Lord Bute was essentially to be determined by the knowledge and capability of the director himself. Lord Bute was not liable because he was entitled to rely on the other directors to have done their own jobs and there was no extra duty on him to oversee that:

"It was proved in Davies's Case 45 Ch. D. 537, that irregularities have occurred in the management of the bank in the following, amongst other, particulars:— (1.) Transactions of deposit and repayment took place without the presence of a trustee or manager in addition to the paid officer as required by sect.6, sub-sect.2, of the Trustee Savings Banks Act, 1863. (2.) No list of the depositors' balances was for some years prior to the stoppage extracted, or checked, or certified by the auditors, or kept open for the inspection of every depositor as regarded his own account, as required by sect. 6, sub-sect. 6, of the same Act. In Davies's Case knowledge of these irregularities was brought home to Davies . The Marquis of Bute was, in fact, ignorant of them. The question which I have to decide is whether he is, notwithstanding, liable for the loss which has arisen from them. It was in the first place contended on behalf of the Marquis that although he was president of the bank, his position was that of a mere figurehead, without any real power in the management of the business or any responsibility for its results. This contention is based on the language of the rules. Rule 1 provides as follows:

“The affairs of this institution shall be conducted by one president, seventeen trustees, and thirty-seven managers, who shall have power to fill up any vacancies which may occur in their number and to appoint a treasurer.”

Thenceforward, in the rules, the president is not mentioned, the “trustees and managers” are alone spoken of, and it is said that on the true construction of the rules these words do not include the president, whose functions on this view would be confined to taking part in filling up vacancies and appointing a treasurer. This seems to me too narrow a construction of the rules; but I think it unnecessary to decide the question; I assume that the president is to be regarded as one of the trustees and managers. This being so, it is urged that the Marquis is relieved from liability by sect. 11 of the Act of 1863.

On the other hand, the liquidator contends that the Marquis is liable for neglect or omission in complying with the regulations contained in the Act as to the maintenance of checks and the audit and examination of accounts. Sect. 11 appears to be intended to impose on each individual trustee or manager liability for his own acts and defaults, not liability for the acts or defaults of his co-trustees or co-managers. This was, to some extent at least, admitted in argument. If, for example, the trustee or manager chosen to be present along with the paid officer on an occasion of public business failed to perform his duty, it was conceded (and I think properly conceded) by the Attorney-General that the other trustees and managers (not being parties to such breach of duty) would not be liable for it. It was said, however, that on all trustees and managers alike there lay an obligation to see that the statutory provisions as to examination and audit of accounts, and particularly as to the preparation and examination of an extracted list of depositors, and the keeping such list open for the inspection of depositors, were duly complied with, and that in this respect the Marquis of Bute was guilty of neglect or omission. The trustees and managers of the Cardiff Savings Bank were (including the president) fifty-five in number. It could not be expected that each member of so numerous a body should take a very active part in the management, or attend every meeting. The directors of a trading company are only bound to use fair and reasonable diligence in the management of their company's affairs: see In re Forest of Dean Coal Mining Company 10 Ch. D. 450, 452.

In the case of In re Denham & Co. 25 Ch. D. 752, a director who for four years had attended no board meetings was held not to be personally answerable for fraudulent reports and balance sheets issued and passed by his co-directors or the dividends paid under them. The standard of duty for an unpaid trustee or manager of a savings bank under the Act of 1863 cannot, I think, be placed higher than that of a director of a trading company, who usually receives remuneration and is a member of a much smaller body. Here the Marquis of Bute took no part in the conduct of the business of the bank. It may be that he neglected, as he certainly omitted, to attend the meetings to which he was summoned. But neglect or omission to attend meetings is not, in my opinion, the same thing as neglect or omission of a duty which ought to be performed at those meetings. If, indeed, he had had knowledge or notice either that no meetings of trustees or managers were being held, or that a duty which ought to be discharged at those meetings was not being performed, it might be right to hold that he was guilty of neglect or omission of the duty. That, however, is not this case. The Marquis is to be treated as having received the circulars inviting him to attend the annual meetings, and the reports issued by the bank, but not as being in a worse plight than if he had read them. Two of these reports have been put in evidence. Both refer to the accounts of the actuary (the paid officer of the bank) as having been duly audited and found correct; both record votes of thanks to trustees and managers for their attendance at the bank on days on which, according to the rules, it was to be open for receipts and payments. Any person reading these documents would naturally be led to believe that the affairs of the bank were being conducted in conformity with the rules, and in particular that the accounts were duly audited. It was part of the auditors' duty to examine an extracted list of the depositors' balances made up every year to the 20th of November, and to certify its correctness (see sect. 6, sub-sects. 6 and 7, of the Act of 1863); and no person reading these reports could suppose that that duty had not been duly performed.

I think that the Marquis was entitled to rely on the trustees and managers who took part in these meetings seeing that the list was duly extracted, certified, and made available for the inspection of the depositors; just as each trustee and manager would be entitled to rely on the due performance of his duty by that one of their number who was present along with the paid officer on an occasion of public business. To hold that the Marquis was guilty of neglect or omission in respect of this duty, in the absence of any knowledge or notice that it was not duly performed, would, in my opinion, be to fix him with liability for the neglect and omission of others rather than his own. It was much pressed on me that, if this be so, all the trustees and managers might abstain from acting, leaving the business to be transacted by the officers of the bank alone, and yet escape liability. I have difficulty in seeing how this could happen without the knowledge of some at least of the trustees and managers. However this may be, it is not the present case. The affairs of the bank were, in fact, managed by some of the trustees and managers; and I do not think it necessary to inquire how matters would have stood if no trustee or manager had taken part in the conduct of the business. In my opinion, therefore, the application fails.
