= Llanilid =

Coordinates: 51.523048°N 3.473703°W

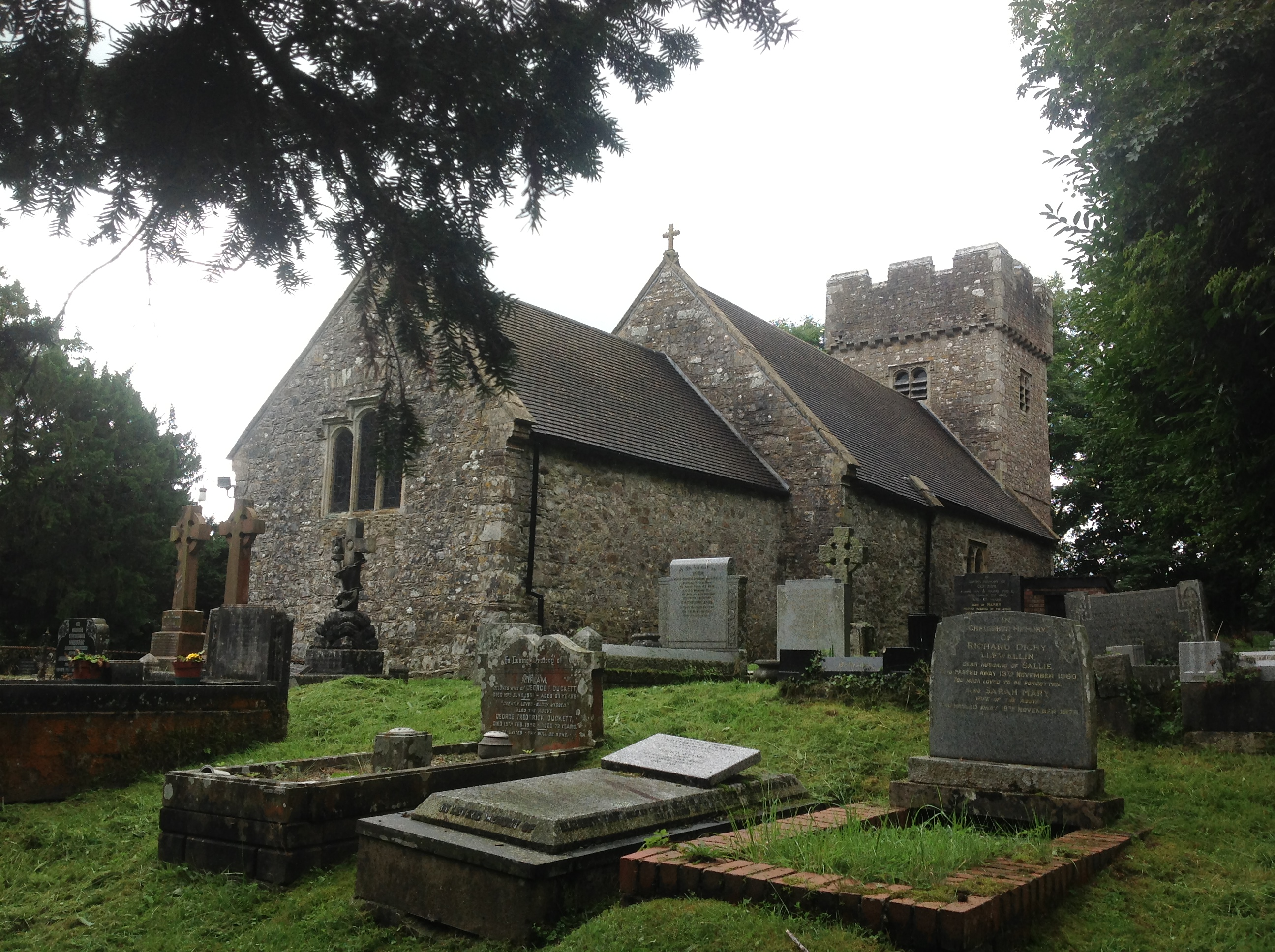
- The church of St Ilid & St Curig

- Location within Rhondda Cynon Taf
- OS grid reference: SS978814
- Principal area: Rhondda Cynon Taf
- Preserved county: Mid Glamorgan
- Country: Wales
- Sovereign state: United Kingdom
- Post town: Pontyclun
- Postcode district: CF72
- Dialling code: 01443
- Police: South Wales
- Fire: South Wales
- Ambulance: Welsh
- UK Parliament: Pontypridd
- Senedd Cymru – Welsh Parliament: Ogmore

Llanilid is a small settlement of in the county borough of Rhondda Cynon Taf, Wales. It is in the historic county of Glamorgan. Llanilid is part of the community of Llanharan along with the villages of Bryncae, Brynna, Ynysmaerdy, Peterston-super-Montem and Llanharan itself.

== History ==
Since the time of the Norman Conquest Llanilid and neighbouring Llanharan were part of the Welsh lordship of Ruthin, one of the lordships of Glamorgan in the cantref of Penychen. The region was wild and heavily wooded, consisting of scattered hamlets in the clearings and the land was predominantly taken to pastoralism. Tradition states that Rhys ap Jestyn was granted lordship of the region by the Normans, but there is little historical proof of this. It is known that the Normans left the region fairly untouched, though the motte in Llanilid, believed to be Norman in construct, show evidence of encroachment into the area. Eventually the lordship of Ruthin was partitioned, and by 1245 Richard Seward of the neighbouring lordship of Talyfan had wrested the region of Ruthin away from its Welsh rulers. In 1245 Ruthin, along with Talyfan and Llanblethian, were confiscated by Richard de Clare.

Little is known of the early history of Llanilid after the end of Norman control, though it is known the region boasted an ancient church, a smithy and several displaced small holdings. Most of the farms dealt with livestock, with only the western area of Llanilid, in modern times known as Felindre, possessing fertile land. This portion of Llanilid was given over to the Knights of St. John before 1338 and was known as the manor of Milton. The manor of Milton was the chief possession of the Knight of St. John within Glamorgan and its primary form of income for the order was a water mill which sat on the banks of the River Ewenny. This demesne and the mill was let and its oversight entrusted to a separate seneschal. When the order was dissolved in 1540, Milton was purchased by John Thomas Bassett of Bonvilston. Around this time, Llanilid had a population of around a hundred people whose land was controlled by absentee landlords. By 1666 three land owners, Humphrey Wyndham of Dunraven, Sir Robert Thomas of Llanmihangel and David Jenkins of Hensol, owned most of the parish.

Llanilid remained a rural parish throughout the 18th and 19th century, though with the coming of the industrialisation of South Wales its northern border was transformed by a large opencast mine. In 1848 Sophia Crichton-Stuart, Marchioness of Bute, wrote to her land agent, expressing concern at the actions of the Earl of Cottenham, then Lord Chancellor, who had the patronage of the parish, "where hardly anyone speaks English", for appointing as rector "a man without Welsh". Despite the changes, the hamlet saw little growth or additional housing and in 1961 the population was 95.

== Etymology ==
According to Thomas Morgan, Llanilid follows the tradition of Welsh place names attached to a parish in taking its title from the dedicated saint of the local church. In Llanilid the local church is St. Ilid & St Curig's church, and Morgan states that this relates to Ilid a person who introduced Wales to Christianity in the 1st century. This research may be connected to that of famed literary forger Iolo Morganwg, who produced elaborate tales of Ilid going as far as stating that it was the Welsh names of Joseph of Arimathea. Morgan relates that "Llan" – "Ilid", refers to the 'parish of St Ilid'. This is challenged by R.W.D. Fenn, who, after studying the Book of Llandaff and Nennius's Historia Brittonum writes in 1962 that the Latin equivalent of Ilid represents the name of a district, similar to Llandovery, and not a person. Fenn then writes that in 1566 Llanilid was dedicated to Ilid and Curig, whom he connects to the saints more commonly known in Christian tradition as Julietta and Quiricus. He links this through the Appendix of the Book of Llandaff which states that the church at Llanilid is first given as the 'Church of St Julitta'.

== Major landmarks ==
With a sparse population and made up mainly of farm houses, Llanilid still contains several buildings and structures of note. Arguably the oldest recognised structure in Llanilid is the Castle ringwork datable to the 12th century. The ringwork and raised motte, which is roughly circular, are described as one of the best preserved in Glamorgan and contains a visible bank and ditch. It is classed as a Scheduled Ancient Monument and comes under the care of Cadw, but it is not one of its protected sites. To the ringwork's immediate south-west sits St. Ilid & St Curig's church. The origin of the church is unknown, but the lower foundation stones are ancient in origin, believed to be pre-Norman Conquest. The rebuild date is unknown but architectural historians, such as John Newman, find comparisons in the design of Ruperra Castle (1626); also the south wall contains two light Tudor windows. The square tower has corbelled battlements with two-light Tudor bell-openings, though these are described as being later than the original design. John Prichard, whose work on Llandaff Cathedral saw him work on many buildings of the Diocese of Llandaff, of which St Ilid and St Cruig's belongs, 'refixed' the chancel roof in its original style, but new-roofed the nave. This work was completed around 1881 after a sum of £380 was found to repair the building from its then ruinous state. The font appears to have been taken from an earlier building, dated as 13th century.

In 2005, work started on a major film studio on the northern borders of Llanilid, named Dragon International Film Studios. The £330m development saw its first major international film, Ironclad released in 2009.

== Bibliography ==
- Davies, John; Jenkins, Nigel; Menna, Baines; Lynch, Peredur I., eds. (2008). The Welsh Academy Encyclopaedia of Wales. Cardiff: University of Wales Press. ISBN 978-0-7083-1953-6.
- Francis, David J. (1971). "A brief account of three parishes". In Stewart Williams (ed.). Glamorgan Historian. Vol. VII. Cowbridge: D Brown and sons.
- Witts, T.J. (1988). The Forgotten Years, Volume 2; a history of Llanharan and district. Llanharan: Diary Publishing. ISBN 1-871691-00-1.
- Royal Commission on Ancient and Historical Monuments in Wales (1976). An Inventory of the Ancient Monuments in Glamorgan. Royal Commission on Ancient and Historical Monuments in Wales. ISBN 9780117011410.
