= Re D'Jan of London Ltd =

Re D’Jan of London Ltd
- Court: High Court of Justice; Chancery Division, Companies Court
- Citation: [1994] 1 BCLC 561, [1993] BCC 646

Court membership
- Judge sitting: Hoffmann LJ

Keywords
- Directors' duties, Duty of care and skill

Re D’Jan of London Ltd [1994] 1 BCLC 561 is a leading English company law case concerning a director's duty of care and skill, whose main precedent is now codified under Section 174 of the Companies Act 2006. The case was decided under the older Companies Act 1985.

== Facts ==
Without reading it, Mr D'Jan signed a change to an insurance policy which was erroneously filled out by his insurance broker, a Mr Tarik Shenyuz. He did not read it before he signed, and it contained a mistake, which was that the answer 'no' was given to the question of whether in the past he had 'been director of any company which went into liquidation'. That meant the insurance company, Guardian Royal Exchange Assurance plc, could refuse to pay up when a fire at the company’s Cornwall premises destroyed £174,000 of stock. The company had gone into insolvent liquidation by the time that Mr D'Jan had realised that the form had been incorrectly completed. The liquidators sued Mr D'Jan to recoup the lost funds on behalf of the company's creditors (who together were owed £500,000). They alleged both negligence and misfeasance under s 212 of the Insolvency Act 1986.

== Judgment ==
Hoffmann LJ, sitting as a judge of first instance, held that failing even to read the form was negligent even though it may be common practice, but Mr D'Jan's liability should be reduced because as majority shareholder and debtor it was primarily his own money that he risked, rather than other people's. The duty of care owed by directors in Section 214 of the Insolvency Act 1986 was an accurate statement of the common law duty also (now codified in Section 174 of the Companies Act 2006). Because Mr D'Jan held 99 shares and his wife 1 out of the 100, Mr D'Jan pleaded that in accordance with the principle of the Multinational Gas and Petrochemical Co v Multinational Gas and Petrochemical Services Ltd, that shareholders acting by consensus bind the company's actions, his actions were ratified by the company and he should not be liable. Hoffmann LJ held that actual ratification is required, not just a likelihood that shareholders would ratify. However, owning 99 shares was relevant to the court's exercise of discretion to relieve directors for breaches of duty under section 727 of the Companies Act 1985 (now section 1157 of the Companies Act 2006) because it 'may be reasonable to take a risk in relation to your own money which would be unreasonable in relation to someone else's'. His judgment went as follows.

Both Mr D'Jan and Mr Shenyuz are highly intelligent men who gave their evidence with confidence and the conflict is not easy to resolve. But I prefer the evidence of Mr D'Jan. He did not strike me as a man who would fill in his own forms. I think he would have wanted Mr Shenyuz to earn his commission by attending to these matters and I accept that he signed in the expectation that Mr Shenyuz would have completed the form correctly.

Nevertheless I think that in failing even to read the form, Mr D'Jan was negligent. Mr Russen said that the standard of care which directors owe to their companies is not very exacting and signing forms without reading them is something a busy director might reasonably do. I accept that in real life, this often happens. But that does not mean that it is not negligent. People often take risks in circumstances in which it was not necessary or reasonable to do so. If the risk materialises, they may have to pay a penalty. I do not say that a director must always read the whole of every document which he signs. If he signs an agreement running to 60 pages of turgid legal prose on the assurance of his solicitor that it accurately reflects the board's instructions, he may well be excused from reading it all himself. But this was an extremely simple document asking a few questions which Mr D'Jan was the best person to answer. By signing the form, he accepted that he was the person who should take responsibility for its contents. In my view, the duty of care owed by a director at common law is accurately stated in sec. 214(4) of the Insolvency Act 1986. It is the conduct of:

“… a reasonably diligent person having both-

(a) the general knowledge, skill and experience that may reasonably be expected of a person carrying out the same functions as are carried out by that director in relation to the company, and
(b) the general knowledge, skill and experience that that director has.”

Both on the objective test and, having seen Mr D'Jan, on the subjective test, I think that he did not show reasonable diligence when he signed the form. He was therefore in breach of his duty to the company.

Mr Russen said that nevertheless the company could not complain of the breach of duty because it is a principle of company law that an act authorised by all the shareholders is in law the act of the company: see Multinational Gas and Petrochemical Co v Multinational Gas and Petrochemical Services Ltd [1983] Ch 258. Mr D'Jan held 99 of the 100 issued ordinary shares and Mrs D'Jan held the other. Mr D'Jan must be taken to have authorised the wrong answer in the proposal because he signed it himself. As for Mrs D'Jan, she had never been known to object to anything which her husband did in the management of the company. If she had known about the way he signed the form and it was too late to put the matter right, the chances are that she would also have approved. She could hardly have brought a derivative action to sue her husband for negligence because he could have procured the passing of a resolution absolving himself from liability.

The difficulty is that unlike the Multinational case, in which the action alleged to be negligent was specifically mandated by the shareholders, neither Mr nor Mrs D'Jan gave any thought to the way in which the proposal had been filled in. Mr D'Jan did not realise that he had given a wrong answer until the insurance company repudiated. By that time the company was in liquidation. In my judgment the Multinational principle requires that the shareholders should have, whether formally or informally, mandated or ratified the act in question. It is not enough that they probably would have ratified if they had known or thought about it before the liquidation removed their power to do so.

It follows that Mr D'Jan is in principle liable to compensate the company for his breach of duty. But sec. 727 of the Companies Act 1985 gives the court a discretionary power to relieve a director wholly or in part from liability for breaches of duty, including negligence, if the court considers that he acted honestly and reasonably and ought fairly to be excused. It may seem odd that a person found to have been guilty of negligence, which involves failing to take reasonable care, can ever satisfy a court that he acted reasonably. Nevertheless, the section clearly contemplates that he may do so and it follows that conduct may be reasonable for the purposes of sec. 727 despite amounting to lack of reasonable care at common law.

In my judgment, although Mr D'Jan's 99 per cent holding of shares is not sufficient to sustain a Multinational defence, it is relevant to the exercise of the discretion under sec. 727 . It may be reasonable to take a risk in relation to your own money which would be unreasonable in relation to someone else's. And although for the purposes of the law of negligence the company is a separate entity to which Mr D'Jan owes a duty of care which cannot vary according to the number of shares he owns, I think that the economic realities of the case can be taken into account in exercising the discretion under sec. 727. His breach of duty in failing to read the form before signing was not gross. It was the kind of thing which could happen to any busy man, although, as I have said, this is not enough to excuse it. But I think it is also relevant that in 1986, with the company solvent and indeed prosperous, the only persons whose interests he was foreseeably putting at risk by not reading the form were himself and his wife. Mr D'Jan certainly acted honestly. For the purposes of sec. 727 I think he acted reasonably and I think he ought fairly to be excused for some, though not all, of the liability which he would otherwise have incurred. Mr D'Jan has proved as an unsecured creditor in the sum of £102,913. He has been paid an interim dividend of 40p in the pound and the liquidator has paid a further dividend of 20p but withheld payment to Mr D'Jan pending the resolution of these proceedings. In my view, having been responsible for the additional shortfall in respect of unsecured creditors, I do not think that he should be allowed any further participation in competition with ordinary trade creditors. On the other hand, I do not think it would be fair to ask him to return what he has received or make a further contribution out of his own pocket to the company's assets. I therefore declare that Mr D'Jan is liable to compensate the company for the loss caused by his breach of duty in an amount not exceeding any unpaid dividends to which he would otherwise be entitled as an unsecured creditor.

== See also ==
- Re Cardiff Savings Bank [1892] 2 Ch 100 (The "Marquess of Bute's Case") an older case on the subject
- Re City Equitable Fire Insurance Co [1925] Ch 407
- Bishopsgate Investment Management Ltd v Maxwell (No 2) [1993] BCLC 814
- English tort law
- Companies law
