= Sophia Crichton-Stuart, Marchioness of Bute =

Scottish noblewoman (1809–1859)

The Most Honourable The Marchioness of Bute
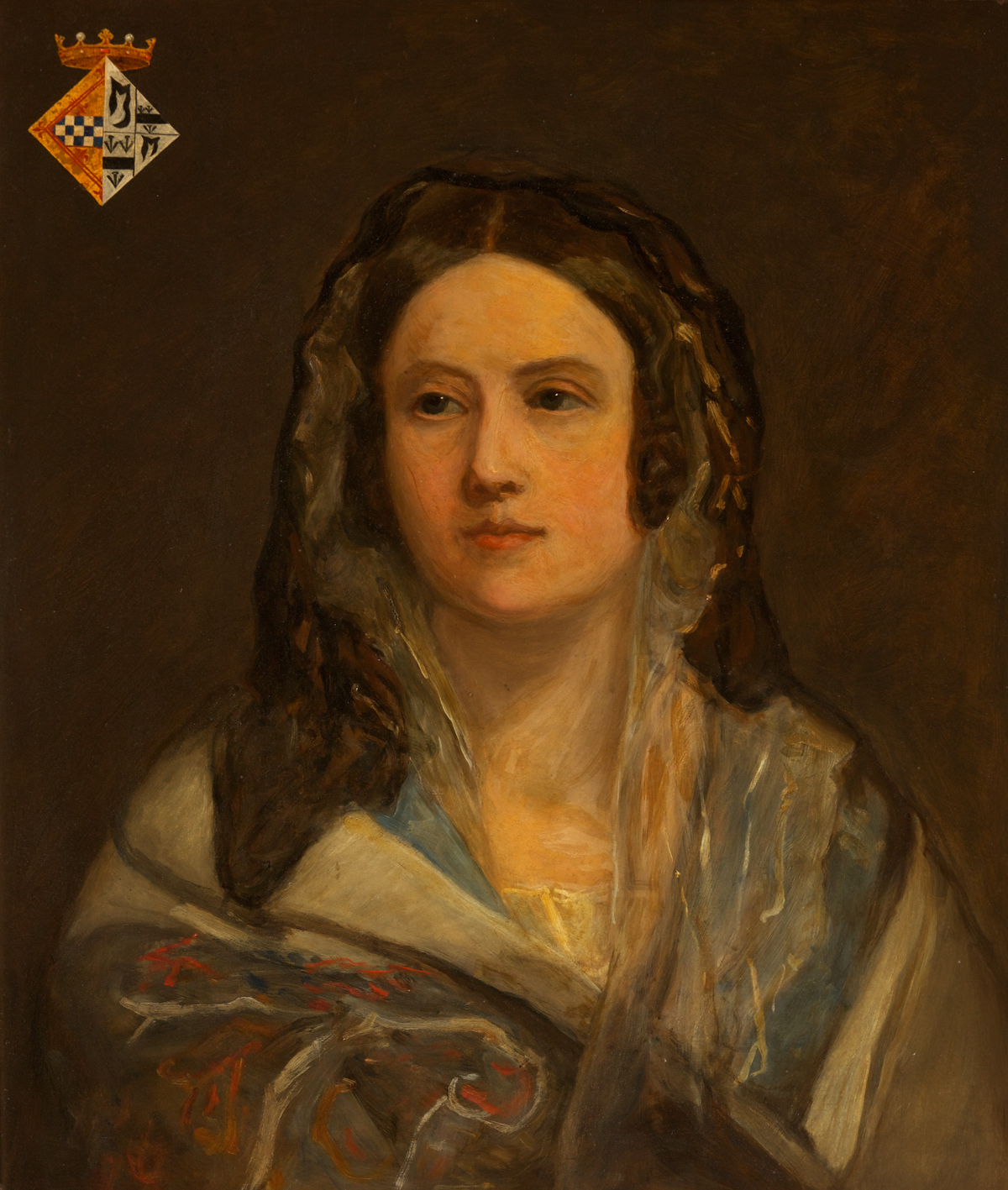
- Born: Lady Sophia Frederica Christina Rawdon-Hastings; 1 February 1809; St James's Place, London, England
- Died: 28 December 1859 (aged 50); Edinburgh, Scotland
- Burial place: Rothesay, Isle of Bute
- Spouse: John Crichton-Stuart, 2nd Marquess of Bute (m. 1845; died 1848)
- Children: John Crichton-Stuart, 3rd Marquess of Bute
- Parent(s): Francis Rawdon-Hastings, Earl of Moira; Flora Campbell, 6th Countess of Loudoun

Sophia Frederica Christina Crichton-Stuart, Marchioness of Bute (née Lady Sophia Rawdon-Hastings; 1 February 1809 – 28 December 1859) was a Scottish noblewoman. She was the second wife of John Crichton-Stuart, 2nd Marquess of Bute, and the mother of the 3rd Marquess. Cardiff's Sophia Gardens are named after her.

== Family background ==
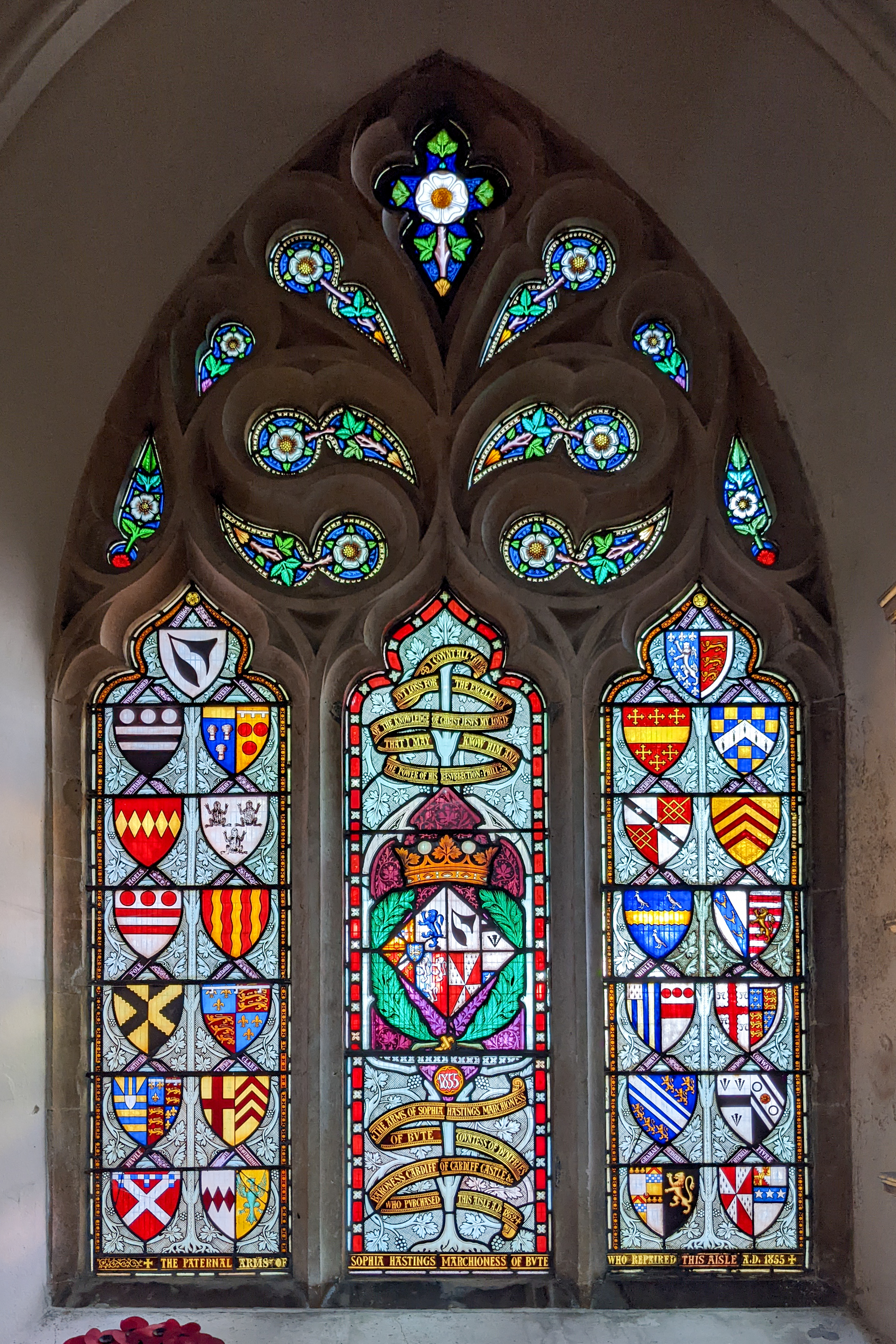
Arms of Sophia, Marchioness of Bute (centre pane), surrounded by her paternal arms, on a window at St John the Baptist Church, Cardiff

Sophia was the daughter of Flora Campbell, 6th Countess of Loudoun, and her husband Francis Rawdon-Hastings, Earl of Moira. Her father became Governor-General of India and Governor of Malta and was raised to the rank of Marquess of Hastings in 1816. He died in 1826. Sophia's elder sister was Lady Flora Hastings, a lady-in-waiting at the court of Queen Victoria of the United Kingdom. Lady Flora died in 1839 of a tumour, in circumstances that gave rise to a scandal in the court, and was nursed by Sophia. Their mother died in the following year. Lady Flora wrote poetry, and after her death Sophia edited an edition of her poems.

Sophia married the Marquess of Bute, who was fifteen years older than she, on 10 April 1845 at Loudoun Castle, Ayrshire, his first wife, Lady Maria North, having died in 1841. He had no children from his first marriage, and died aged 54 in Cardiff, only three years after his second marriage, leaving a six-month-old son who succeeded to the marquessate.

Sophia's first pregnancy had ended in a stillbirth. Her son John, the 3rd Marquess, was born on 12 September 1847 at Mount Stuart House on the Isle of Bute, Scotland.

== Philanthropy ==
The marchioness's Scottish roots did not prevent her taking an interest in the city of Cardiff, where her husband had had vast commercial and industrial interests. Sophia was an early supporter of the Welsh language; seeking to learn it herself, giving money for the establishment of the Welsh college at Llandovery, and providing financial assistance for the Eisteddfod. She was also responsible for donating the land and financing the construction of All Saints Church for Welsh-speaking Anglicans, in Tyndall Street, Cardiff. She took a particular interest in the appointment of clergy to livings in South Wales. In 1848 she wrote to her husband's agent, expressing her dismay at the action of the then Lord Chancellor, the Earl of Cottenham, who had the patronage of the parish of Llanilid and had presented the parish, "where hardly anyone speaks English, (to) a man without Welsh".

In 1858, it was Sophia who granted the people of Cardiff the use of the Bute estates between Cathedral Road and the River Taff for use as the town's first public park. The 18-acre park, named Sophia Gardens, was financed by the Marchioness and included a lodge, flower beds, landscaping and an ornamental pond, supervised by her head gardener and ready to be opened by the summer.

== Death ==
The marchioness died, aged fifty, in Edinburgh, with her twelve-year-old son at her bedside. In her will, she left provision for almshouses to be built near Edinburgh, which she specified were to be named the "Flora Almshouses" after her mother and sister. The young marquess arranged for a cast to be taken of his mother's face. A post-mortem confirmed the cause of death as Bright's disease.

The marchioness was buried in the family vault at Rothesay on the Isle of Bute. In his eulogy, the officiating minister described her as "one firm, yet gentle, loving and wise".
