= Dragon International Film Studios =

Studios in Cardiff

Dragon Studios Wales
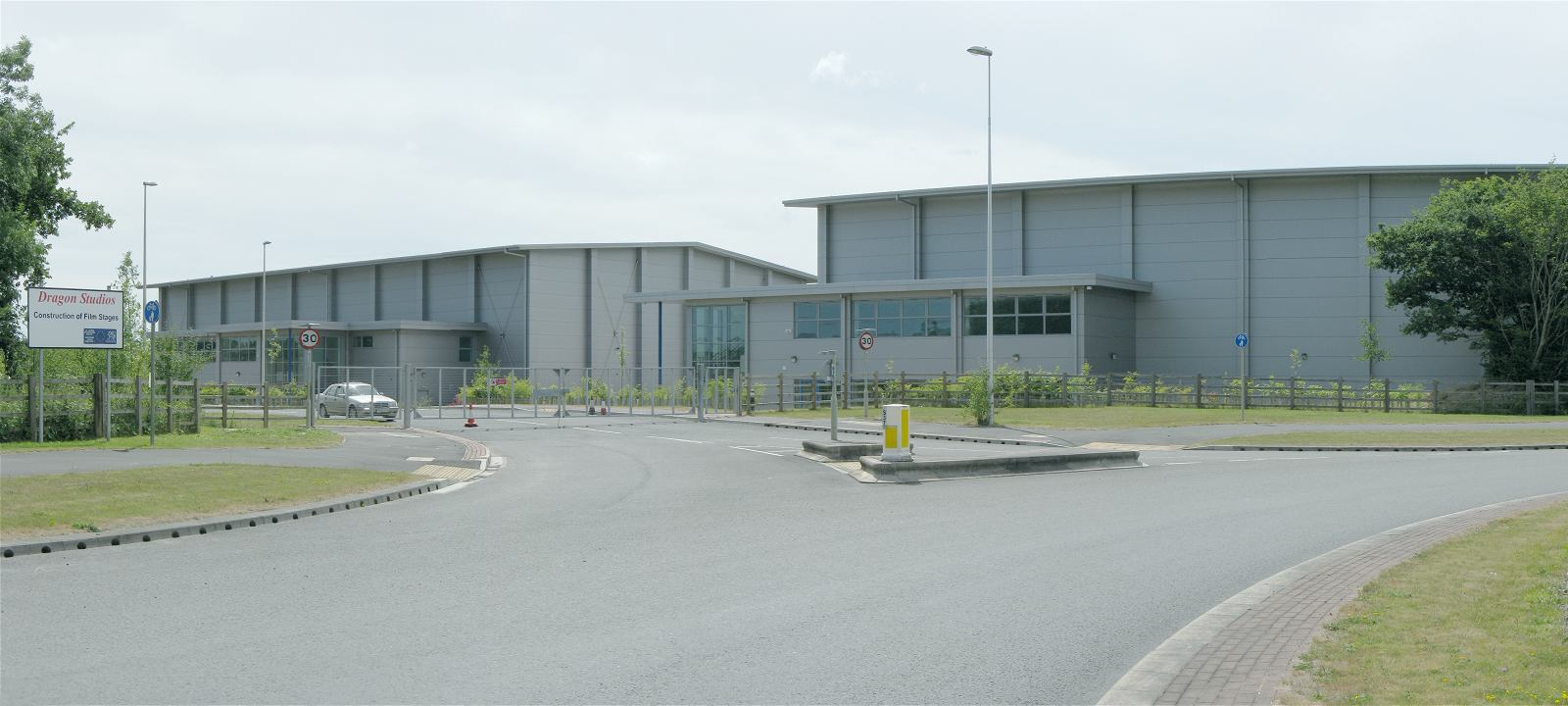
- The main gates of the studios
- Industry: Film and television production
- Founded: 2006
- Headquarters: Llanharan, Wales

Dragon Studio Wales is a complex of film and television studios in Llanharan in Wales, United Kingdom about 5 miles from Bridgend, 14 miles (23 kilometres) from the Welsh capital, Cardiff.

== Construction ==
The construction of a film studio in South Wales was first proposed in 2001, with two developers - Fairfield Properties and Westair Properties - backing the production of a 350-acre site in Llanilid near Bridgend. The Welsh Assembly government at first objected the plans, unhappy with proposals to link the studios to the M4 motorway by building a new junction to connect the site. Discussions in October 2002 between the Assembly and Rhondda Cynon Taf local council, Assembly member Pauline Jarman, and the consortium behind the bid, resolved the issues. Agreements were reached that any new access links to the M4 would only occur if a percentage of the development was completed and the construction of a theme park, which was part of a "Phase 2" of the plans. The initial proposals had an estimated budget of £350m, rising to a cost of £1bn after the completion of a screen academy and the theme park. Lord Attenborough, who was the chair of Dragon International Studios Limited, promised the studio would create 1,700 local jobs, with the local council believing a further 6,000 jobs would be created from a proposed adjacent development by the Villard Partnership, which planned to build hotels, a conference centre, health spa and a new hospital. Due to the collapse of heavy industry in South Wales over the previous decades, the development, itself built on the site of a former open-cast coal mine, was seen by those involved as a major economic boost to an area with high unemployment.

The following year, despite approved planning and a proposed completion date of 2004, no work had commenced at the site. The then chief executive of Dragon International Studios, Steve Villard, accused the Welsh Assembly of holding up the project through failing to approve grants needed to begin construction and threatened to move the whole project to a rival site in Newport. The government's response was to state that they gave assistance to cases that provided "truly viable business case". In August 2004, commencement of work was finally declared.

In early 2005, with no buildings complete, work was delayed again after dormice, a protected species in Britain, were found on the site. Despite Lord Attenborough's belief that the studio would be completed by 2004, a hold up in a grant meant that by May 2005 work at Llanilid had not commenced. In July 2005, work again halted when the firm was found not to have the necessary permits to carry out sewage works. This was followed by further delays when bad weather hampered progress until March 2006. Six years after the project was first proposed and nearly four years after planning permission was granted, construction work started on the first phase of the scheme in August 2007.

Since 2018, the site has undertaken significant development, with the new owner building a fifth 28,000 sq ft sound stage, along with offices, dressing rooms and workshop space.

== Acquisition by Shadow Holdings in 2019 ==
The business was acquired by Shadow Holdings in 2019; since then, a fifth 28,000 sq ft stage has been constructed. A post-production building was under construction as of 2022.

== Studio facilities ==
The complex has five sound stages, ranging between 10,000 and 28,000 square feet (930 and 2,600 m^{2}) in size. Dragon Studios has dedicated support space of around 75,000 sqft. Stages 1 – 4 all have a two-story office block all fitted with a toilet block, a boiler room, and a kitchen. All floors are fitted with disabled access. Across the site, there are various buildings built for executive offices, post-production, editing, art department, costume and makeup. Additional production workshops have been built for construction, prop, electrical department and storage space. The Backlot is situated central to the site, and is a large 6-acre gravel area.

== Productions ==
In 2021, Dragon Studios was the production base for the Disney+ series Willow, starring Warwick Davis.

Productions previously filmed at the studios;

- Universal's Brave New World
- FX Network's The Bastard Executioner
- TNT Network's Will
- BBC's Doctor Who, Upstairs Downstairs and Merlin.
- S4C filmed a live audience show there with X Factor's Rhydian.
- The first production to use the site was Mythic International Entertainment's Ironclad in 2009.
