= Mount Stuart House =

Category A listed building on the Isle of Bute, Scotland

- East front of Mount Stuart House
- Interactive map of Mount Stuart House
- 55.79167°N 5.01871°W
- Location: Isle of Bute, Scotland

History
- Built: 1879–1900

Site notes
- Architect: Sir Robert Rowand Anderson
- Architectural style: Gothic Revival
- Governing body: Privately owned

Listed Building – Category A
- Official name: Mount Stuart House
- Designated: 20 July 1971
- Reference no.: LB12052

Inventory of Gardens and Designed Landscapes in Scotland
- Official name: Mount Stuart (Kirrieniven)
- Designated: 30 June 1987
- Reference no.: GDL00291

Mount Stuart House, on the east coast of the Isle of Bute, Scotland, is a country house built in the Gothic Revival style and the ancestral home of the Marquesses of Bute. It was designed by Sir Robert Rowand Anderson for John Crichton-Stuart, 3rd Marquess of Bute in the late 1870s, replacing an earlier house by Alexander McGill, which burnt down in 1877. The house is a Category A listed building.

== Background ==
The house is the seat of the Stuarts of Bute, derived from the hereditary office "Steward of Bute" held since 1157. The family are male-line descendants of John Stewart, the illegitimate son of King Robert II of Scotland, the first Stuart King, by his mistress, Moira Leitch. By virtue of this descent, they are also descendants of Robert the Bruce, whose daughter Marjorie was mother of Robert II by her marriage to Walter Stewart, 6th High Steward of Scotland.

== History ==
The original house was built in 1719 for James Stuart, 2nd Earl of Bute, but was rebuilt for John Crichton-Stuart, 3rd Marquess of Bute following a fire on 3 December 1877. After his earlier creations of Cardiff Castle and Castell Coch in Cardiff, the Marquess used many of the builders and workman he had employed in South Wales, including William Burges and much of that architect's team. Burges built an oratory at the house. The main part of the present house is a flamboyant example of 19th-century Gothic Revival architecture, built in a reddish-brown stone. Mount Stuart's major features include the colonnaded Marble Hall at the centre of the main block and the Marble Chapel, which has an elaborate spired tower which is the tallest part of the building. Two earlier wings in a strikingly different style survive. They are much smaller in scale, have Georgian-style sash windows and are painted white.

Much of the furniture was custom-designed for the house by Robert Weir Schultz in the early years of the 20th century. He also laid out many sections of the gardens.

Mount Stuart House claims to have the first ever heated swimming pool to be contained within a house; it was also the first home in Scotland to be lit by electricity.

Mount Stuart was used as a Royal Naval Hospital during World War I. It was complete with an X-ray room and an operating theatre. A total of 2120 patients were admitted.

The house holds the Bute Collection, a private collection of artwork and artefacts. The Collection also houses archives, books, furniture, and silverwork reflecting the interests of the Bute family's various generations, including 25,000 books on topics including theology, botany, agriculture and Scottish history and literature. In April 2016 it was announced that a Shakespeare First Folio had been discovered in the House's Library. The folio had belonged to Isaac Reed.

The house is open to the public.

== Gallery ==
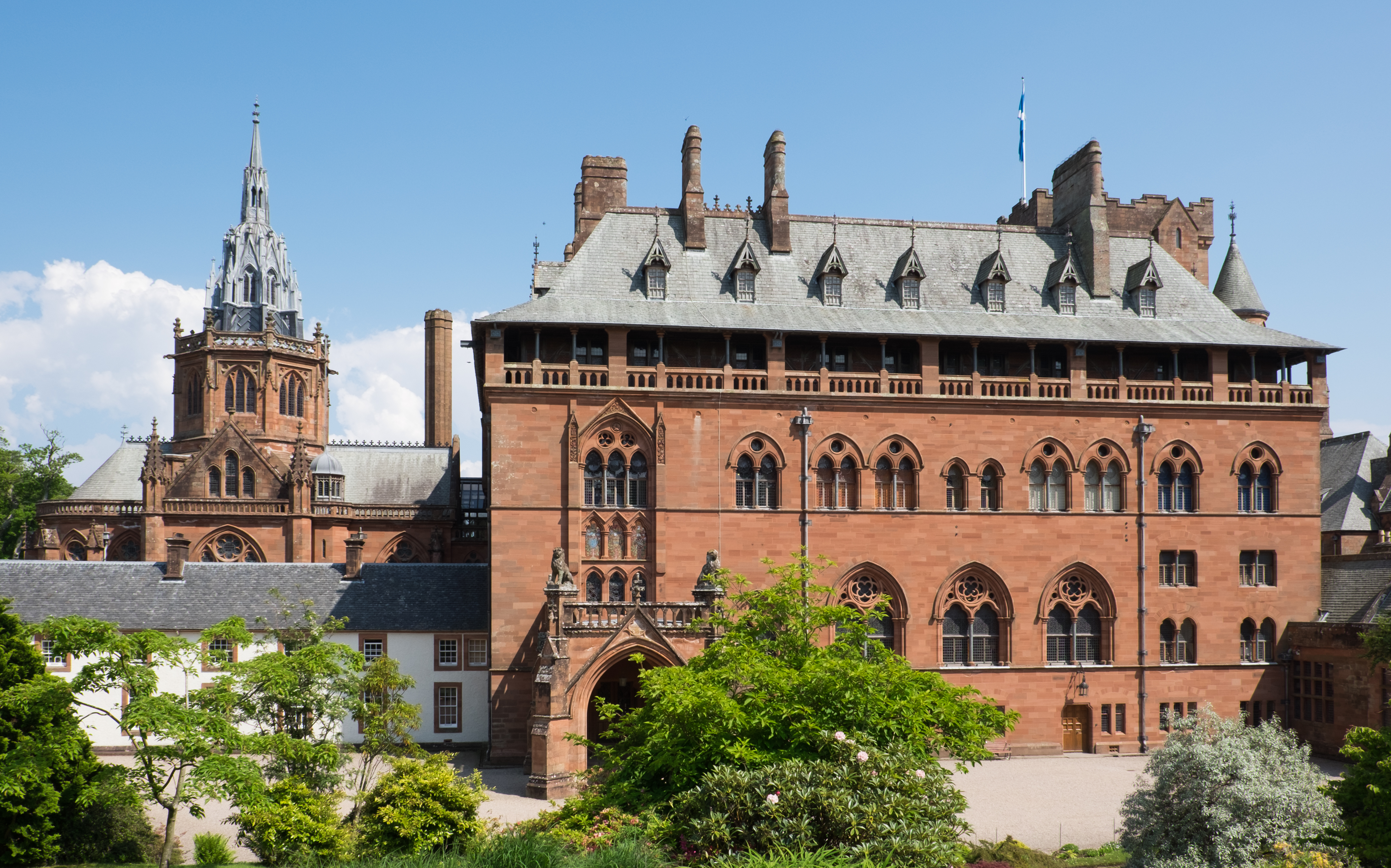
West front, showing one of the wings surviving from the previous house

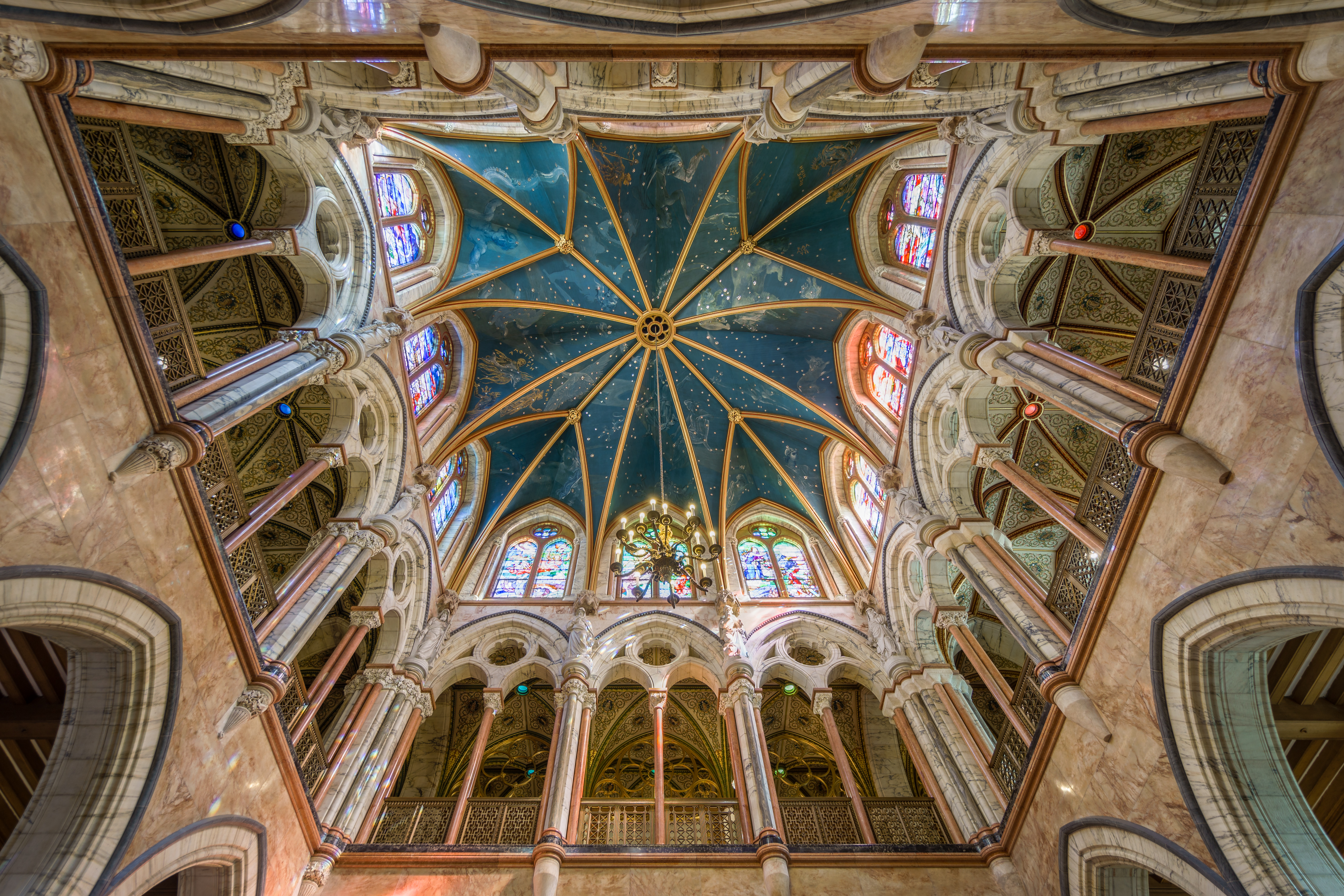
Marble Hall

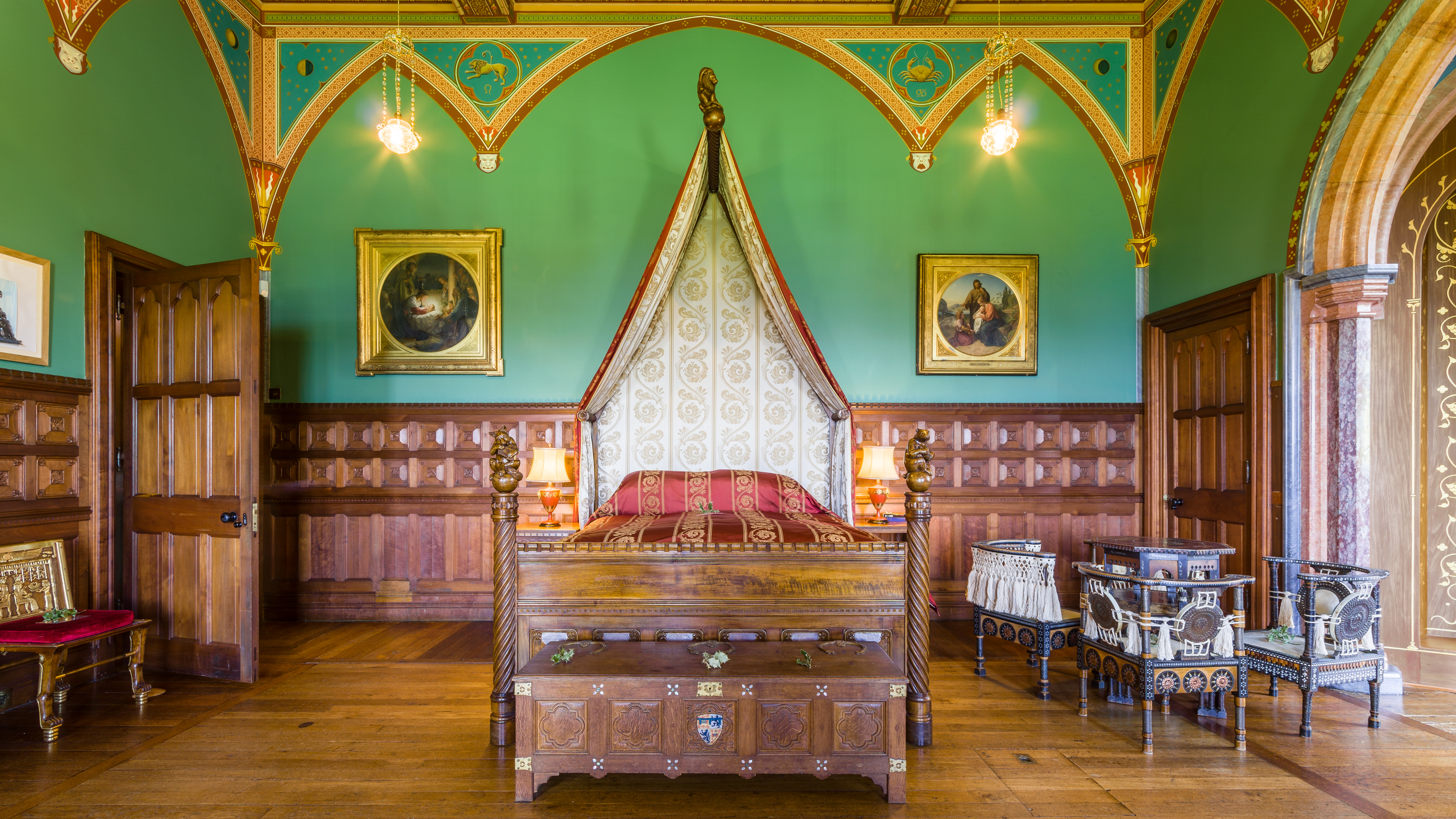
Horoscope Room

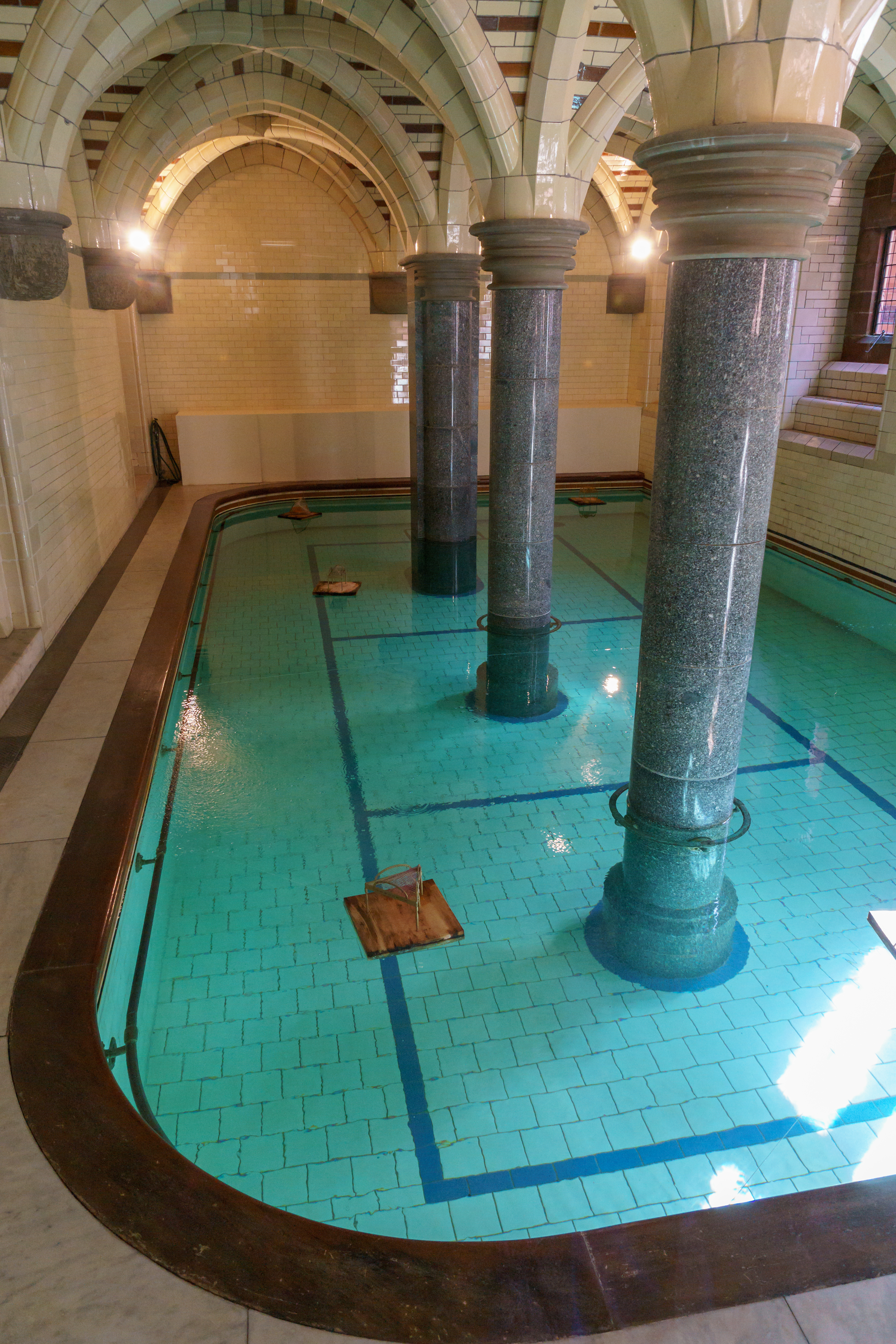
Swimming pool

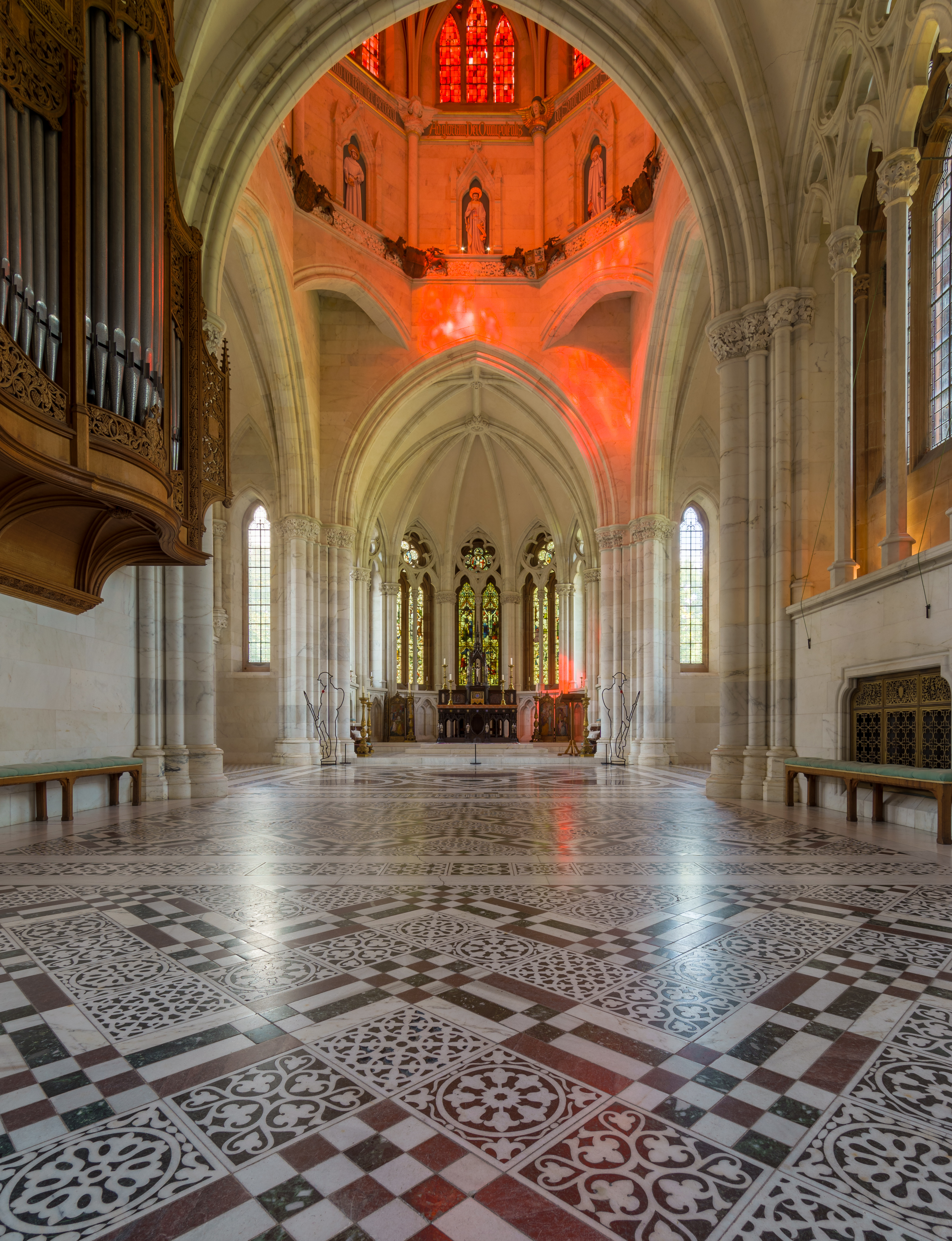
Chapel interior
