= Castell Coch Woodlands and Road Section =

Protected area in Glamorgan, Wales

Coordinates: 51.536°N 3.2543°W

Castell Coch Woodlands and Road Section is a Site of Special Scientific Interest to the north of Cardiff, Wales, significant for both its biological and geological interest.

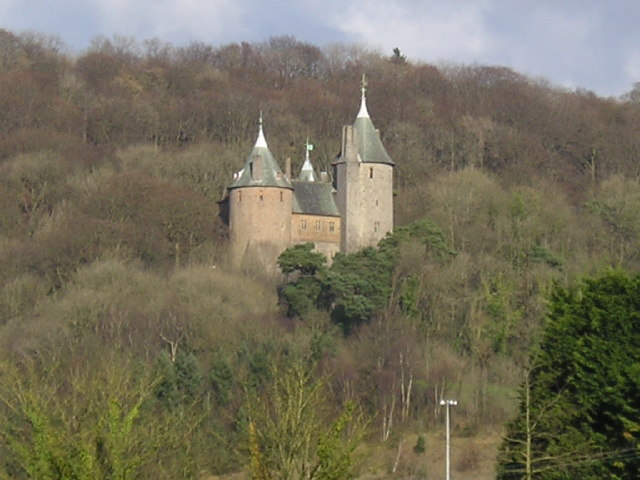
The woodland surrounding Castell Coch

Map showing the boundaries of Castell Coch woodlands SSSI

The SSSI (located at grid reference ST131827) covers an area of 17 hectares (42 acres) around the Victorian gothic castle of Castell Coch, 5 miles, 8 km north-west of Cardiff. The steep south and west facing slopes have extensive beech woodlands – thought to be the furthest west that such woods occur. The mature beech woodland supports a ground flora that reflects the ancient nature of the woodland, with bird's-nest orchid, butterfly orchid, dog's mercury, ramsons and sanicle locally abundant.

Geologically, the steep slopes reveal a sequence of rock bedding from the Devonian Old Red Sandstone into the Carboniferous Limestone. Unlike other exposures in South Wales, the lowest Carboniferous Limestone beds here represent the start of the period. Much of the SSSI is open for public access, and adjoins the large area of Forestry Commission woodland known as Fforest Fawr.
