= John Starling Chapple =

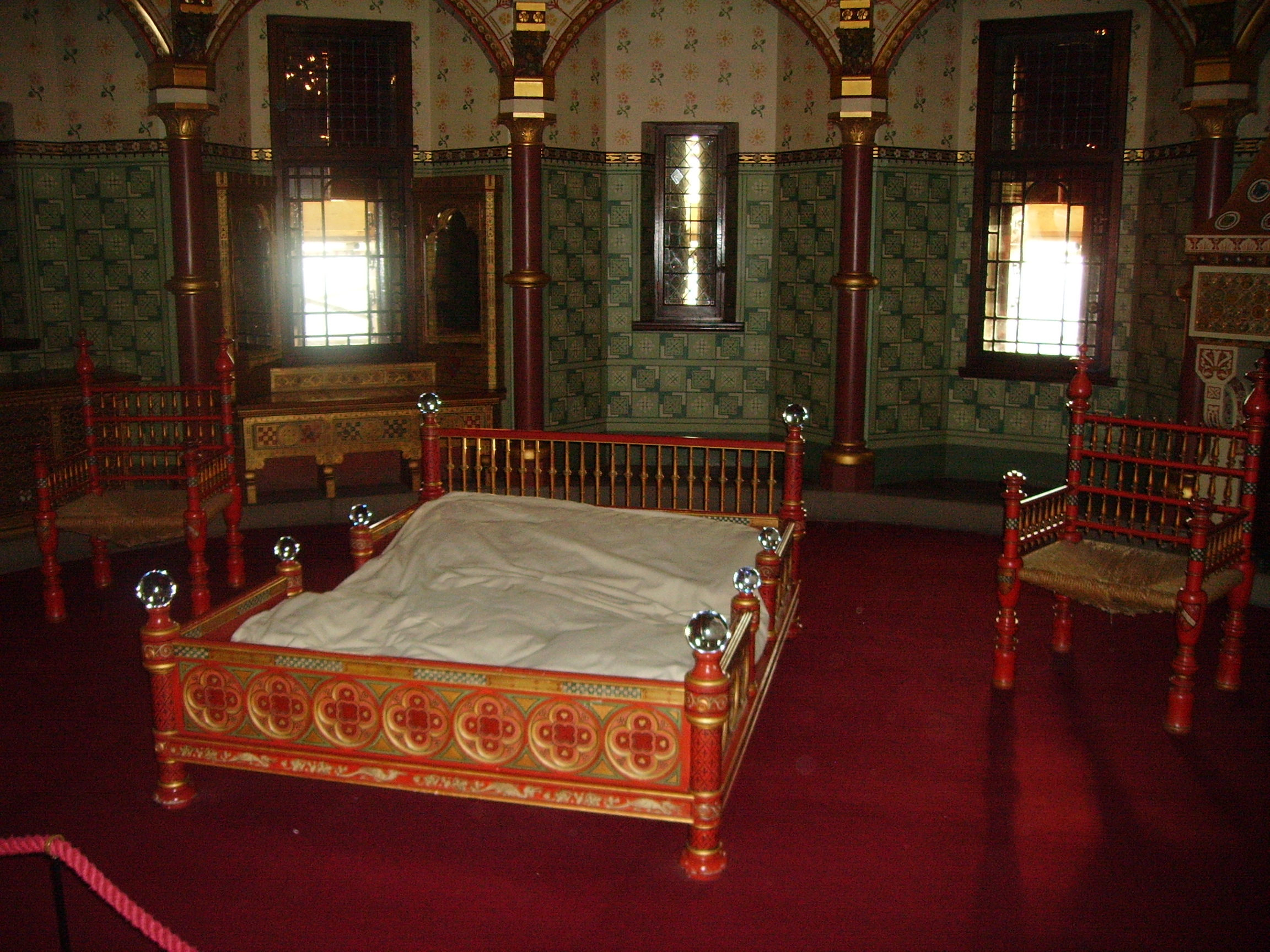
- Furniture by Chapple in Lady Bute's Bedroom, Castell Coch
- Born: 1840; Exeter, England
- Died: 1922 (aged 81–82); Barnet, London, England

John Starling Chapple (1840–1922) was a stonemason and architect who worked as office manager for William Burges.

Born in Exeter, the son of a carpenter, he moved to London and worked with Burges from the 1850s until the latter's death in 1881. Chapple was close to Burges and was one of the executors of his will. On Burges's death, Chapple wrote "a constant relationship...with one of the brightest ornaments of the profession has rendered the parting most severe. Thank God his work will live and ... be the admiration of future students. I have hardly got to realize my lonely position yet. He was almost all the world to me." Burges's practice was inherited by his brother-in-law, Richard Popplewell Pullan and Chapple worked with him on the two volumes of drawings of Burges's work which Pullan published in the mid -1880s. Chapple also worked with Pullan and William Frame in completing a number of Burges's unfinished works, including Cardiff Castle, and Castell Coch, the fantasy palaces Burges designed for John Crichton-Stuart, 3rd Marquess of Bute in South Wales. At Castell Coch, Chapple was responsible for much of the furniture, including the elaborate suite in Lady Bute's bedroom. He also completed St Michael's Church, Brighton.

Chapple retired in 1911 and died at Barnet in 1922.
