= Royal Navy =

Naval warfare force of the United Kingdom

- Logo of the Royal Navy
- Founded: 1546; 480 years ago
- Country: United Kingdom
- Type: Navy
- Role: Naval warfare
- Size: 32,520 active personnel; 3,230 maritime reserve (Note: Since April 2013, Ministry of Defence publications no longer report the entire strength of the Regular Reserve; instead, only Regular Reserves serving under a fixed-term reserve contract are counted. These contracts are similar in nature to the Maritime Reserve.); 2,550 other personnel; 60 commissioned and active ships; 69 including RFA (Note: In Royal Navy parlance, "commissioned ships" invariably refers to both submarines and surface ships. Non-commissioned ships operated by or in support of His Majesty's Naval Service are not included.); 160 aircraft
- Part of: His Majesty's Naval Service
- Naval Staff Offices: Whitehall, London
- Nickname: Senior Service
- Mottos: "Si vis pacem, para bellum" (Latin) (If you wish for peace, prepare for war)
- Colours: Navy blue White; Gold
- March: Quick – "Heart of Oak"; Slow – Westering Home (de facto)
- Fleet: 1 ship of the line; 2 aircraft carriers; 10 submarines; 6 destroyers; 5 frigates; 8 offshore patrol vessels; 7 mine countermeasures vessels; 18 fast patrol boats; 2 survey ships; 1 ice patrol ship
- Engagements: See list: Anglo-Spanish War; Dutch–Portuguese War; Ottoman–Portuguese conflicts; Anglo-Spanish War of 1625–1630; First Anglo-Dutch War; Anglo-Spanish War (1654–1660); Second Anglo-Dutch War; Third Anglo-Dutch War; Nine Years' War; War of the Spanish Succession; War of the Quadruple Alliance; War of Jenkins' Ear; War of the Austrian Succession; Seven Years' War; American Revolutionary War; Anglo-Spanish War (1779–1783); French Revolutionary Wars; Napoleonic Wars; War of 1812; Greek War of Independence; First Opium War; Second Opium War; Crimean War; Anglo-Bruneian War; Second Schleswig War; Anglo-Persian War; Second Anglo-Chinese War; Anglo-Ashanti Wars; Anglo-Zanzibar War; Mahdist War; Boxer Rebellion; First World War; Second World War; Korean War; Suez Crisis; Indonesian Confrontation; Cod Wars; Beira Patrol; Malayan Emergency; Falklands War; Gulf War; Kosovo War; War in Afghanistan (2001–2021); Iraq War; 2011 military intervention in Libya (Operation Ellamy); War against the Islamic State (Operation Shader); Operation Atalanta; Operation Prosperity Guardian
- Website: www.royalnavy.mod.uk

Commanders
- Head of the Armed Forces and Lord High Admiral: King Charles III
- First Sea Lord and Chief of the Naval Staff: General Sir Gwyn Jenkins
- Second Sea Lord and Deputy Chief of the Naval Staff: Vice Admiral Paul Beattie
- Fleet Commander: Vice Admiral Stephen Moorhouse

Insignia
- White Ensign (Note: 1630–1707 Middle Ages – 1707 1707–1800)

- Naval jack (Note: 1545–1606 Middle Ages – 1606 1606–1800)

- Pennant

- King's Colour

Aircraft flown
- Attack: Wildcat HMA2; F-35 Lightning II
- Fighter: F-35 Lightning II
- Patrol: Merlin HM2; Wildcat HMA2
- Reconnaissance: Commando Wildcat AH1; RQ-12A Wasp UAV; RQ-20 Puma UAV; Peregrine rotary-wing UAV
- Trainer: Avenger T1; Juno HT1; Prefect T1; Tutor T1
- Transport: Merlin HC4/4A

The Royal Navy (RN) is the naval warfare force of the United Kingdom, responsible for defending the country, the Crown Dependencies, and the Overseas Territories from naval attack or invasion. It is a component of His Majesty's Naval Service, and its officers hold their commissions from the King. Although warships were used by English and Scottish kings from the early medieval period, the first major maritime engagements were fought in the Hundred Years' War against France. The modern Royal Navy traces its origins to the English Navy of the early 16th century, making it the oldest of the United Kingdom's armed services. It is consequently known as the Senior Service.

From the early 18th century until the Second World War, it was the world's most powerful navy. The Royal Navy played a key part in establishing and defending the British Empire, and four Imperial fortress colonies and a string of imperial bases and coaling stations secured the Royal Navy's ability to assert naval superiority. Following World War I, it was significantly reduced in size. During the Cold War, the Royal Navy transformed into a primarily anti-submarine force, hunting for Soviet submarines and mostly active in the GIUK gap. Following the collapse of the Soviet Union, its focus returned to expeditionary operations.

The Royal Navy maintains a fleet of technologically sophisticated ships, submarines, and aircraft, including two Queen Elizabeth-class aircraft carriers, four Vanguard-class ballistic missile submarines (which carry the Trident strategic nuclear weapons), six Astute-class nuclear-powered attack submarines, six Type 45 guided missile destroyers, five Type 23 frigates, seven mine-countermeasure vessels and twenty-six patrol vessels. As of July 2026, there are 60 active and commissioned ships (including submarines as well as one historic ship, HMS Victory) in the Royal Navy, plus 9 ships of the Royal Fleet Auxiliary (RFA). There are also four Point-class sealift ships from the Merchant Navy available to the RFA under a private finance initiative, while the civilian Marine Services operate auxiliary vessels which further support the Royal Navy in various capacities.

The Royal Navy is part of His Majesty's Naval Service, which also includes the Royal Marines and the Royal Fleet Auxiliary. The professional head of the Naval Service is the First Sea Lord who is a general and member of the Defence Council of the United Kingdom. The Defence Council delegates management of the Naval Service to the Admiralty Board, chaired by the secretary of state for defence. The Royal Navy operates from three bases in Britain where commissioned ships and submarines are based: Portsmouth, Clyde and Devonport, the last being the largest operational naval base in Western Europe, as well as two naval air stations, RNAS Yeovilton and RNAS Culdrose where maritime aircraft are based.

== Role ==
The Royal Navy stated its six major roles in umbrella terms in 2017 as:

- Preventing Conflict – On a global and regional level
- Providing Security At Sea – To ensure the stability of international trade at sea
- International Partnerships – To help cement the relationship with the United Kingdom's allies (such as NATO)
- Maintaining a Readiness To Fight – To protect the United Kingdom's interests across the globe
- Protecting the Economy – To safeguard vital trade routes to guarantee the United Kingdom's and its allies' economic prosperity at sea
- Providing Humanitarian Aid – To deliver a fast and effective response to global catastrophes

The Royal Navy protects British interests at home and abroad, executing the foreign and defence policies of His Majesty's Government through the exercise of military effect, diplomatic activities and other activities in support of these objectives. It is also a key element of the British contribution to NATO, with several ships or aircraft allocated to NATO tasks at any time. In 2007 core capabilities were described as:

- Maintenance of the UK Nuclear Deterrent through a policy of Continuous at Sea Deterrence
- Provision of two medium-scale maritime task groups with the Fleet Air Arm
- Delivery of the UK Commando force
- Contribution of assets to the Joint Aviation Command
- Maintenance of standing patrol commitments
- Provision of mine counter measures capability to United Kingdom and allied commitments
- Provision of hydrographic and meteorological services deployable worldwide
- Protection of Britain's Exclusive Economic Zone

== History ==
The English Royal Navy was formally founded in 1546 by Henry VIII, though the Kingdom of England had possessed less-organised naval forces for centuries prior to this.

The Royal Scots Navy (or Old Scots Navy) had its origins in the Middle Ages until its merger with the English Royal Navy per the Acts of Union 1707.

=== Earlier fleets ===
During much of the medieval period, fleets or "king's ships" were often established or gathered for specific campaigns or actions, and these would disperse afterwards. These were generally merchant ships enlisted into service. Unlike some European states, England did not maintain a small permanent core of warships in peacetime. England's naval organisation was haphazard and the mobilisation of fleets when war broke out was slow. Control of the sea only became critical to Anglo-Saxon kings in the 10th century. In the 11th century, Æthelred the Unready had a large fleet built by a national levy. During the period of Danish rule in the 11th century, authorities maintained a standing fleet by taxation, and this continued for a time under Edward the Confessor, who frequently commanded fleets in person. After the Norman Conquest in 1066, English naval power waned and England suffered large naval raids from the Vikings. In 1069, this allowed for the invasion and ravaging of England by Jarl Osborn, brother of King Svein Estridsson, and his sons.

The lack of an organised navy came to a head during the First Barons' War, in which Prince Louis of France invaded England in support of northern barons. With King John unable to organise a navy, this meant the French landed at Sandwich unopposed in April 1216. John's flight to Winchester and his death later that year left William Marshal, 1st Earl of Pembroke as regent, and he was able to marshal ships to fight the French in the Battle of Sandwich in 1217 – one of the first major English battles at sea. The outbreak of the Hundred Years War emphasised the need for an English fleet. French plans for an invasion of England failed when Edward III of England destroyed the French fleet in the Battle of Sluys in 1340. England's naval forces could not prevent frequent raids on the south-coast ports by the French and their allies. Such raids halted only with the occupation of northern France by Henry V.

A Scottish fleet existed by the reign of William the Lion in the late 12th century. In the early 13th century there was a resurgence of Viking naval power in the region. The Vikings clashed with Scotland over control of the isles though Alexander III was ultimately successful in asserting Scottish control. The Scottish fleet was of particular import in repulsing English forces in the early 14th century.

=== Age of Sail ===
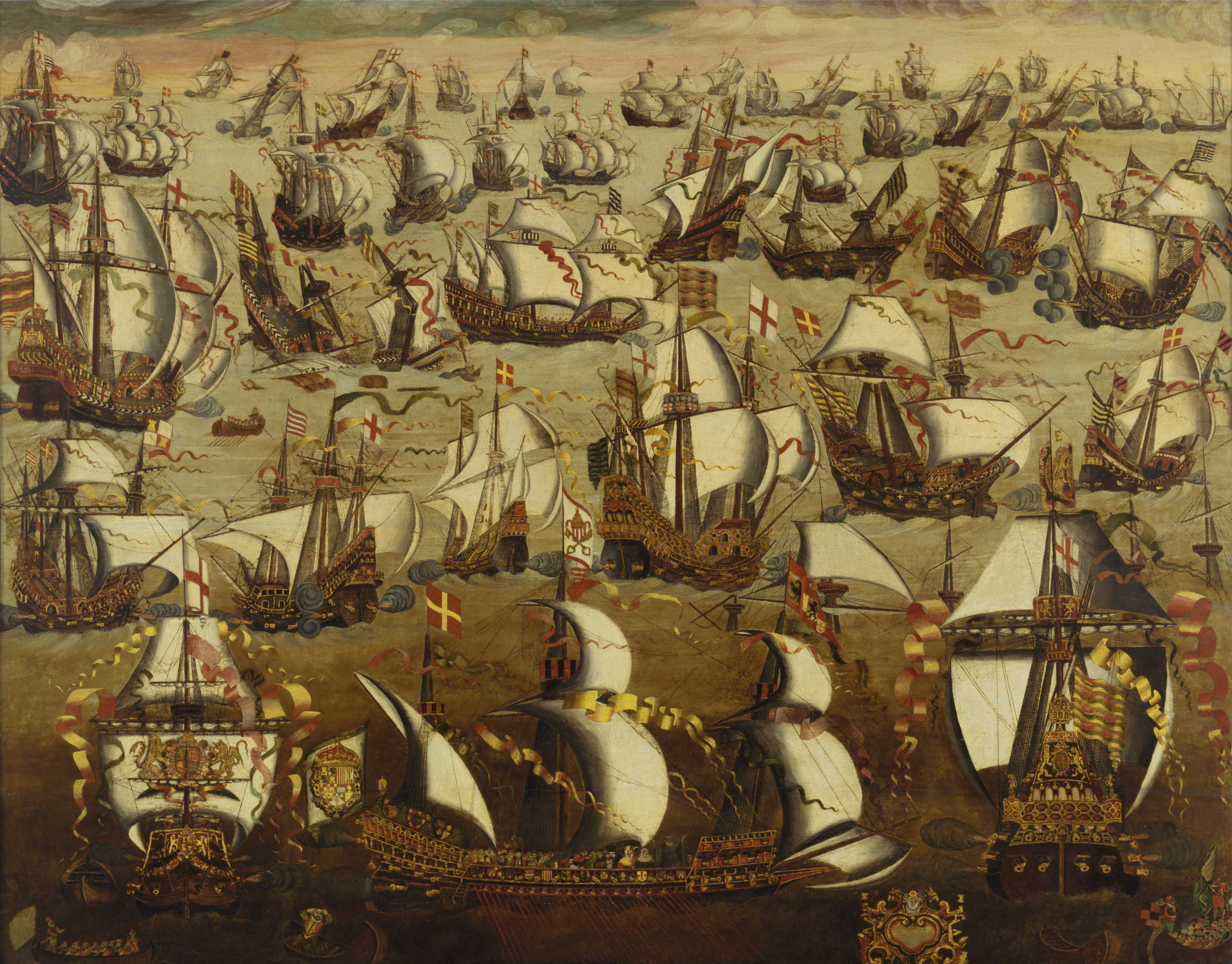
A late 16th-century portrait of the Spanish Armada battling Royal Navy warships

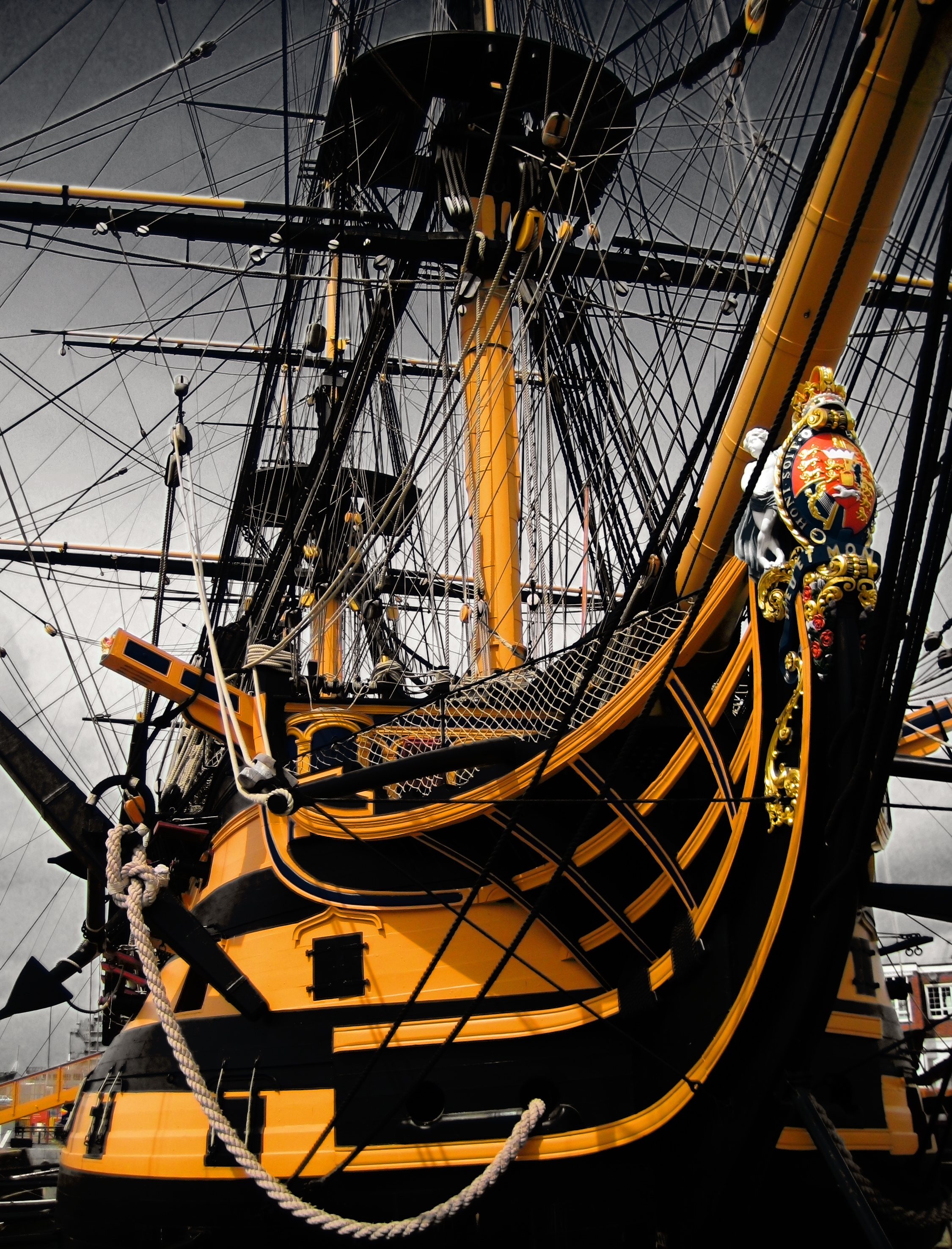
HMS Victory, Nelson's flagship at Trafalgar, is still a commissioned Royal Navy ship, although she is now permanently kept in dry-dock.

A standing "Navy Royal", with its own secretariat, dockyards and a permanent core of purpose-built warships, emerged during the reign of Henry VIII. Under Elizabeth I, England became involved in a war with Spain, which saw privately owned vessels combining with the Queen's ships in highly profitable raids against Spanish commerce and colonies. The Royal Navy was then used in 1588 to repulse the Spanish Armada, but the English Armada was lost the next year. In 1603, the Union of the Crowns created a personal union between England and Scotland. While the two remained distinct sovereign states for a further century, the two navies increasingly fought as a single force. During the early 17th century, England's relative naval power deteriorated until Charles I undertook a major programme of shipbuilding. His methods of financing the fleet contributed to the outbreak of the English Civil War, and the abolition of the monarchy.

The Commonwealth of England replaced many names and symbols in the new Commonwealth Navy, associated with royalty and the high church, and expanded it to become the most powerful in the world. The fleet was quickly tested in the First Anglo-Dutch War (1652–1654) and the Anglo-Spanish War (1654–1660), which saw the British conquest of Jamaica and successful attacks on Spanish treasure fleets. The 1660 Restoration saw Charles II rename the Royal Navy again, and started use of the prefix HMS. The Navy remained a national institution and not a possession of the Crown as it had been before. Following the Glorious Revolution of 1688, England joined the War of the Grand Alliance which marked the end of France's brief pre-eminence at sea and the beginning of an enduring British supremacy which would help with the creation of the British Empire.

In 1707, the Scottish navy was united with the English Royal Navy. On Scottish men-of-war, the cross of St Andrew was replaced with the Union Jack. On English ships, the red, white, or blue ensigns had the St George's Cross of England removed from the canton, and the combined crosses of the Union flag put in its place. Throughout the 18th and 19th centuries, the Royal Navy was the largest maritime force in the world, maintaining superiority in financing, tactics, training, organisation, social cohesion, hygiene, logistical support and warship design. The peace settlement following the War of the Spanish Succession (1702–1714) granted Britain Gibraltar and Menorca, providing the Navy with Mediterranean bases. The expansion of the Royal Navy would encourage the British colonisation of the Americas, with British (North) America becoming a vital source of timber for the Royal Navy. There was a defeat during the frustrated siege of Cartagena de Indias in 1741. A new French attempt to invade Britain was thwarted by the defeat of their escort fleet in the extraordinary Battle of Quiberon Bay in 1759, fought in dangerous conditions. In 1762, the resumption of hostilities with Spain led to the British capture of Manila and of Havana, along with a Spanish fleet sheltering there. British naval supremacy could however be challenged still in this period by coalitions of other nations, as seen in the American War of Independence. The United States was allied to France, and the Netherlands and Spain were also at war with Britain. In the Battle of the Chesapeake in 1781, the British fleet failed to lift the French blockade, resulting in the surrender of an entire British army at Yorktown.

The French Revolutionary and Napoleonic Wars (1793–1801, 1803–1814 & 1815) saw the Royal Navy reach a peak of efficiency, dominating the navies of all Britain's adversaries, which spent most of the war blockaded in port. Although the largest and potentially most dangerous mutinies in the history of the Royal Navy took place at Spithead and the Nore in spring 1797, British domination at sea was not threatened. Under Lord Nelson, the navy defeated the combined Franco-Spanish fleet at Trafalgar (1805). Ships of the line and even frigates, as well as manpower, were prioritised for the naval war in Europe, however, leaving only smaller vessels on the North America Station and other less active stations, and a heavy reliance upon impressed labour. This would result in problems countering large, well-armed United States Navy frigates which outgunned Royal Naval vessels in single-opponent actions, as well as United States privateers, when the American War of 1812 broke out concurrent with the war against Napoleonic France and its allies. The Royal Navy still enjoyed a numerical advantage over the former colonists on the Atlantic, and from its base in Bermuda it blockaded the Atlantic seaboard of the United States throughout the war and carried out (with Royal Marines, Colonial Marines, British Army, and Board of Ordnance military corps units) various amphibious operations, most notably the Chesapeake campaign. On the Great Lakes, however, the United States Navy established an advantage.

=== Splendid isolation ===
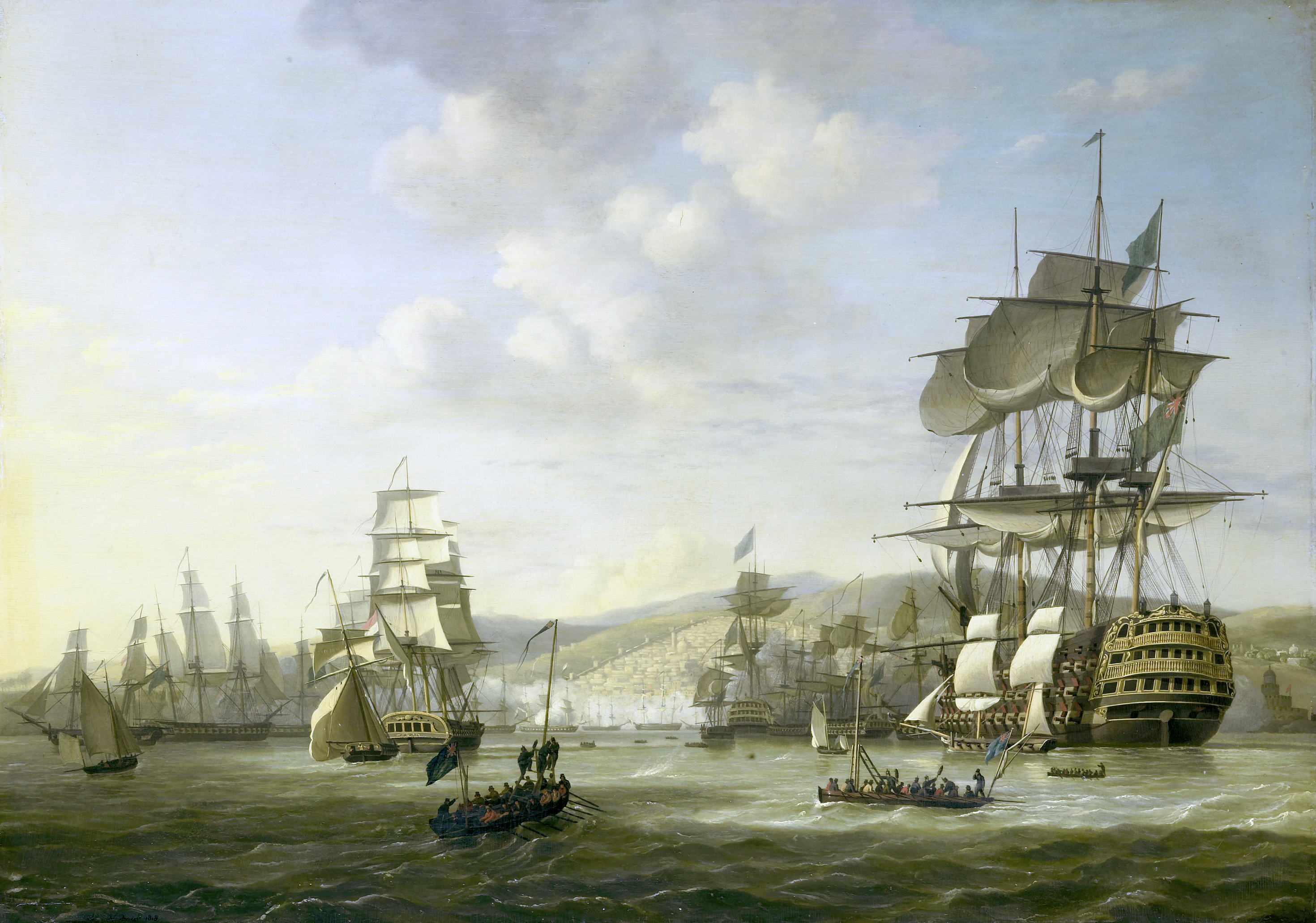
Bombardment of Algiers in north Africa by the Anglo-Dutch fleet in an attempt to stop the Barbary slave trade, 27 August 1816

In 1860, Albert, Prince Consort, wrote to the foreign secretary John Russell, 1st Earl Russell with his concern about "a perfect disgrace to our country, and particularly to the Admiralty". The stated shipbuilding policy of the British monarchy was to take advantage of technological change and so be able to deploy a new weapons system that could defend British interests before other national and imperial resources are reasonably mobilized. Nevertheless, British taxpayers scrutinized progress in modernizing the Royal Navy so as to ensure, that taxpayers' money is not wasted.

Between 1815 and 1914, the Royal Navy saw little serious action, owing to the absence of any opponent strong enough to challenge its dominance. It did not suffer the drastic cutbacks the various military forces underwent in the period of economic austerity that followed the end of the Napoleonic Wars and the American War of 1812 (when the British Army and the Board of Ordnance military corps were cut back, weakening garrisons around the Empire, the Militia became a paper tiger, and the Volunteer Force and Fencible units disbanded, though the Yeomanry was maintained as a back-up to the police). Britain relied, throughout the 19th century and the first half of the 20th century, on imperial fortress colonies (originally Bermuda, Gibraltar, Halifax (Nova Scotia), and Malta). These areas permitted Britain to control the Atlantic Ocean and Mediterranean Sea. Control of military forces in Nova Scotia passed to the new Government of Canada after the 1867 Confederation of Canada and control of the naval dockyard in Halifax, Nova Scotia was transferred to the Government of Canada in 1905, five years prior to the establishment of the Royal Canadian Navy. Prior to the 1920s, it was presumed that the only navies that could challenge the Royal Navy belonged to nations on the Atlantic Ocean or its connected seas, despite the growth of the Imperial Russian and United States Pacific fleets during the latter half of the 19th Century.

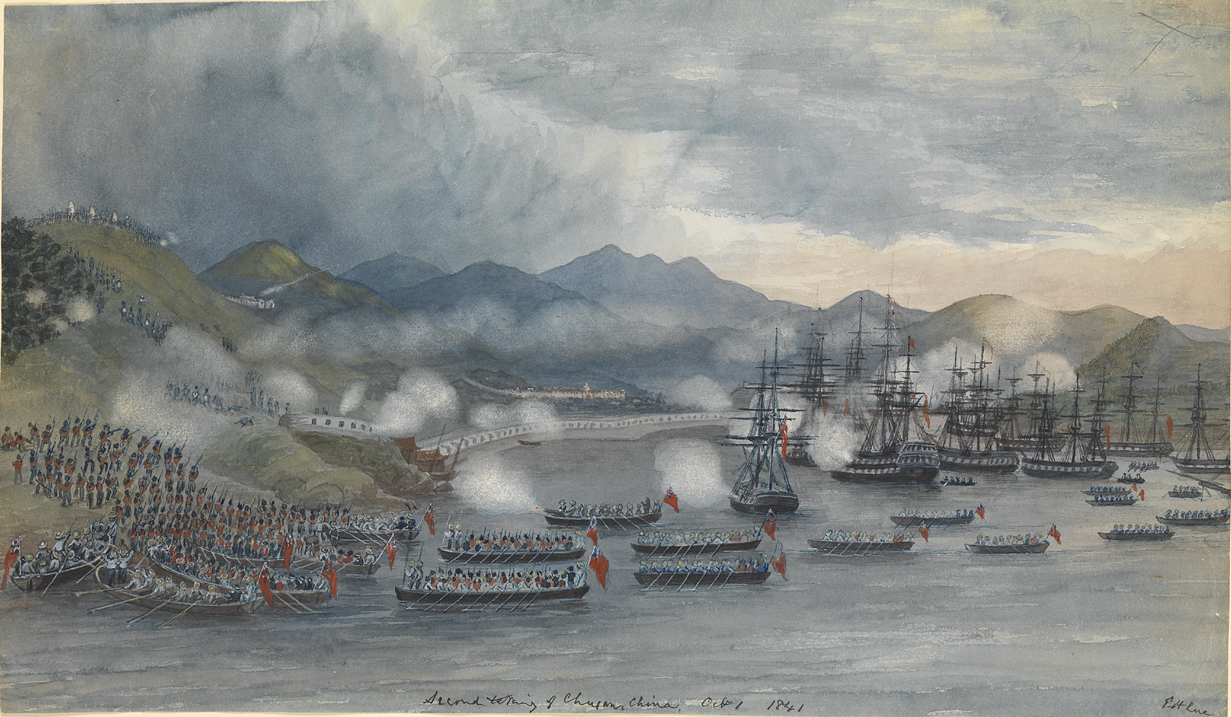
The capture of Chusan during the First Opium War on 1 October 1841

Britain relied on Malta, in the Mediterranean Sea, to project power to the Indian Ocean and western Pacific Ocean via the Suez Canal after its completion in 1869. It relied on friendship and common interests between Britain and the United States (which controlled transit through the Panama Canal, completed in 1914) during and after the First World War, and on Bermuda, to project power the length of the western Atlantic, including the Caribbean Sea and Gulf of Mexico. The area controlled from Bermuda (and Halifax until 1905) had been part of the North America Station, until the 1820s, which then absorbed the Jamaica Station to become the North America and West Indies Station. After the First World War, this formation assumed responsibility for the eastern Pacific Ocean and the western South Atlantic and was known as the America and West Indies Station until 1956. In 1921, due to the ambitions of Imperial Japan and the threat of the Imperial Japanese Navy, it was decided to construct the Singapore Naval Base.

During this period, naval warfare underwent a comprehensive transformation, brought about by steam propulsion, metal ship construction, and explosive munitions. Despite having to completely replace its war fleet, the Navy managed to maintain its overwhelming advantage over all potential rivals. Owing to British leadership in the Industrial Revolution, the country enjoyed unparalleled shipbuilding capacity and financial resources, which ensured that no rival could take advantage of these revolutionary changes to negate the British advantage in ship numbers. In 1889, Parliament passed the Naval Defence Act, which formally adopted the 'two-power standard', which stipulated that the Royal Navy should maintain a number of battleships at least equal to the combined strength of the next two largest navies. The end of the 19th century saw structural changes and older vessels were scrapped or placed into reserve, making funds and manpower available for newer ships. The launch of HMS Dreadnought in 1906 rendered all existing battleships obsolete. The transition at this time from coal to fuel-oil for boiler firing would encourage Britain to expand their foothold in former Ottoman territories in the Middle East, especially Iraq.

=== Exploration ===
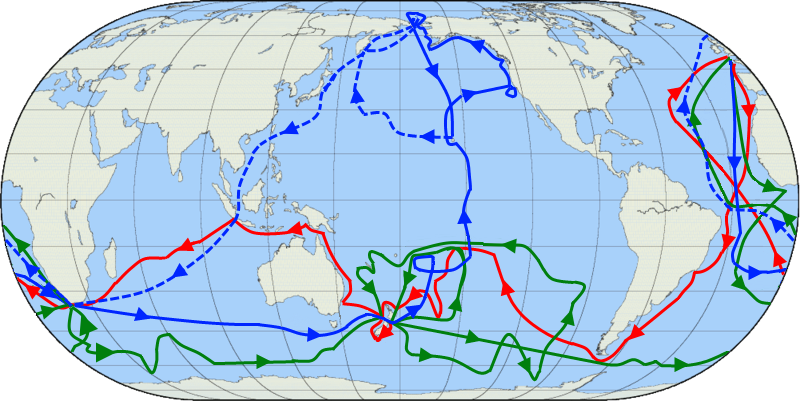
The routes of Royal Navy Captain James Cook's three voyages

The Royal Navy played an historic role in several great global explorations of science and discovery. Beginning in the 18th century many great voyages were commissioned often in co-operation with the Royal Society, such as the Northwest Passage expedition of 1741. James Cook led three great voyages, with goals such as discovering Terra Australis, observing the Transit of Venus and searching for the elusive North-West Passage, these voyages are considered to have contributed to world knowledge and science. In the late 18th century, during a four year voyage Captain George Vancouver made detailed maps of the western coastline of North America.

In the 19th century, Charles Darwin made further contributions to science during the second voyage of HMS Beagle. The Ross expedition to the Antarctic made several important discoveries in biology and zoology. Several of the Royal Navy's voyages ended in disaster such as those of Franklin and Scott. Between 1872 and 1876 HMS Challenger undertook the first global marine research expedition, the Challenger expedition.

=== World War I ===
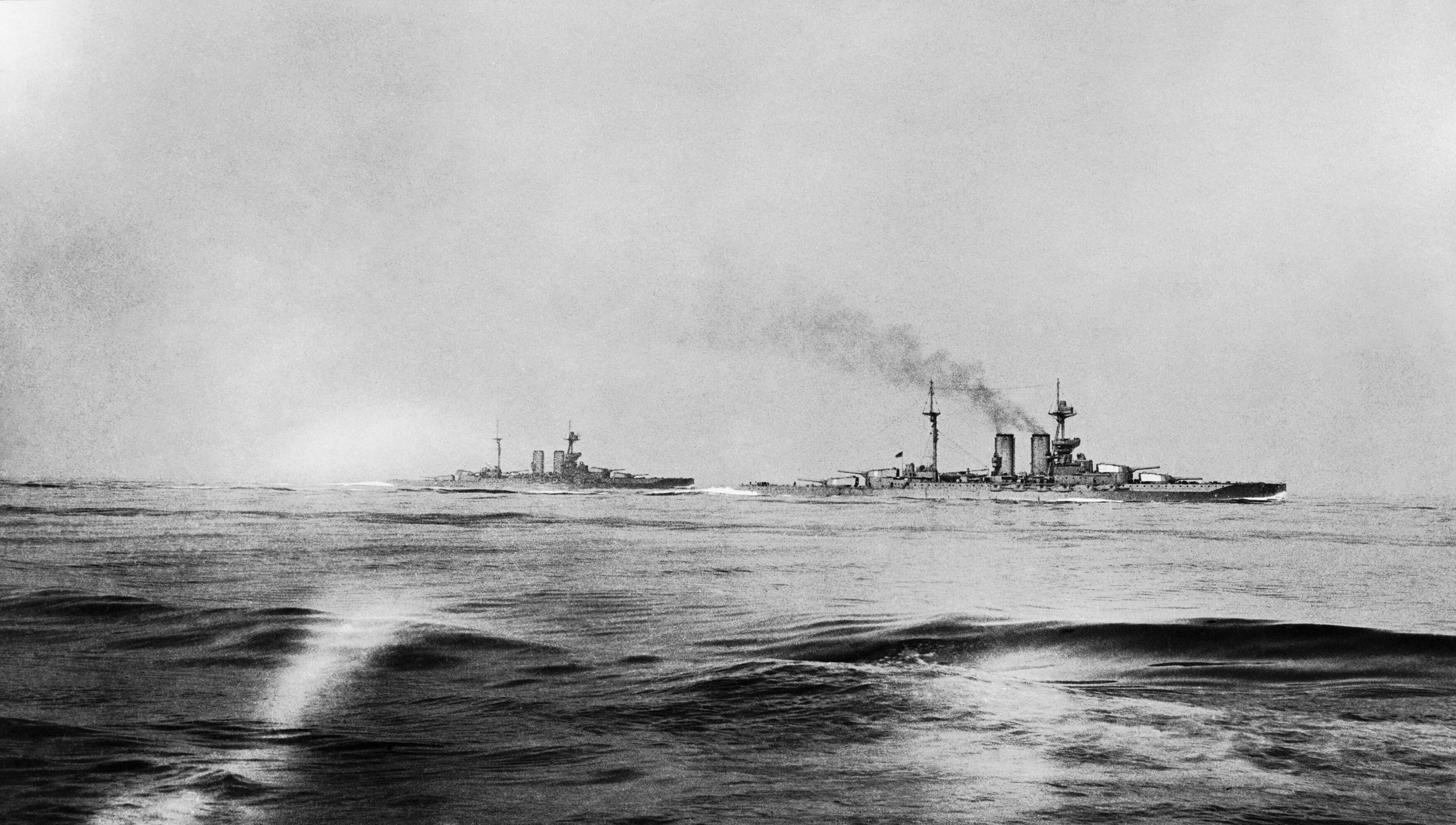
HMS Warspite and Malaya, seen from Valiant at the Battle of Jutland in 1916

During World War I, the Royal Navy's strength was mostly deployed at home in the Grand Fleet, confronting the German High Seas Fleet across the North Sea. Several inconclusive clashes took place between them, chiefly the Battle of Jutland in 1916. The British fighting advantage proved insurmountable, leading the High Seas Fleet to abandon any attempt to challenge British dominance. The Royal Navy under John Jellicoe also tried to avoid combat and remained in port at Scapa Flow for much of the war. This was contrary to widespread prewar expectations that in the event of a Continental conflict Britain would primarily provide naval support to the Entente Powers while sending at most only a small ground army. Nevertheless, the Royal Navy played an important role in securing the British Isles and the English Channel, notably ferrying the entire British Expeditionary Force to the Western Front at the beginning of the war without the loss of a single life.

The Royal Navy nevertheless remained active in other theatres, most notably in the Mediterranean Sea, where they waged the Dardanelles and Gallipoli campaigns in 1914 and 1915. British cruisers hunted down German commerce raiders across the world's oceans in 1914 and 1915, including the battles of Coronel, Falklands Islands, Cocos, and Rufiji Delta, among others.

=== Interwar period ===
At the end of World War I, the Royal Navy remained by far the world's most powerful navy, larger than the U.S. Navy and French Navy combined, and over twice as large as the Imperial Japanese Navy and Royal Italian Navy combined. Its former primary competitor, the Imperial German Navy, was destroyed at the end of the war. In the inter-war period, the Royal Navy was stripped of much of its power. The Washington and London Naval Treaties imposed the scrapping of some capital ships and limitations on new construction.

The lack of an imperial fortress in the region of Asia, the Indian Ocean, and the Pacific Ocean was always to be a weakness throughout the 19th century as the former North American colonies that had become the United States of America had multiplied towards the Pacific Coast of North America, and the Russian Empire and Japanese Empire both had ports on the Pacific and had begun building large, modern fleets which went to war with each other in 1904. Britain's reliance on Malta, via the Suez Canal, as the nearest Imperial fortress was improved, relying on amity and common interests that developed between Britain and the United States during and after World War I, by the completion of the Panama Canal in 1914, allowing the cruisers based in Bermuda to more easily and rapidly reach the eastern Pacific Ocean (after the war, the Royal Navy's Bermuda-based North America and West Indies Station was consequently re-designated the America and West Indies station), including a South American division. The rising power and increasing belligerence of the Japanese Empire after World War I, however, resulted in the construction of the Singapore Naval Base, which was completed in 1938, less than four years before hostilities with Japan did commence during World War II.

In 1931, the Invergordon Mutiny took place in the Atlantic Fleet over the National Government's proposed 25% pay cut, which was eventually reduced to 10%. International tensions increased in the mid-1930s and the re-armament of the Royal Navy was well under way by 1938. In addition to new construction, several existing old battleships, battlecruisers and heavy cruisers were reconstructed, and anti-aircraft weaponry reinforced, while new technologies, such as ASDIC, Huff-Duff and hydrophones, were developed.

=== World War II ===
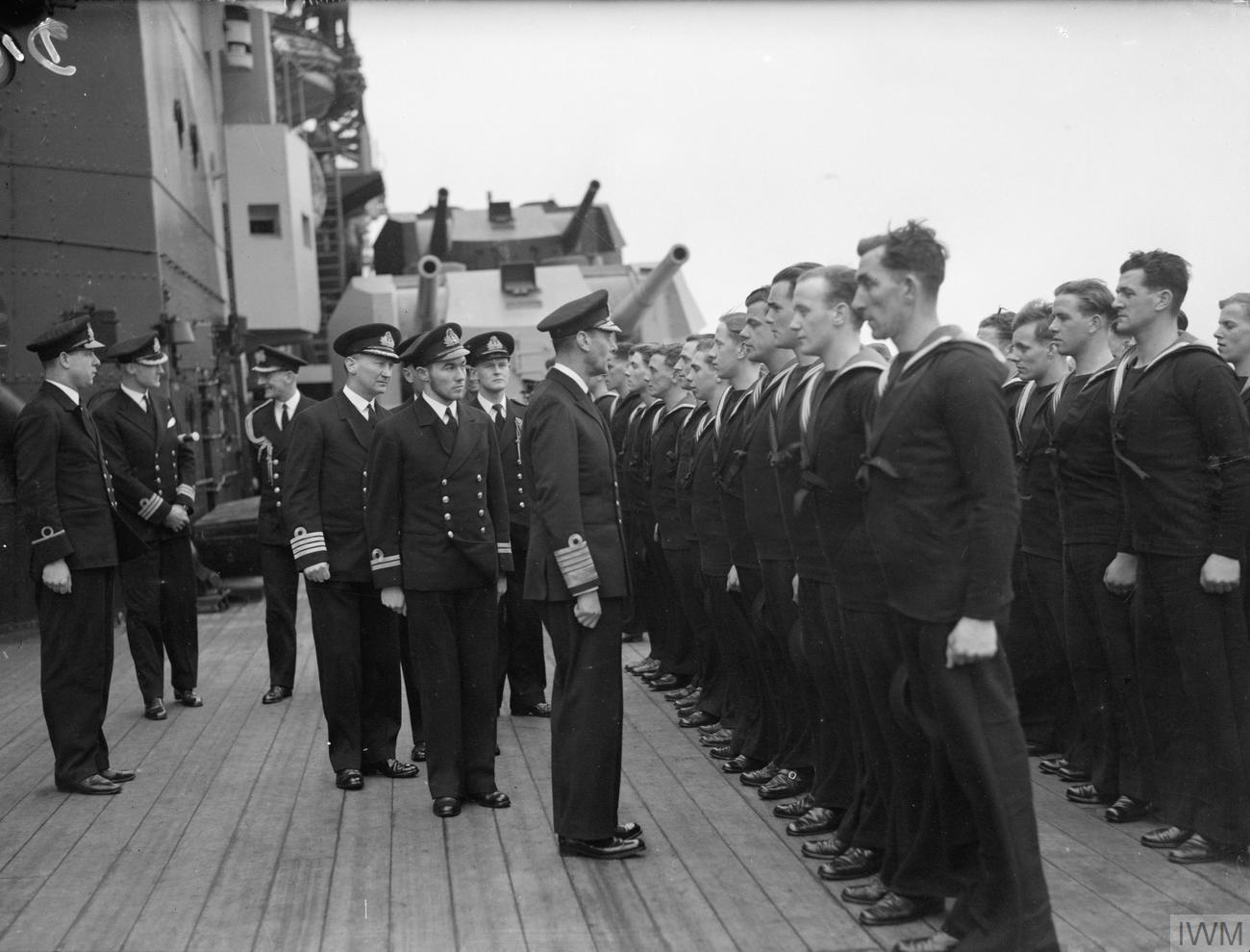
King George VI visiting the Home Fleet based at Scapa Flow, March 1943

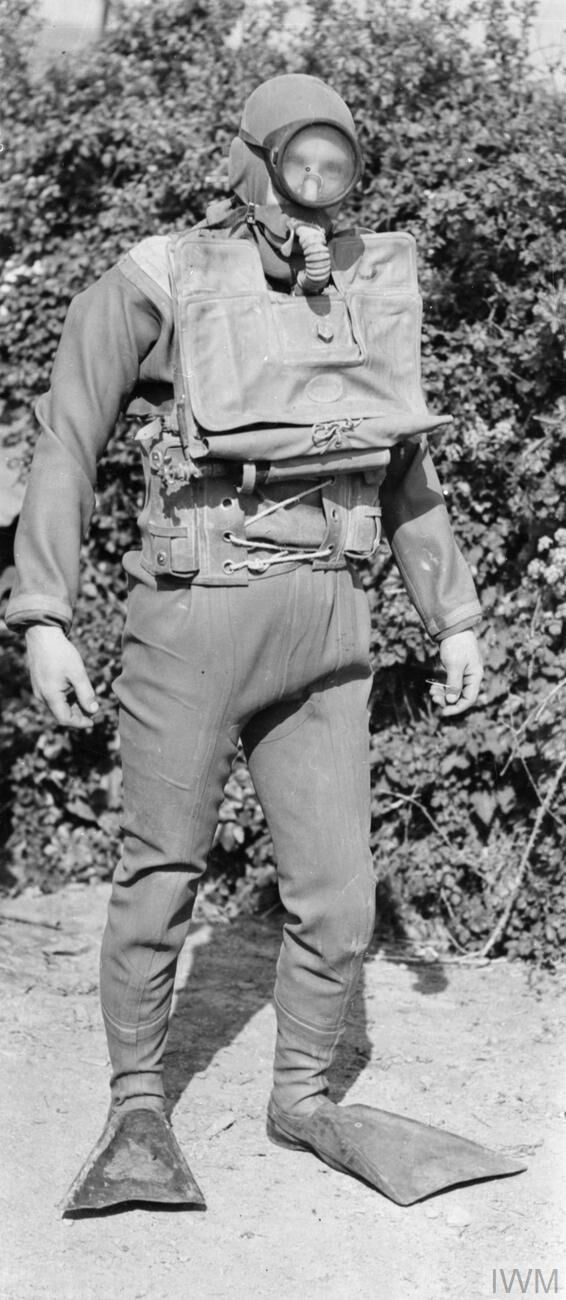
Royal Navy commando in 1945

At the start of World War II in 1939, the Royal Navy was still the largest in the world, with over 1,400 vessels. The Royal Navy provided critical cover during Operation Dynamo, the British evacuations from Dunkirk, and as the ultimate deterrent to a German invasion of Britain during the following four months. The Luftwaffe under Hermann Göring attempted to gain air supremacy over southern England in the Battle of Britain in order to neutralise the Home Fleet, but faced stiff resistance from the Royal Air Force. The Royal Navy's Fleet Air Arm assisted the Royal Air Force, which was suffering from personnel shortages, during the battle. The Luftwaffe bombing offensive during the Kanalkampf phase of the battle targeted naval convoys and bases in order to lure large concentrations of RAF fighters into attrition warfare. At Taranto, Admiral Cunningham commanded a fleet that launched the first all-aircraft naval attack in history. The Royal Navy suffered heavy losses in the first two years of the war. Over 3,000 people were lost when the converted troopship Lancastria was sunk in June 1940, the greatest maritime disaster in Britain's history. The Navy's most critical struggle was the Battle of the Atlantic defending Britain's vital North American commercial supply lines against U-boat attack. A traditional convoy system was instituted from the start of the war, but German submarine tactics, based on group attacks by "wolf-packs", were much more effective than in the previous war, and the threat remained serious for well over three years.

=== Cold War ===
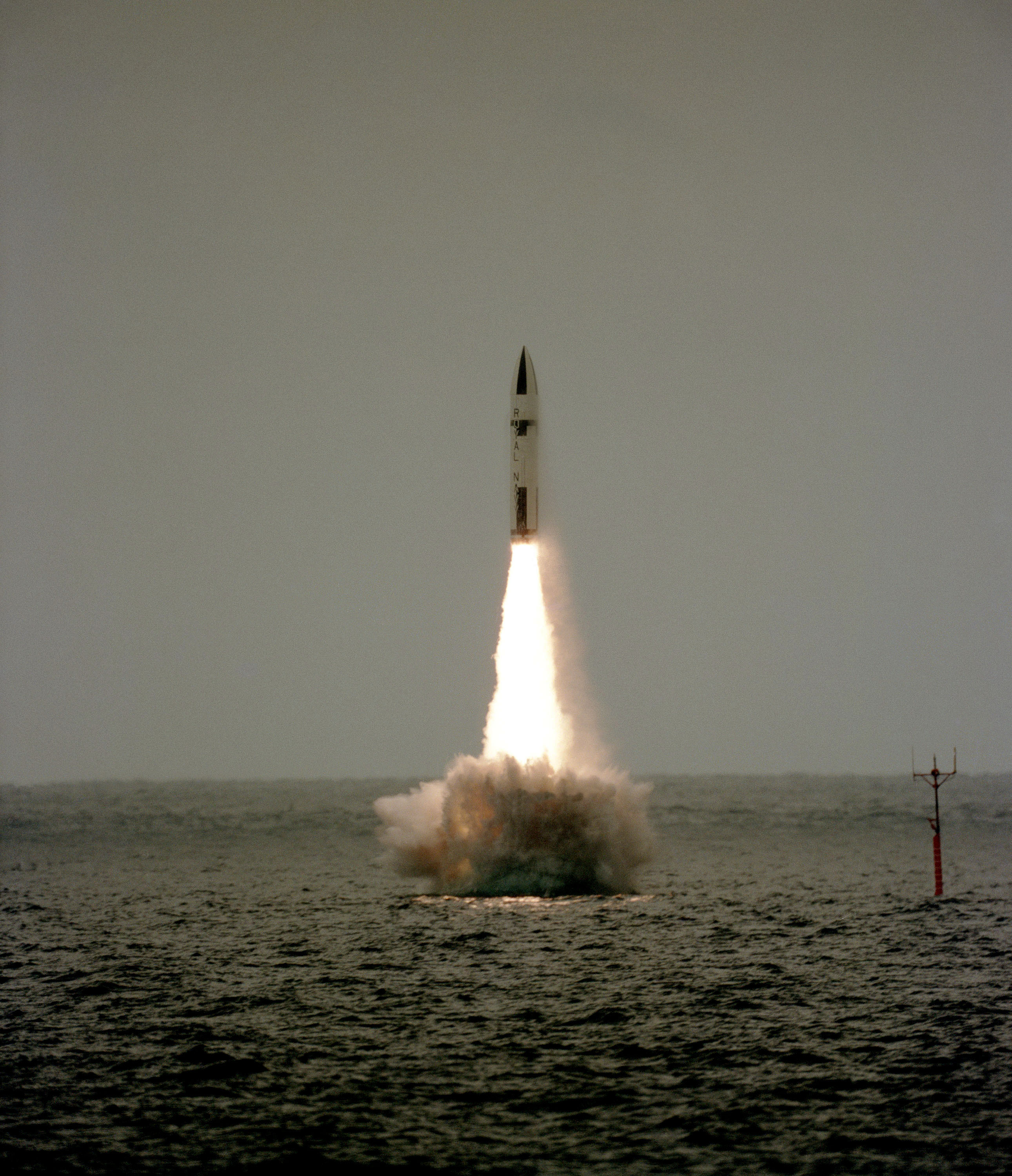
A Polaris missile is fired from the submerged British ballistic missile submarine HMS Revenge on 9 June 1983

After World War II, the decline of the British Empire and the economic hardships in Britain forced the reduction in the size and capability of the Royal Navy. The United States Navy instead took on the role of global naval power. Governments since have faced increasing budgetary pressures, partly due to the increasing cost of weapons systems.

In 1981, Defence Secretary John Nott had advocated and initiated a series of cutbacks to the Navy. The Falklands War however proved a need for the Royal Navy to regain an expeditionary and littoral capability which, with its resources and structure at the time, would prove difficult. At the beginning of the 1980s, the Royal Navy was a force focused on blue-water anti-submarine warfare. Its purpose was to search for and destroy Soviet submarines in the North Atlantic, and to operate the nuclear deterrent submarine force. The navy received its first nuclear weapons with the introduction of the first of the Resolution-class submarines armed with the Polaris missile.

=== Post-Cold War ===
Following the conclusion of the collapse of the Soviet Union and the end of the Cold War in 1991, the Royal Navy began to experience a gradual decline in its fleet size in accordance with the changed strategic environment it operated in. While new and more capable ships are continually brought into service, such as the Queen Elizabeth-class aircraft carriers, Astute-class submarines, and Type 45 destroyers, the total number of ships and submarines operated has continued to steadily reduce. This has caused considerable debate about the size of the Royal Navy. A 2013 report found that the Royal Navy was already too small, and that Britain would have to depend on her allies if her territories were attacked. As of December 2025, the entire Royal Navy comprised 63 commissioned ships, while the naval task force deployed to the Falklands in 1982 included 65 commissioned ships.

The Royal Navy was responsible for training the fledgling Iraqi Navy and securing Iraq's oil terminals following the cessation of hostilities in the country. The Iraqi Training and Advisory Mission (Navy) (Umm Qasr), headed by a Royal Navy captain, has been responsible for the former duty whilst Commander Task Force Iraqi Maritime, a Royal Navy commodore, was responsible for the latter. The mission ended in May 2011.

The financial costs attached to nuclear deterrence, including Trident missile upgrades and replacements, have become an increasingly significant issue for the navy.

== Assets and resources ==
=== Personnel ===
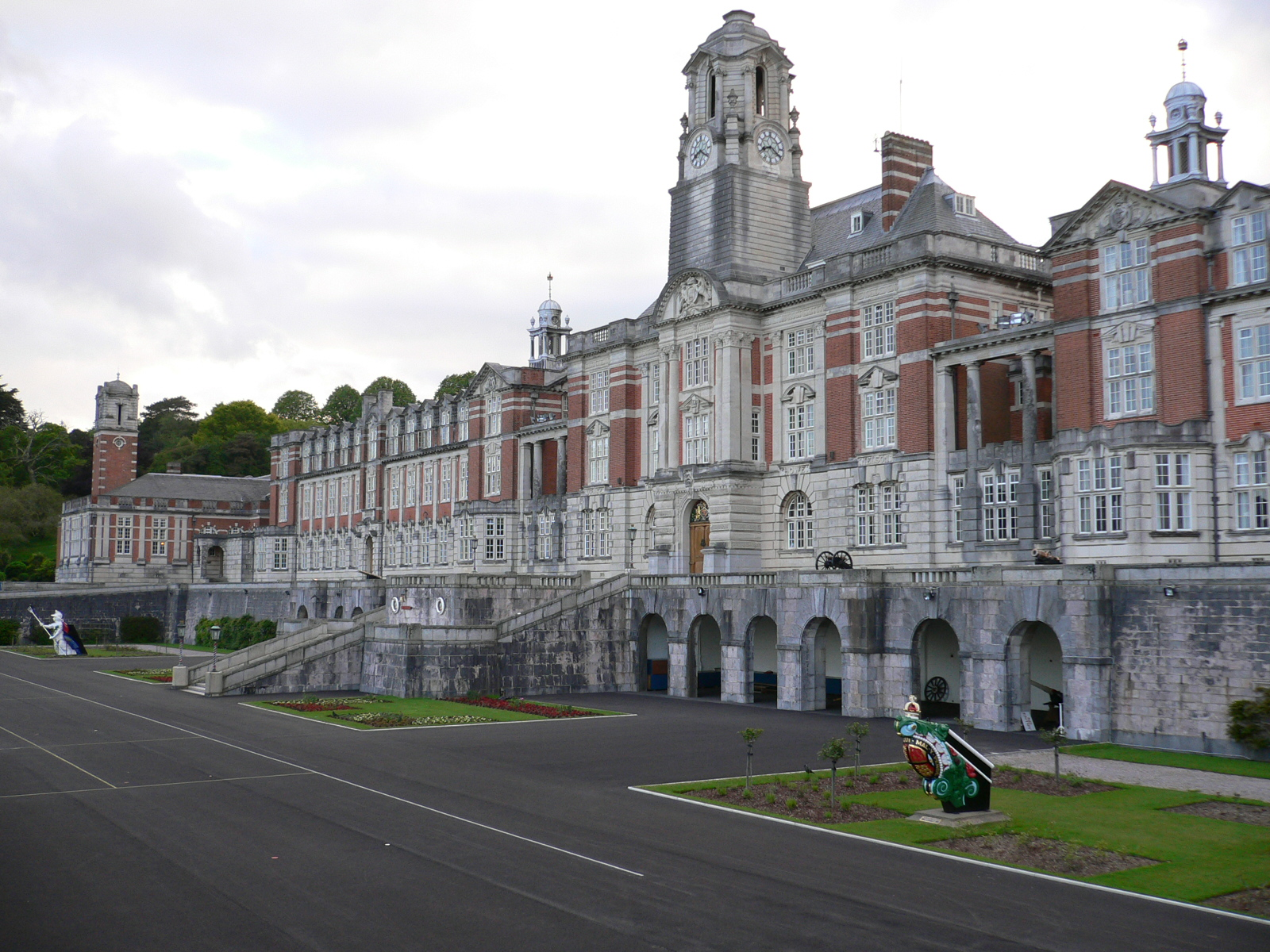
Britannia Royal Naval College in Dartmouth, Devon

HMS Raleigh at Torpoint, Cornwall, is the basic training facility for newly enlisted ratings. Britannia Royal Naval College in Dartmouth, Devon is the initial officer training establishment for the Royal Navy. Personnel are divided into a warfare branch, which includes Warfare Officers (previously named seamen officers) and Naval Aviators, as well other branches including the Royal Naval Engineers, Royal Navy Medical Branch, and Logistics Officers (previously named Supply Officers). Present-day officers and ratings have several different uniforms; some are designed to be worn aboard ship, others ashore or in ceremonial duties. Women began to join the Royal Navy in 1917 with the formation of the Women's Royal Naval Service (WRNS), which was disbanded after the end of the First World War in 1919. It was revived in 1939, and the WRNS continued until disbandment in 1993, as a result of the decision to fully integrate women into the structures of the Royal Navy. Women now serve in all sections of the Royal Navy including the Royal Marines.

In August 2019, the Ministry of Defence published figures showing that the Royal Navy and Royal Marines had 29,090 full-time trained personnel compared with a target of 30,600. In 2023, it was reported that the Royal Navy was experiencing significant recruiting challenges with a net drop of some 1,600 personnel (4 percent of the force) from mid-2022 to mid-2023. This was posing a significant problem in the ability of the navy to meet its commitments.

In December 2019 the First Sea Lord, Admiral Tony Radakin, outlined a proposal to reduce the number of Rear-Admirals at Navy Command by five. The fighting arms (excluding Commandant General Royal Marines) would be reduced to commodore (1-star) rank and the surface flotillas would be combined. Training would be concentrated under the Fleet Commander.

In 1952, Royal Navy ratings belonged to one of eleven branches: Seaman (may specialise as Boom Defence Rating; Gunnery Rating; Physical and Recreational Training Instructor; Quartermaster; Radar Plotter; Sailmaker; Surveying Recorder; Torpedo and Submarine Detection Rating); Naval Aviation (Aircraft Artificer; Aircraft Handler; Aircraft Mechanic (Airframes); Aircraft Mechanic (Engines); Aircraft Mechanic (Ordnance); Meteorological Observer; Photographer; Safety Equipment Rating); Communications (Signalman; Telegraphist); Shipwright (Shipwright Artificer); Electrical (Electrician; Electrician (Air); Electrical Artificer; Electrical Artificer (Air); Radio Electrical Artificer; Radio Electrical Artificer (Air); Radio Electrician; Radio Electrician (Air)); Engineering (Engine Room Artificer; Stoker Mechanic); Ordnance (Ordnance Artificer); Regulating (Master-at-Arms; Patrol Rating); Supply and Secretarial (Cook; Steward; Stores Rating; Writer); Medical (Laboratory Assistant; Operating Room Assistant; Physiotherapist (Masseur); Radiographer; Sanitary Inspector; Sick Berth Attendant); and Dental (Dental Surgery Attendant).

=== Surface fleet ===
==== Aircraft carriers ====
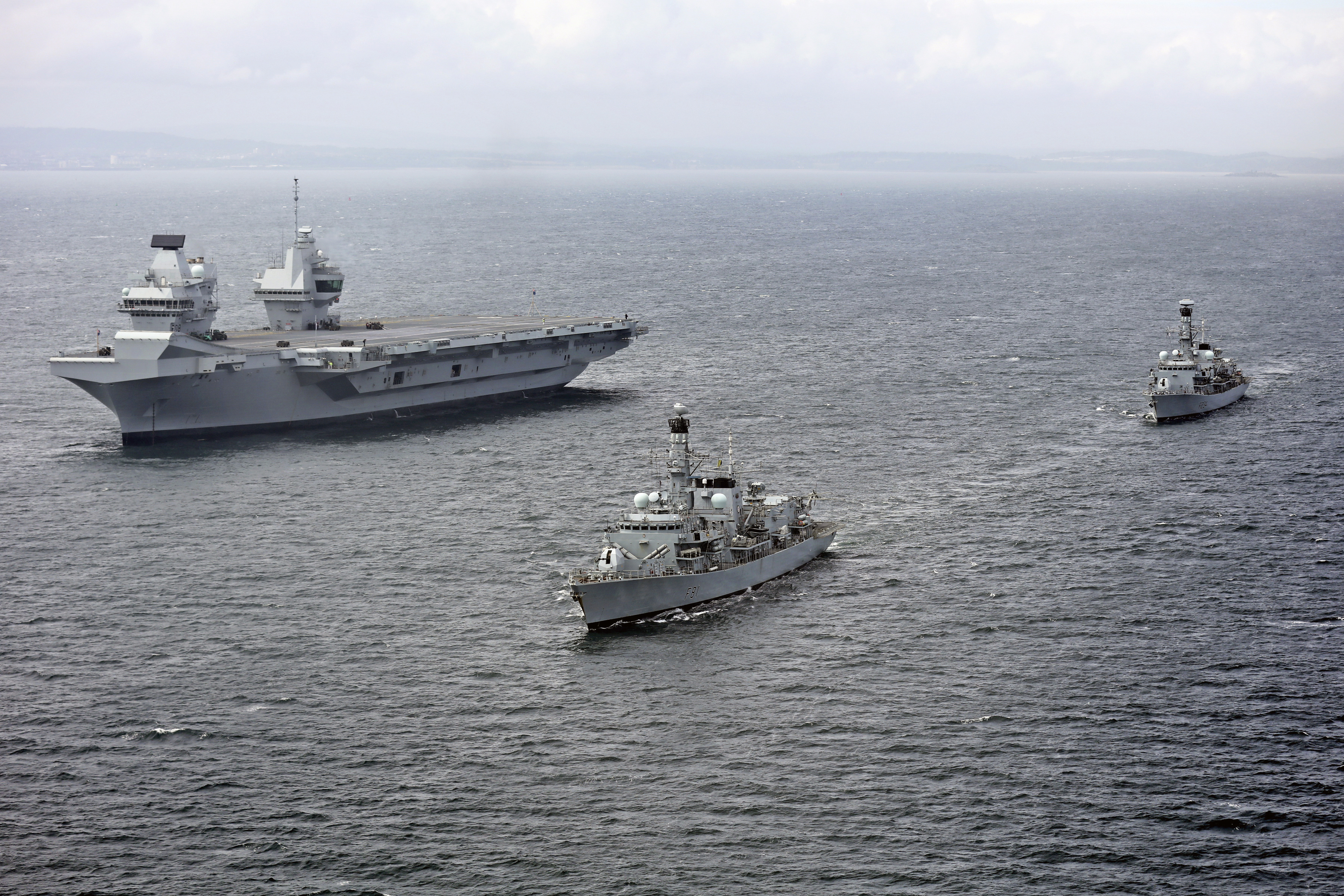
HMS Queen Elizabeth, a Queen Elizabeth-class aircraft carrier, on sea trials in June 2017

The Royal Navy has two Queen Elizabeth-class aircraft carriers. Each carrier cost £3.2 billion and has an empty load displacement of 65,000 tonnes (64,000 long tons; 72,000 short tons), rising up to an estimated 80,600 tonnes (79,300 long tons; 88,800 short tons) full load displacement. Both are intended to operate the short take-off and landing (STOVL) variant of the F-35 Lightning II. The first, HMS Queen Elizabeth, commenced flight trials in 2018. Queen Elizabeth began sea trials in June 2017, was commissioned later that year, and entered service in 2020, while the second, HMS Prince of Wales, began sea trials on 22 September 2019, was commissioned in December 2019 and was declared operational as of October 2021. The aircraft carriers form a central part of the UK Carrier Strike Group alongside escorts and support ships.

==== Amphibious warfare ====
Until 2024/25, the Royal Navy's amphibious capability consisted of two landing platform docks (HMS Albion and HMS Bulwark). While their primary role was to conduct amphibious warfare, they were also deployed for humanitarian aid missions. Both vessels were in reserve as of 2024 and in November 2024, the newly elected Labour government indicated that they would in fact be retired from service completely by March 2025. While second-line amphibious capabilities remained within the Royal Fleet Auxiliary, the future of the navy's amphibious capability was now in question.

==== Clearance diving ====
The Royal Navy clearance diving unit, the Fleet Diving Squadron, consists of five squadrons:

- Alpha Squadron
- Bravo Squadron
- Delta Squadron
- Echo Squadron
- Gibraltar Squadron

The Royal Navy has a separate unit with divers the special forces unit the Special Boat Service.

==== Escort fleet ====
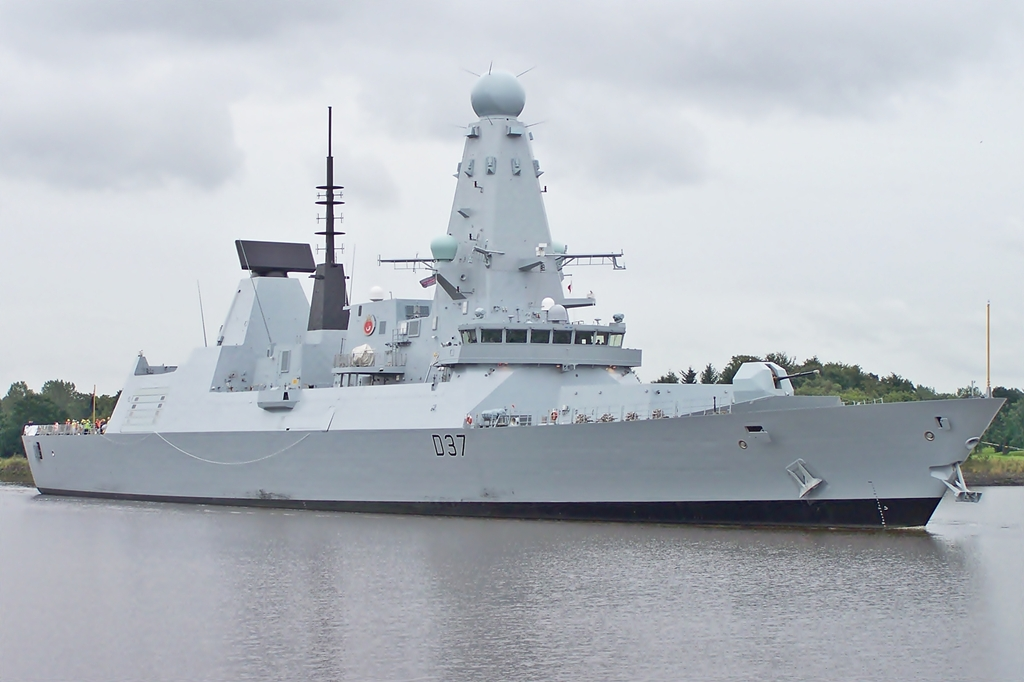
HMS Duncan, the Type 45 guided missile destroyer

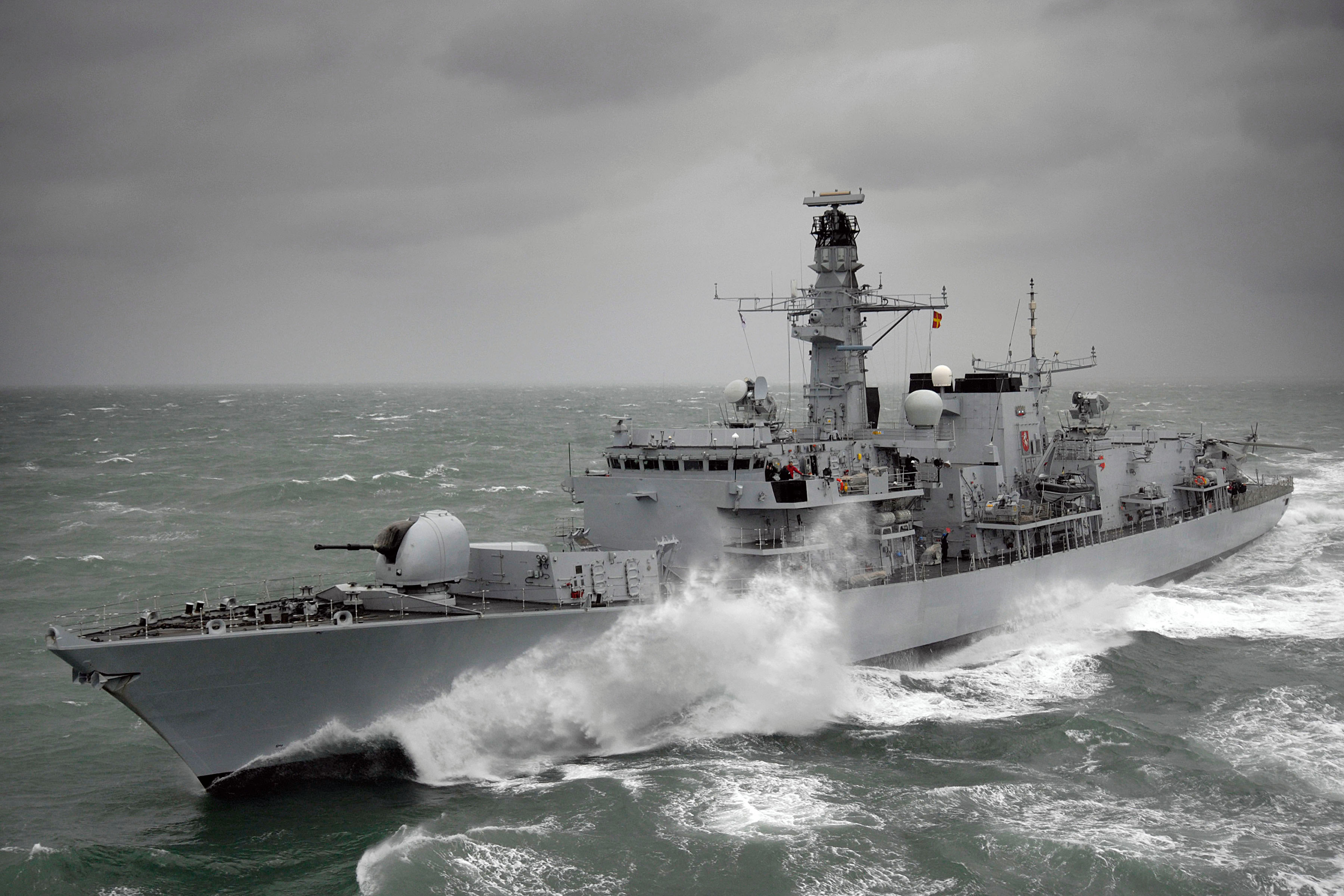
HMS Kent, the Type 23 frigate designed for anti-submarine warfare

The escort fleet comprises guided missile destroyers and frigates and is the traditional workhorse of the Navy. Since the end of the Cold War in 1990, the escort fleet has declined from around 50 vessels to only 11. As of July 2026 there are six Type 45 destroyers and five Type 23 frigates in commission and active. Among their primary roles is to provide escort for the larger capital ships—protecting them from air, surface and subsurface threats. Other duties include undertaking the Royal Navy's standing deployments across the globe, which often consists of: counter-narcotics, anti-piracy missions and providing humanitarian aid.

The Type 45 is primarily designed for anti-aircraft and anti-missile warfare and the Royal Navy describe the destroyer's mission as "to shield the Fleet from air attack". They are equipped with the PAAMS (also known as Sea Viper) integrated anti-aircraft warfare system which incorporates the sophisticated SAMPSON and S1850M long range radars and the Aster 15 and 30 missiles.

Sixteen Type 23 frigates were delivered to the Royal Navy, with the final vessel, HMS St Albans, commissioned in June 2002. However, the 2004 Delivering Security in a Changing World review announced that three frigates would be paid off as part of a cost-cutting exercise, and these were subsequently sold to the Chilean Navy. The 2010 Strategic Defence and Security Review announced that the remaining 13 Type 23 frigates would eventually be replaced by the Type 26 Frigate, with the incremental retirement of the remaining Type 23s commencing in 2021. The Strategic Defence and Security Review 2015 reduced the procurement of Type 26 to eight with five Type 31e frigates also to be procured.

As part of the Maritime Electronic Warfare System Integrated Capability (MEWSIC) programme, the Ministry of Defence awarded a £100 million contract in 2022 to a consortium led by Babcock International, with Qinetiq and Elbit Systems UK, a subsidiary of the Israel-based defence technology company Elbit Systems. The 13-year programme is intended to upgrade the Royal Navy's electronic warfare capabilities, particularly against threats such as anti-ship missiles. By 2025, testing of the new systems was underway, with full integration planned for platforms including the Type 45, Type 26, and Type 31 frigates.

==== Mine countermeasure vessels (MCMV) ====
There are two classes of traditional MCMVs in the Royal Navy: one Sandown-class minehunter and five Hunt-class mine countermeasures vessels. Crewed mine countermeasures vessels are in the process of being incrementally replaced by autonomous systems, such as the Arcims-class and vessels being procured from Thales defence systems. It is planned that these systems may operate from a range of vessels, including so-called "motherships". The first of these 'motherships', HMS Stirling Castle, was transferred to the Royal Navy from the Royal Fleet Auxiliary in 2025. The Hunt-class vessels combine the separate roles of the traditional minesweeper and the active minehunter in one hull. If required, crewed MCMVs can also take on the role of offshore patrol vessels.

==== Offshore patrol vessels (OPV) ====
A fleet of eight River-class offshore patrol vessels are in service with the Royal Navy. The three Batch 1 ships of the class serve in U.K. waters in a sovereignty and fisheries protection role while the five Batch 2 ships are forward-deployed on a long-term basis to Gibraltar, the Caribbean, the Falkland Islands and the Indo-Pacific region. The vessel MV Grampian Frontier is leased from Scottish-based company North Star Shipping for patrol duties around the British Indian Ocean Territory. However, she is not in commission with the Royal Navy.

In December 2019, the modified Batch 1 River-class vessel, HMS Clyde, was decommissioned, with the Batch 2 HMS Forth taking over duties as the Falkland Islands patrol ship.

==== Survey ships ====
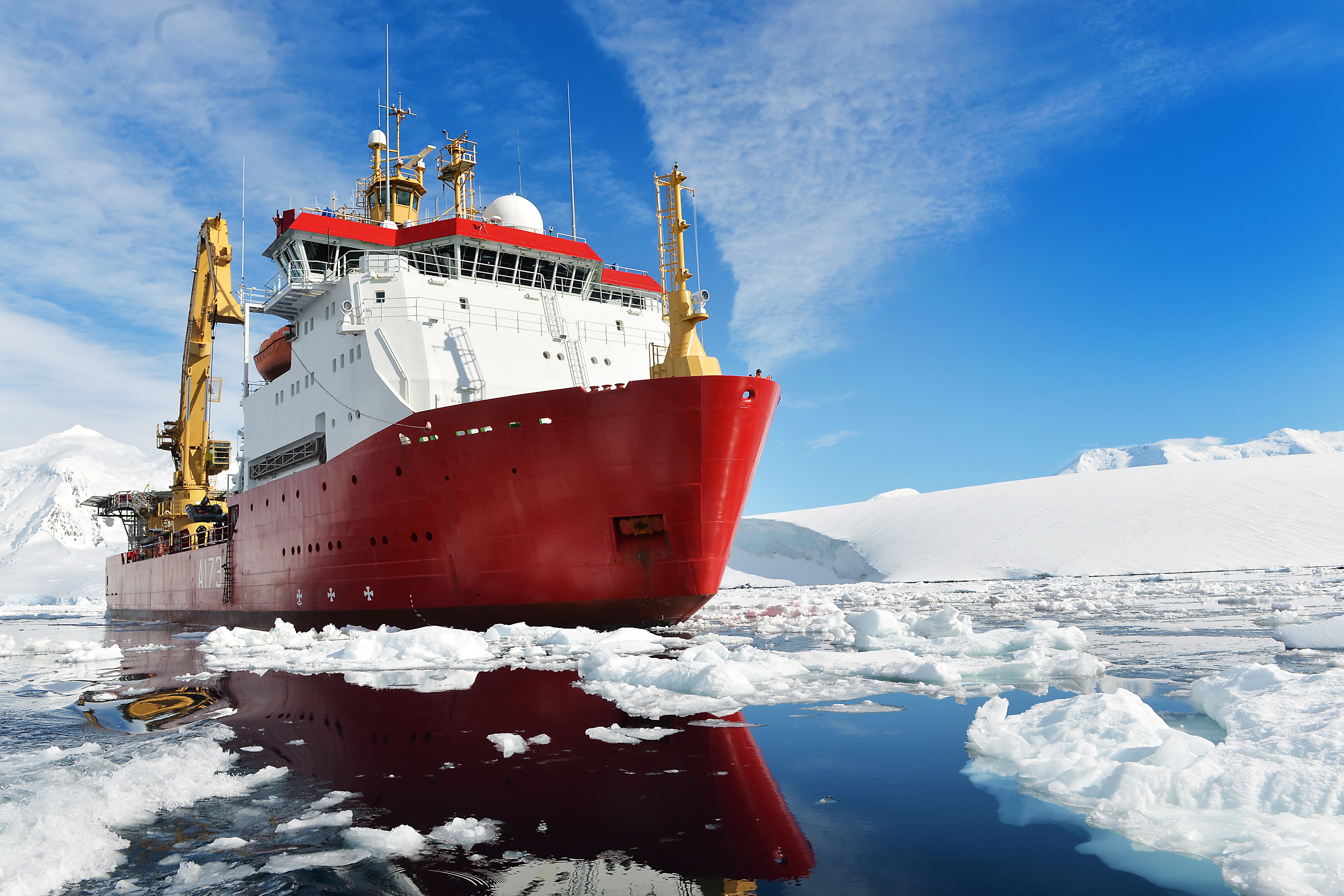
HMS Protector, a Royal Navy Antarctic patrol ship

HMS Protector is a dedicated Antarctica patrol ship that fulfils the nation's mandate to provide support to the British Antarctic Survey (BAS). HMS Scott is an ocean survey vessel and at 13,500 tonnes is one of the largest ships in the Navy. As of 2018, the newly commissioned HMS Magpie also undertakes survey duties at sea. The Royal Fleet Auxiliary had planned to introduce two new Multi-Role Ocean Surveillance Ships, in part to protect undersea cables and gas pipelines and partly to compensate for the withdrawal of all ocean-going survey vessels from Royal Navy service. The first of these vessels, RFA Proteus, entered service in October 2023. However, the 2026 Defence Investment Plan did not indicate that any additional vessels would be acquired.

==== Royal Fleet Auxiliary ====
The Royal Fleet Auxiliary (RFA) provides support to the Royal Navy at sea in several capacities. For fleet replenishment, it deploys one Fleet Solid Support Ship (in reserve as of late 2024) and four Tide-class fleet tankers.

Three amphibious transport docks are also incorporated within its fleet. These are known as the Bay-class landing ships, of which four were introduced in 2006–2007, but one was sold to the Royal Australian Navy in 2011. In November 2006, the then First Sea Lord Admiral Sir Jonathon Band described the Royal Fleet Auxiliary vessels as "a major uplift in the Royal Navy's war fighting capability".

In February 2023, a commercial vessel was also acquired to act as a Multi-Role Ocean Surveillance Ship (MROSS) for the protection of critical seabed infrastructure and other tasks. She entered service as RFA Proteus. An additional vessel, RFA Stirling Castle, was acquired in 2023 to act as a mothership for autonomous minehunting systems. This ship was transferred from the Royal Fleet Auxiliary to the Royal Navy in 2025.

==== Other ships and boats ====
The Royal Navy also includes a number of smaller non-commissioned assets such as the Sea-class workboats. The Fleet Experimentation Squadron, within the Disruptive Capabilities and Technologies Office, operates a number of vessels and systems to trial high technology military capabilities. These include vessels such as XV Excalibur, an Extra Large Uncrewed Submarine christened in 2025. On 29 July 2022, the Royal Navy christened a new experimental ship, XV Patrick Blackett, which it aims to use as a testbed for autonomous systems. Whilst the ship flies the Blue Ensign, it is crewed by Royal Navy personnel and will participate in Royal Navy and NATO exercises.

In November 2026, the Royal Navy formed the '1st Autonomous Squadron' to operate uncrewed boats on frontline operations. Initially the Squadron is being equipped with the Kraken K3 Scout USV (8.5 metres long with a top speed of 55 knots and a range of 650 to 1,100 miles) and the Rattler uncrewed vehicle (based on a Rigid Inflatable Boat and used for training). Operating in the counter drone interceptor role one Scout can carry a Saab Giraffe 1X radar while others can be equipped with counter-drone interceptors. In this role the USVs are reportedly envisaged as forming an outer air defence screen ahead of a carrier or Type 45 destroyer.

==== Future ships ====
The 2026 Defence Investment Plan placed a heavy emphasis on the acquisition of new autonomous systems. For the Royal Navy this is to involve the procurement of several vessel types:

- the Type 91 "uncrewed missile platform" ("to increase the firepower of the Hybrid Fleet");
- the Type 92 "uncrewed underwater sensing platform" (or uncrewed Sloop "designed to hunt enemy submarines across the North Atlantic, supporting our new frigates");
- the Type 93 Extra Large Uncrewed Underwater Vessel (XLUUV); and,
- the Type 94 "uncrewed sensor platform" (or uncrewed Radar picket vessel "designed to scan the skies for threats to the hybrid navy or the homeland").

Six "Common Combat Vessels" are envisaged to act as the "brain of a networked Maritime Air Defence system". The first prototypes are envisaged being procured by 2030.

=== Submarine Service ===
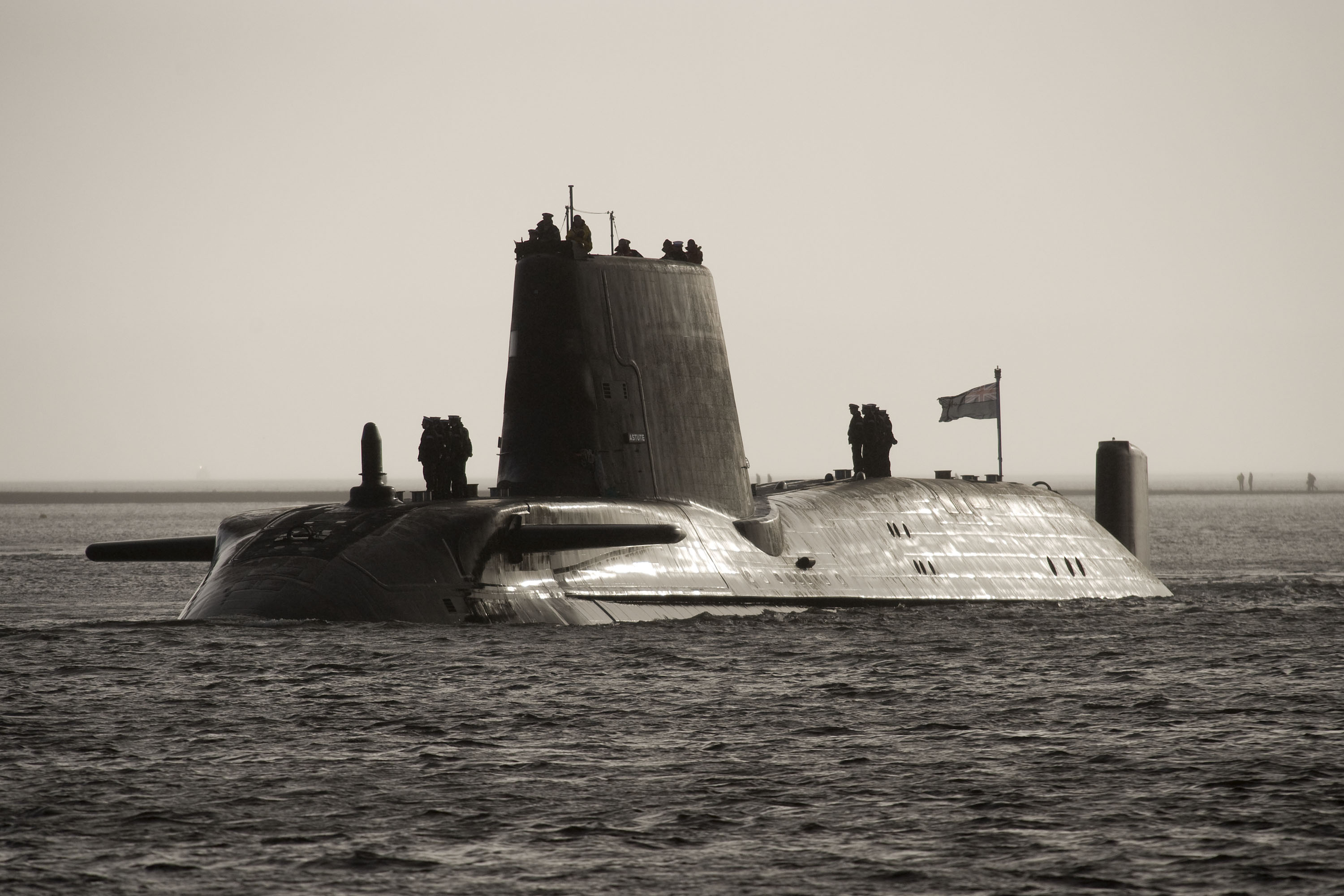
HMS Astute, the first Astute-class nuclear submarine

The Submarine Service is the submarine based element of the Royal Navy. It is sometimes referred to as the "Silent Service", as the submarines are generally required to operate undetected. Founded in 1901, the service made history in 1982 when, during the Falklands War, HMS Conqueror became the first nuclear-powered submarine to sink a surface ship, ARA General Belgrano. Today, all of the Royal Navy's submarines are nuclear-powered.

==== Ballistic missile submarines (SSBN) ====
The Royal Navy operates four Vanguard-class ballistic missile submarines displacing nearly 16,000 tonnes and equipped with Trident II missiles (armed with nuclear weapons) and heavyweight Spearfish torpedoes, to carry out Operation Relentless, the United Kingdom's Continuous At Sea Deterrent (CASD). The UK government has committed to replace these submarines with four new Dreadnought-class submarines, which will enter service in the "early 2030s" to maintain this capability.

==== Fleet submarines (SSN) ====
As of September 2025, six fleet submarines of the Astute-class are in commission with the previous Trafalgar class submarines having been withdrawn from service. Another Astute-class fleet submarine is scheduled to enter service by the late-2020s.

The Astute-class, at 7,400 tonnes, carry both Tomahawk land-attack missiles and Spearfish torpedoes. In 2025, HMS Agamemnon was the most recent Astute-class boat to be commissioned, though it will be at least another 12 to 18 months before she is fully operational.

=== Fleet Air Arm ===
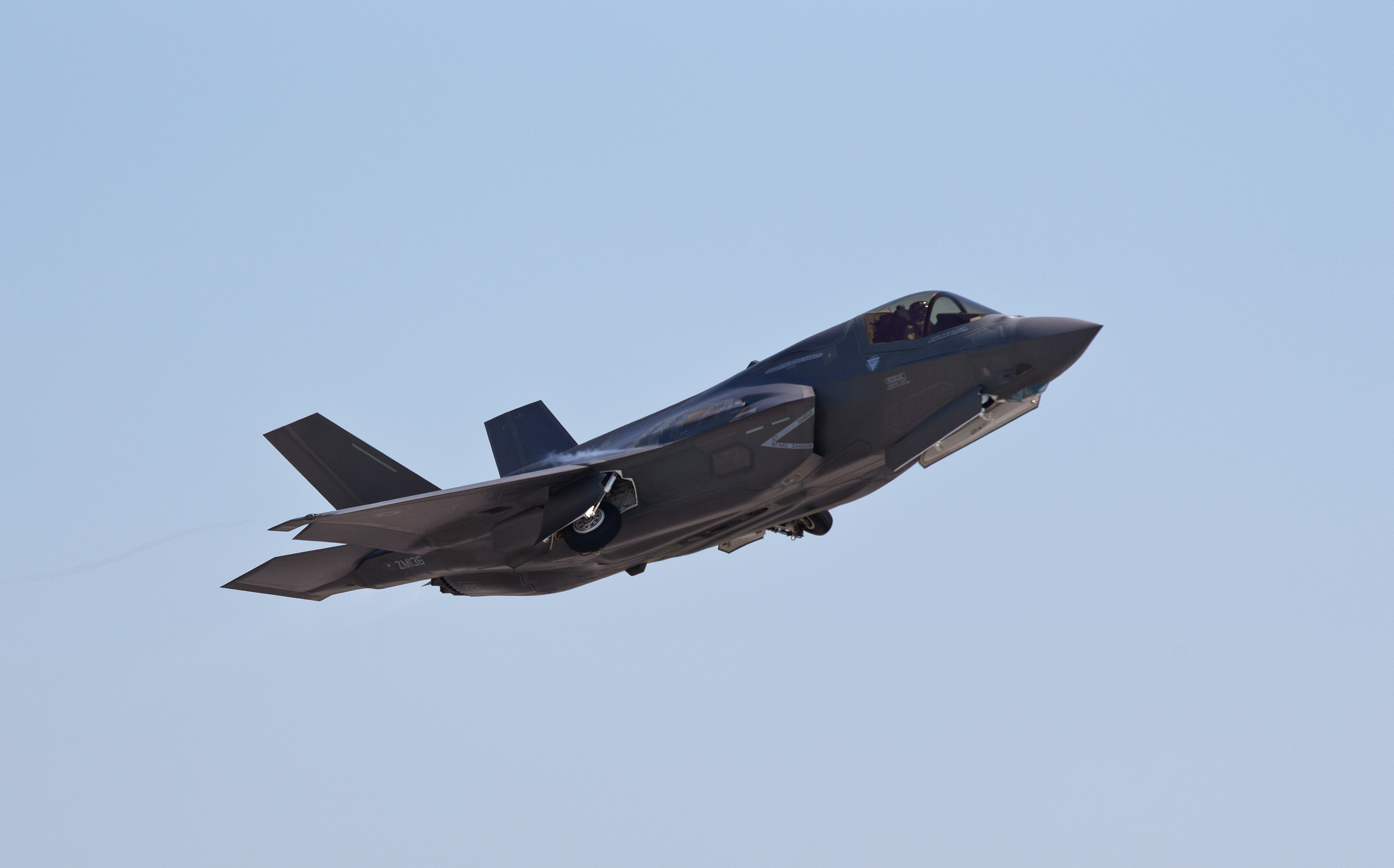
F-35B aircraft are operated from the Queen Elizabeth-class aircraft carriers

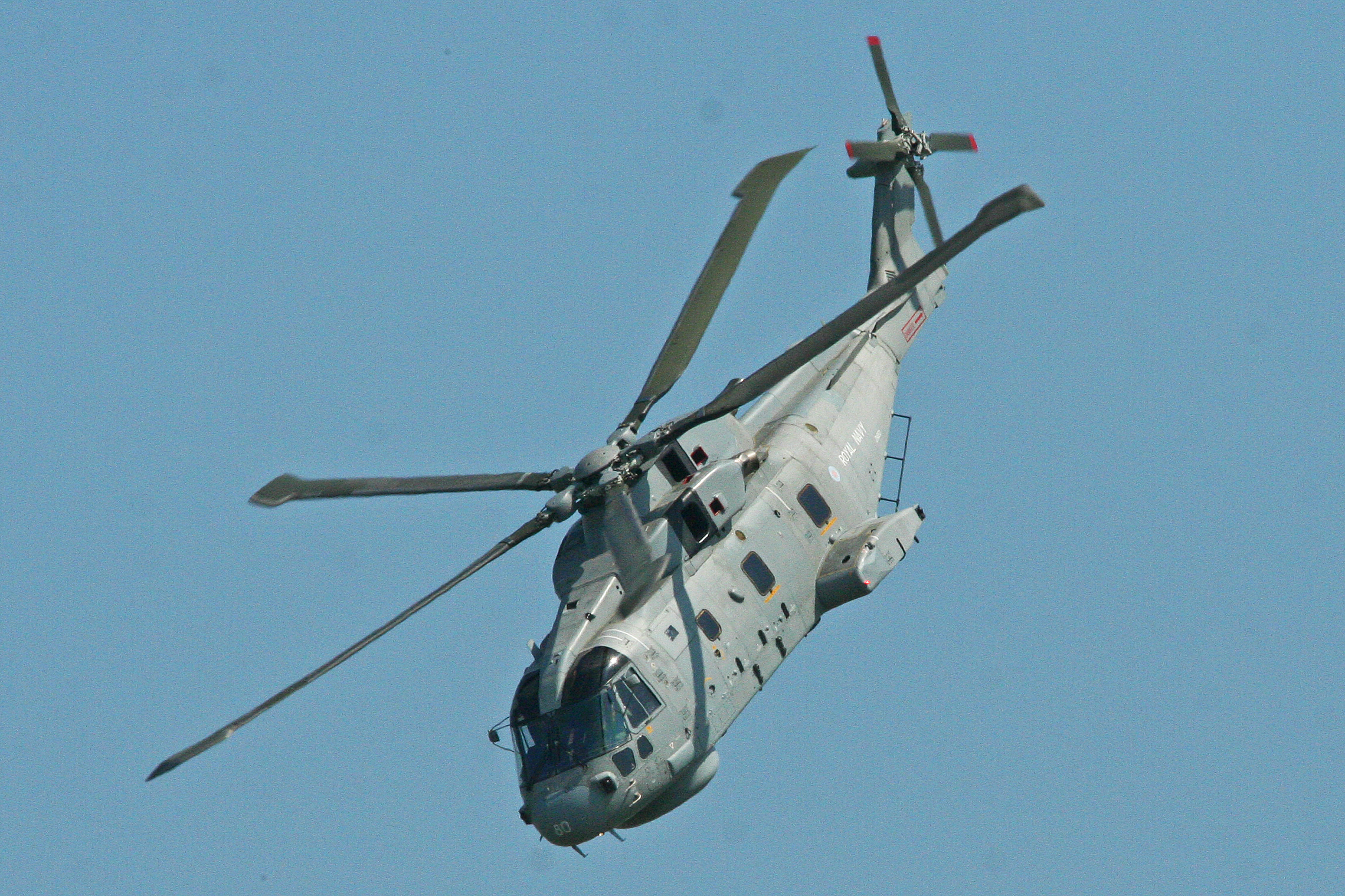
AW-101 Merlin HM2 anti-submarine warfare helicopter

The Fleet Air Arm (FAA) is recognised as one of the five fighting arms of the Royal Navy and oversees the operations of naval aircraft.

Established officially within the Royal Navy in 1939, the Fleet Air Arm has been instrumental in naval combat, offering aerial support for fleet missions, performing reconnaissance tasks, and executing offensive operations against both maritime and land-based objectives.

The contemporary Fleet Air Arm functions as an essential element of the Royal Navy's combat capabilities. Its main responsibilities encompass:

- Carrier Strike Operations: Operating the fixed-wing F-35B Lightning II, the FAA equips the Royal Navy with a long-range strike capability. These aircraft are launched from the Queen Elizabeth-class aircraft carriers.
- Maritime Surveillance and Reconnaissance: AW-101 Merlin HM2 and AW-159 Wildcat HMA2 helicopters are utilised for anti-submarine warfare (ASW), anti-surface warfare (ASuW), and intelligence-gathering missions.
- Search and Rescue (SAR) and Humanitarian Missions: The FAA has a longstanding tradition of engaging in Search and Rescue operations and disaster relief efforts, frequently in partnership with international allies.
- Littoral Strike Support: The FAA plays a vital role in amphibious warfare, delivering essential air support for Royal Marines and other ground forces. The FAA operates the AW-101 Merlin HC4 and AW-159 Wildcat AH1 (in support of UK Commando Force) as the Commando Helicopter Force.

Pilots designated for rotary wing service train under No. 1 Flying Training School (1 FTS) at RAF Shawbury.

=== Royal Marines ===
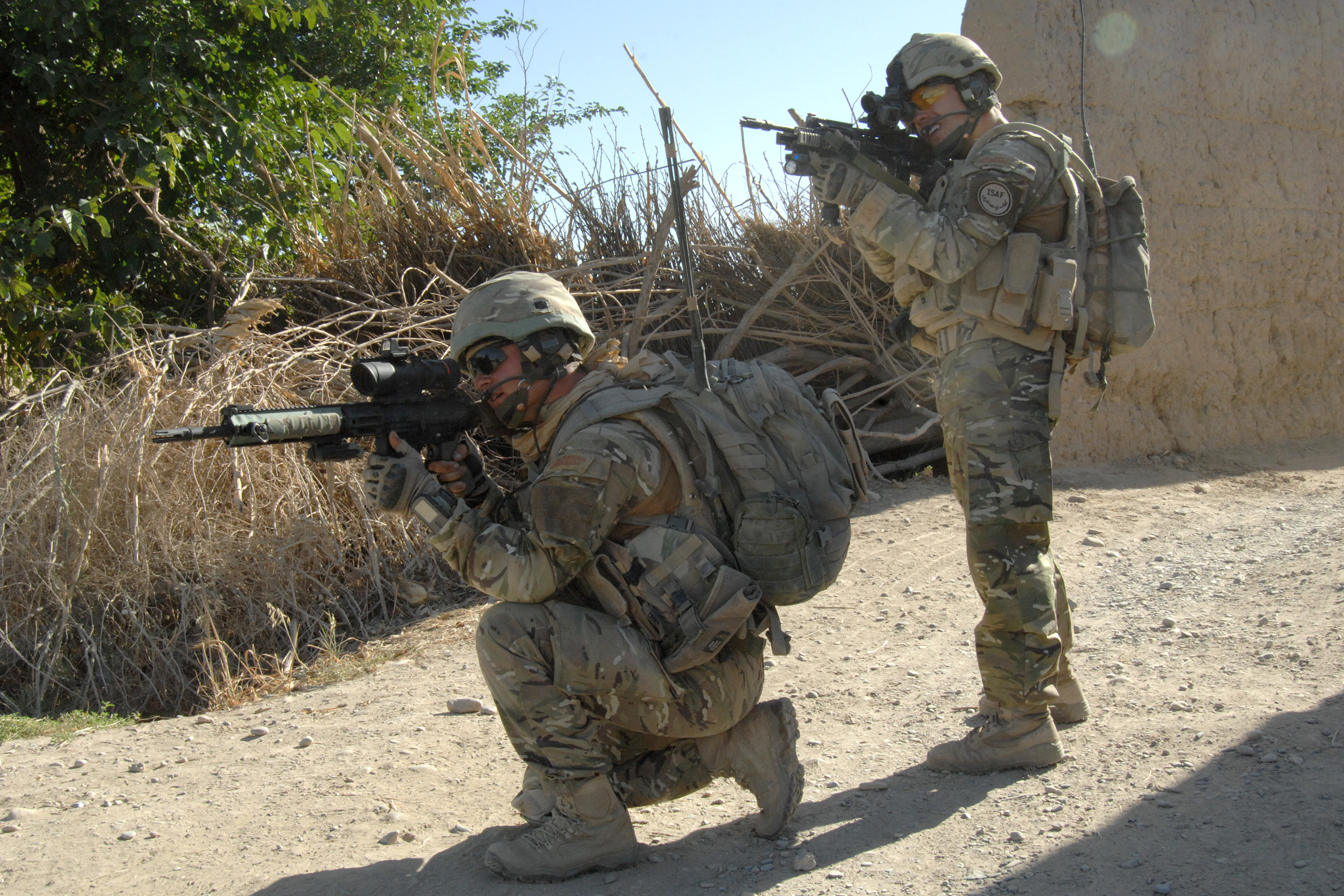
Royal Marines in Sangin in Afghanistan in 2010

The Royal Marines are an amphibious, specialised light infantry force of commandos, capable of deploying at short notice in support of His Majesty's Government's military and diplomatic objectives overseas. The Royal Marines are organised into a highly mobile light infantry brigade (UK Commando Force) and 7 commando units including 47 Commando (Raiding Group) Royal Marines, 43 Commando Fleet Protection Group Royal Marines and a company strength commitment to the Special Forces Support Group. The Corps operates in all environments and climates, though particular expertise and training is spent on amphibious warfare, Arctic warfare, mountain warfare, expeditionary warfare and commitment to the UK's Rapid Reaction Force. The Royal Marines are also the primary source of personnel for the Royal Navy's special forces unit the Special Boat Service (SBS).

The Corps operates its own fleet of landing and other craft, and also incorporates the Royal Marines Band Service, the musical wing of the Royal Navy.

The Royal Marines have seen constant action since they were formed, often fighting beside the British Army; including in the Seven Years' War, the Napoleonic Wars, the Crimean War, World War I and World War II. Most has been offshore away from the United Kingdom. In recent times, the Corps has been deployed in the Falklands War, the Gulf War, the Bosnian War, the Kosovo War, the Sierra Leone Civil War, the Iraq War and the War in Afghanistan (2001–2021). The Royal Marines have international ties with allied marine forces, particularly the United States Marine Corps and the Netherlands Marine Corps/Korps Mariniers.

== Command, control and organisation ==
The Sovereign is the Commander-in-chief of the British Armed Forces. (Note: Historically, members of the Royal Navy 'entered' service (rather than enlisted) and did not swear an oath of allegiance as the Navy's existence stems from the Sovereign's prerogative rather than an act of parliament. However, since the Armed Forces Act 2006, ratings have 'enlisted' in line with the other services and are required to take the oath or affirmation. Commissioned officers of the Royal Navy are still not required to take the oath or affirmation.) The titular head of the Royal Navy is the Lord High Admiral of the United Kingdom, a position which was held by Prince Philip, Duke of Edinburgh from 2011 until his death in 2021 and which remains in the reigning monarch's gift. The position had been held by Queen Elizabeth II from 1964 to 2011. The prime minister of the United Kingdom is de facto commander-in-chief of the armed forces, with the Secretary of State for Defence the minister permanently responsible. The professional head of the Naval Service is the First Sea Lord and Chief of Naval Staff (1SL/CNS), a member of the Defence Council of the United Kingdom. The Defence Council delegates management of the Naval Service to the Admiralty Board, chaired by the secretary of state for defence, which directs the Navy Board, a sub-committee of the Admiralty Board comprising only naval officers and Ministry of Defence (MOD) civil servants. These are all based in the Ministry of Defence Main Building in London, where the First Sea Lord & CNS is supported by the Naval Staff.

=== Organisation ===
The Fleet Commander has responsibility for the provision of ships, submarines and aircraft ready for any operations that the Government requires. Fleet Commander exercises his authority through the Navy Command Headquarters, based at HMS Excellent in Portsmouth. Day-to-day operational command of ships, aircraft and Royal Marines is split: large deployed operations such as United Kingdom Carrier Strike Group 21 (Operation Fortis) often fall under the Permanent Joint Headquarters of the United Kingdom's armed forces, at Northwood in the northwest suburbs of London; while across the same site at the Northwood Headquarters, Commander Operations (Royal Navy) supervises individual ships on independent activities and the patrolling Vanguard-class submarine. The UK retains control of the NATO functional Allied Maritime Command, also on the same site.

The Royal Navy was the first of the three armed forces to combine the personnel and training command, under the Principal Personnel Officer, with the last remaining operational command, combining the Headquarters of the Commander-in-Chief, Fleet and Naval Home Command into a single organisation, Fleet Command, in 2005 and becoming Navy Command in 2008. The Second Sea Lord acts as the Principal Personnel Officer. Previously, Flag Officer Sea Training was part of the list of top senior appointments in Navy Command, however, as part of the Navy Command Transformation Programme, the post has reduced from Rear-Admiral to Commodore, renamed as Commander Fleet Operational Sea Training.

The Naval Command senior appointments are:

| Rank | Name | Position |
Professional Head of the Royal Navy
| General | Sir Gwyn Jenkins | First Sea Lord and Chief of the Naval Staff |
Fleet Commander
| Vice Admiral | Steve Moorhouse | Fleet Commander |
| Major General | Rich Cantrill | Commander Operations |
| Rear Admiral | Robert Pedre | Commander United Kingdom Strike Force |
Second Sea Lord & Deputy Chief of Naval Staff
| Vice Admiral | Paul Beattie | Second Sea Lord & Deputy Chief of the Naval Staff |
| Rear Admiral | James Parkin | Assistant Chief of Naval Staff (Capability) and Director Development |
| Major General | Paul Maynard | Director Strategy and Policy |
| Rear Admiral | Jude Terry | Director People and Training / Naval Secretary |
| The Venerable | Andrew Hillier | Chaplain of the Fleet |

The Commandant General Royal Marines was previously a major-general's post and charged with leading amphibious warfare operations. Since Lieutenant General Robert Magowan was appointed for the second time the post is an additional responsibility for a senior Royal Marine holding other duties. The current CG RM is General Sir Gwyn Jenkins, the First Sea Lord.

Intelligence support to fleet operations is provided by intelligence sections at the various headquarters and from MOD Defence Intelligence, renamed from the Defence Intelligence Staff in early 2010.

=== Current deployments ===
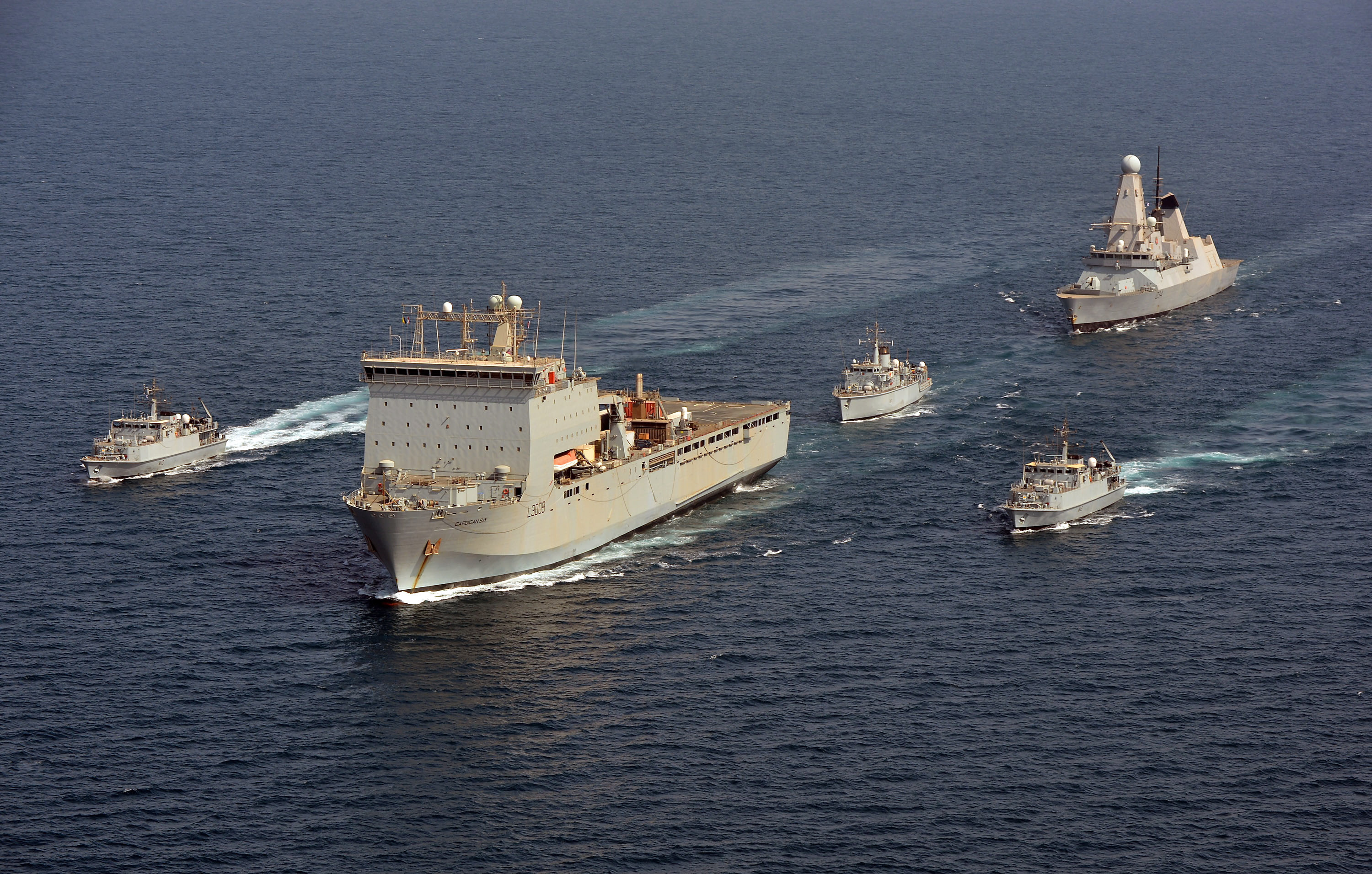
The Royal Navy's presence in the Persian Gulf typically includes a Type 45 destroyer and a squadron of minehunters supported by an RFA Bay-class mothership.

The Royal Navy is currently deployed in different areas of the world, including some standing Royal Navy deployments. These include several home tasks as well as overseas deployments. The Navy is deployed in the Mediterranean as part of standing NATO deployments including mine countermeasures and NATO Maritime Group 2. In both the North and South Atlantic, RN vessels are patrolling. There is always a River-class patrol vessel deployed in the South Atlantic.

The Royal Navy operates a Response Force Task Group (a product of the 2010 Strategic Defence and Security Review), which is poised to respond globally to short-notice tasking across a range of defence activities, such as non-combatant evacuation operations, disaster relief, humanitarian aid or amphibious operations. In 2011, the first deployment of the task group occurred under the name 'COUGAR 11' which saw them transit through the Mediterranean where they took part in multinational amphibious exercises before moving further east through the Suez Canal for further exercises in the Indian Ocean.

In the Persian Gulf, and until 2025/26, the RN has sustained commitments in support of both national and coalition efforts to stabilise the region. Operation Kipion had been the navy's primary activity in the Gulf region. The Royal Navy has also contributed to the US-led Combined Maritime Forces in the Gulf in partnership with the United States. The UK Maritime Component Commander, overseer of all of His Majesty's warships in the Persian Gulf and surrounding waters, is also deputy commander of the Combined Maritime Forces. However, as of 2025/26, these forces were withdrawn and it was unclear how or whether they would be replaced.

The Royal Navy contributes to standing NATO formations and maintains forces as part of the NATO Response Force. The RN also has a long-standing commitment to supporting the Five Powers Defence Arrangements countries and occasionally deploys to the Far East as a result. This deployment typically consists of a frigate and a survey vessel, operating separately. Operation Atalanta, the European Union's anti-piracy operation in the Indian Ocean, is permanently commanded by a senior Royal Navy or Royal Marines officer at Northwood Headquarters and the navy contributes ships to the operation.

From 2015, the Royal Navy also re-formed its UK Carrier Strike Group (UKCSG) after it was disbanded in 2011 due to the retirement of HMS Ark Royal and Harrier GR9s. The Queen Elizabeth-class aircraft carriers form the central part of this formation, supported by various escorts and support ships, with the aim to facilitate carrier-enabled power projection. The UKCSG first assembled at sea in October 2020 as part of a rehearsal for its first operational deployment in 2021.

In 2019, the Royal Navy announced the formation of two Littoral Response Groups as part of a transformation of its amphibious forces. These forward-based special operations-capable task groups were to be rapidly-deployable and able to carry out a range of tasks within the littoral, including raids and precision strikes. The first one, based in Europe, became operational in 2021, whilst the second was to be ready for deployment in the Indo-Pacific from 2023. They centred around the two navy amphibious assault ships, amphibious auxiliary ships from the Royal Fleet Auxiliary, elements from the Royal Marines and supporting units. However, in November 2024, with the government's decision to retire the Albion-class assault ships along with the subsequent retirement of RFA Argus, these plans were no longer viable.

=== Locations ===
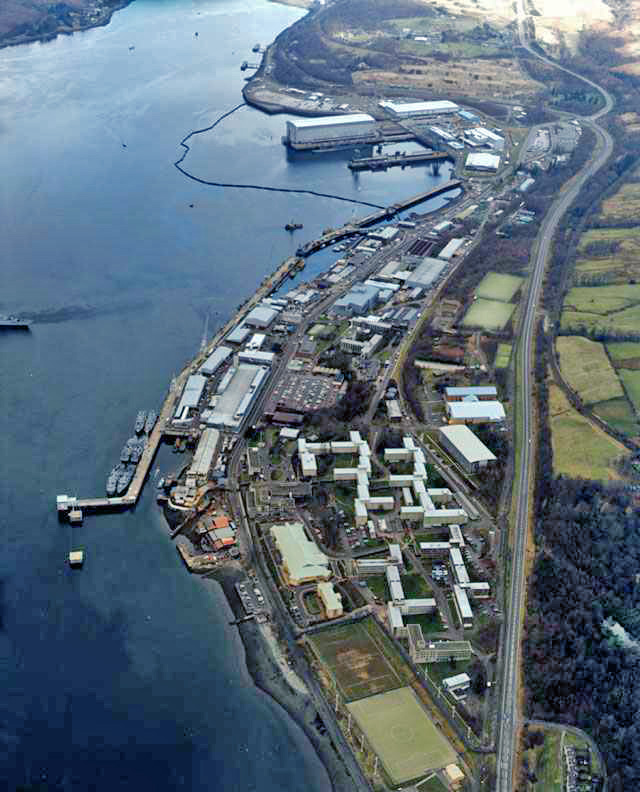
HMNB Clyde, Faslane, home of the Vanguard-class submarines

Historically the Navy had a number of geographical commands, each under a Commander-in-Chief, and often informally referred to as "stations". Over 300 years to 1971 these commands were repeatedly reduced in number, until they were merged into a single entity. The former stations of the Royal Navy included the East Indies Station (1744–1831); East Indies and China Station (1832–1865); East Indies Station (1865–1913); Egypt and East Indies Station (1913–1918); East Indies Station (1918–1941). Later the Eastern Fleet became the East Indies Fleet. In 1952, after the Second World War ended, the East Indies Fleet became the Far East Fleet. In 1971 the final merger into a single fleet took place with Far East Fleet merged into the larger single formation under the orders of the Commander-in-Chief Fleet (CINCFLEET).

The Royal Navy currently operates from three bases in the United Kingdom where commissioned ships are based; Portsmouth, Clyde and Devonport — Devonport is the largest operational naval base in the UK and Western Europe. Each base hosts a flotilla command under a commodore, responsible for the provision of operational capability using the ships and submarines within the flotilla. UK Commando Force is similarly commanded by a brigadier and based in Plymouth.

The Royal Navy has historically maintained Royal Navy Dockyards around the world. Dockyards of the Royal Navy are harbours where ships are overhauled and refitted. Only four are operating today; at Devonport, Faslane, Rosyth and at Portsmouth. A Naval Base Review was undertaken in 2006 and early 2007, the outcome being announced by Secretary of State for Defence, Des Browne, confirming that all would remain however some reductions in manpower were anticipated.

The academy where initial training for future Royal Navy officers takes place is Britannia Royal Naval College, located on a hill overlooking Dartmouth, Devon. Basic training for future ratings takes place at HMS Raleigh at Torpoint, Cornwall, close to HMNB Devonport.

Significant numbers of naval personnel are employed within the Ministry of Defence, Defence Equipment and Support and on exchange with the Army and Royal Air Force. Small numbers are also on exchange within other government departments and with allied fleets, such as the United States Navy. The navy also posts personnel in small units around the world to support ongoing operations and maintain standing commitments. Nineteen personnel are stationed in Gibraltar to support the small Gibraltar Squadron, the RN's only permanent overseas squadron. Some personnel are also based at East Cove Military Port and RAF Mount Pleasant in the Falkland Islands to support APT(S). Small numbers of personnel are based in Diego Garcia (Naval Party 1002), Miami (NP 1011 – AUTEC), Singapore (NP 1022), Dubai (NP 1023) and elsewhere.

On 6 December 2014, the Foreign and Commonwealth Office announced it would expand the UK's naval facilities in Bahrain to support larger Royal Navy ships deployed to the Persian Gulf. Once completed, it became the UK's first permanent military base located East of Suez since it withdrew from the region in 1971. The base is reportedly large enough to accommodate Type 45 destroyers and Queen Elizabeth-class aircraft carriers.

==== Bases in the United Kingdom ====
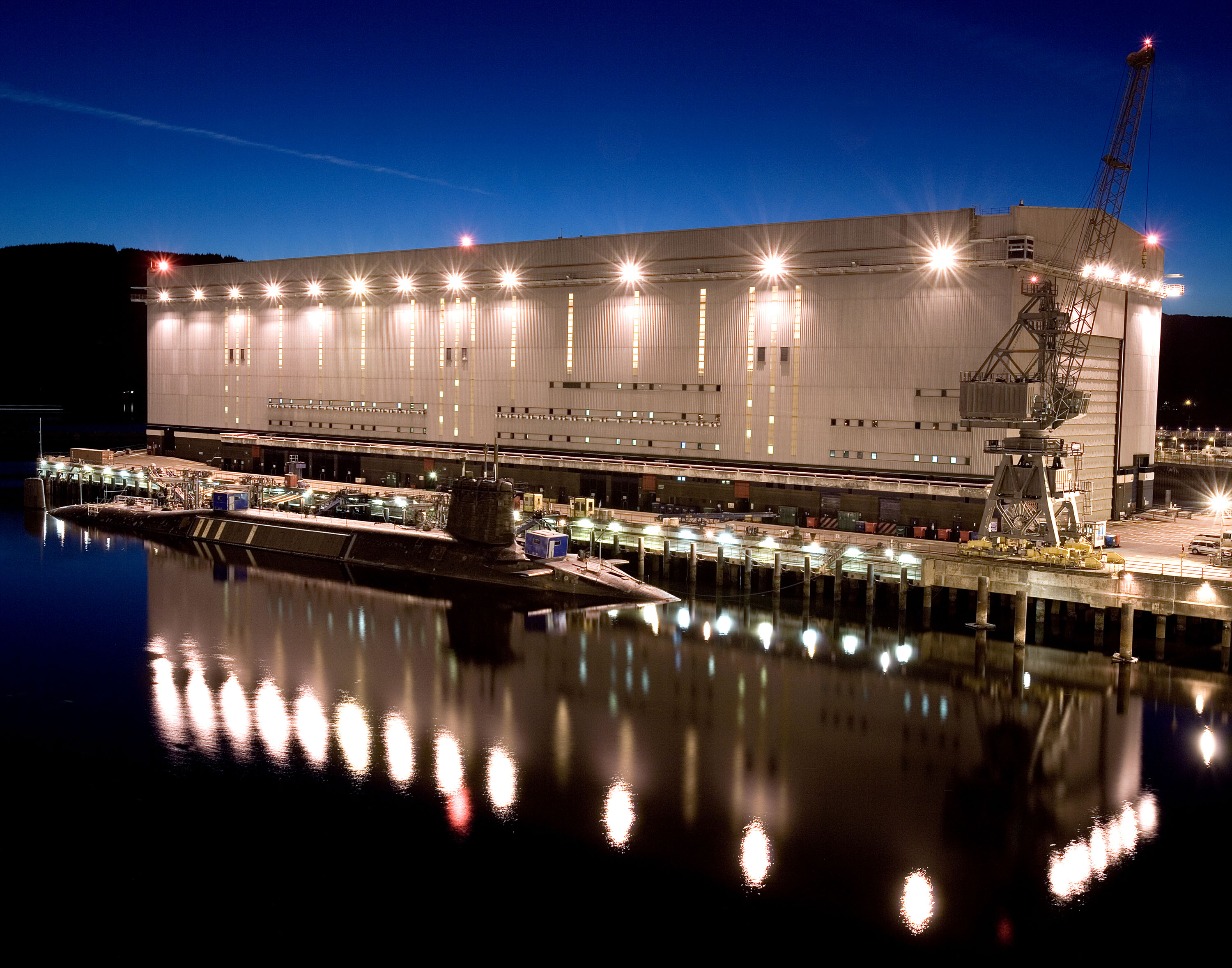
HMS Vigilant alongside Faslane Naval Base

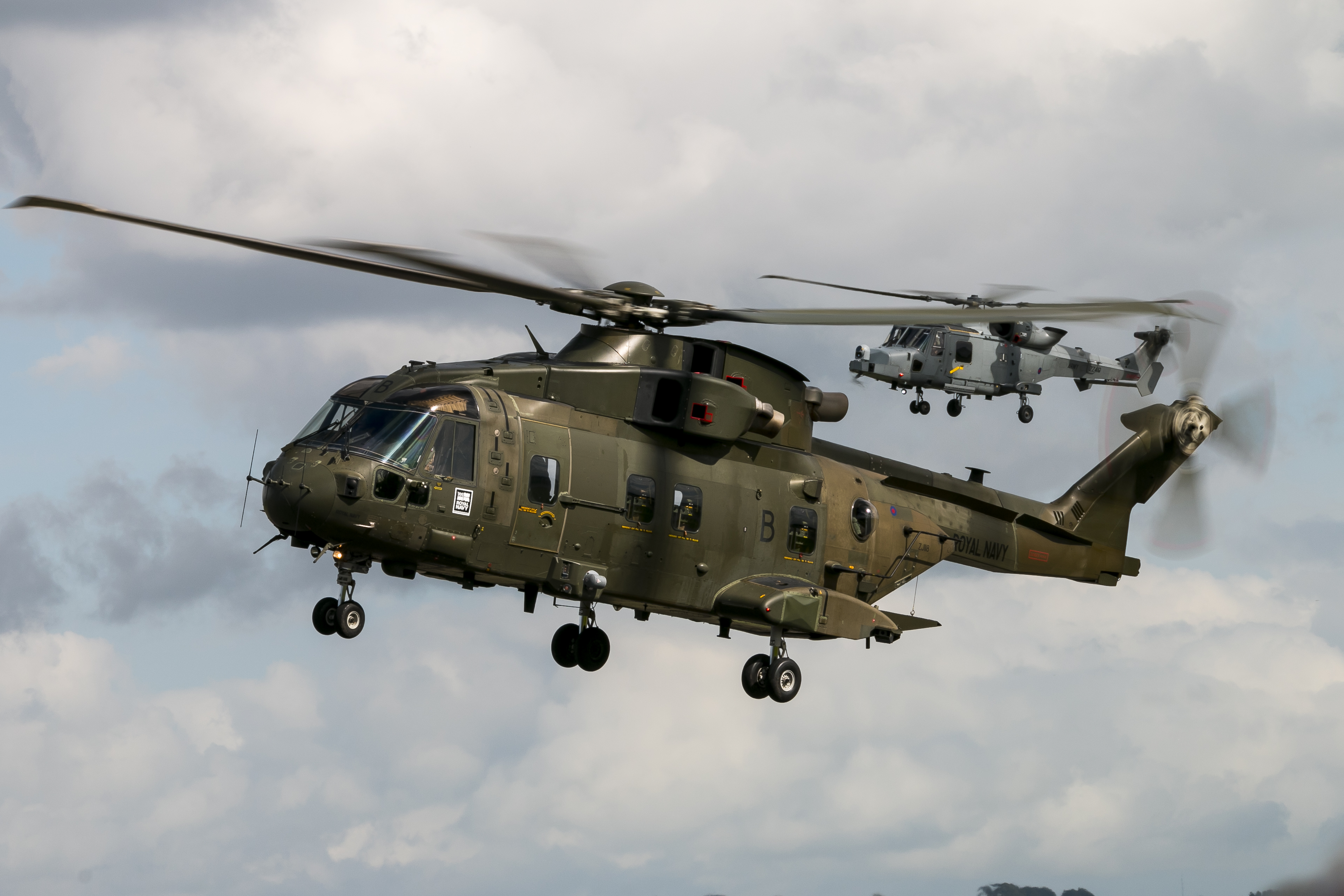
A Merlin HC3 and Wildcat AH1, both part of the Commando Helicopter Force, at RNAS Yeovilton

- HMNB Devonport (HMS Drake) – This is currently the largest operational naval base in Western Europe. Devonport's flotilla consists of most of the Type 23 frigates. In the past, Devonport was also home to some of the RN's submarine service.
- HMNB Portsmouth (HMS Nelson) – This is home to the Queen Elizabeth Class supercarriers. Portsmouth is also the home to the Type 45 Daring Class Destroyer and a moderate fleet of Type 23 frigates as well as Overseas Patrol Squadron.
- HMNB Clyde (HMS Neptune) – This is situated in Central Scotland along the River Clyde. Faslane is known as the home of the UK's nuclear deterrent, as it maintains the fleet of Vanguard-class ballistic missile (SSBN) submarines, as well as the fleet of Astute-class fleet (SSN) submarines. Faslane will become the home to all Royal Navy submarines, and thus the RN Submarine Service. As a result, 43 Commando (Fleet Protection Group) are stationed in Faslane alongside to guard the base as well as The Royal Naval Armaments Depot at Coulport. The newly established Mine and Threat Exploitation Group (MTXG) is also based within Faslane as a successor to the Sandown class mine hunters. Moreover, Faslane is also home to Faslane Patrol Boat Squadron (FPBS) who operates a fleet of Archer class patrol vessels.
- RNAS Yeovilton (HMS Heron) – Yeovilton is home to Commando Helicopter Force and Wildcat Maritime Force.
- RNAS Culdrose (HMS Seahawk) – This is home to Mk2 Merlins, primarily tasked with conducting Anti-Submarine Warfare (ASW) and Airborne Early Warning (AEW). Culdrose is also currently the largest helicopter base in Europe.
- HMS Gannet – Previously known as RNAS Prestwick. Previously used for Defence of the Clyde and Search and Rescue tasking, it is now used primarily as a FOB for ASW Merlins deployed from RNAS Culdrose to support the SSBN and defence of the Clyde tasking.

==== Bases abroad ====
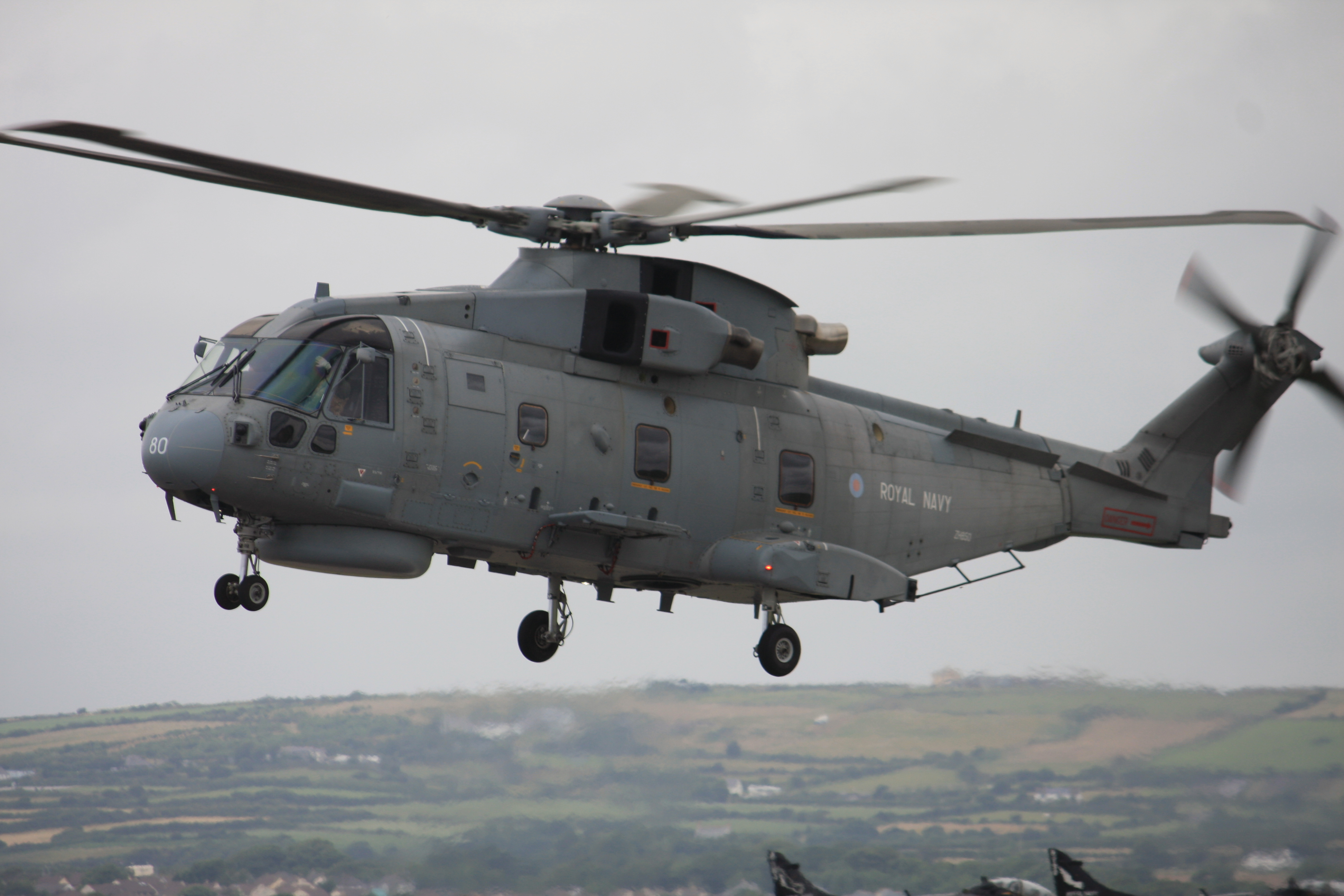
A Royal Navy Merlin HM2 at RNAS Culdrose

- UK National Support Element (Bahrain) – Previously the home port for vessels deployed on Operation Kipion and acts as the hub of the Royal Navy's operations in the Persian Gulf, Red Sea and Indian Ocean.
- UK Joint Logistics Support Base (Oman) – A logistical support facility which is strategically located in the Middle East but outside the Persian Gulf.
- British Defence Singapore Support Unit (Singapore) – A remnant of HMNB Singapore which repairs and resupplies Royal Navy ships in the Asia Pacific. It is the primary logistics support hub for the Royal Navy offshore patrol vessels assigned to the Asia-Pacific region, HMS Tamar and HMS Spey.
- HMNB Gibraltar – A current Royal Navy dockyard in Gibraltar which is still used for docking, repairs, training and resupply. Vessels permanently based with the Gibraltar Squadron include the Cutlass-class fast patrol boats, HMS Cutlass and HMS Dagger.
- Mare Harbour (Falkland Islands) – Serves as the port facility for RAF Mount Pleasant, the main British base in the Falkland Islands. Mare Harbour incorporates several berths which support Royal Navy and marine services vessels operating in the South Atlantic. The facility also supports the British Antarctic Survey ship, RRS Sir David Attenborough, when she operates in Antarctic waters during the regional summer.

== Titles and naming ==
=== Of the Navy ===
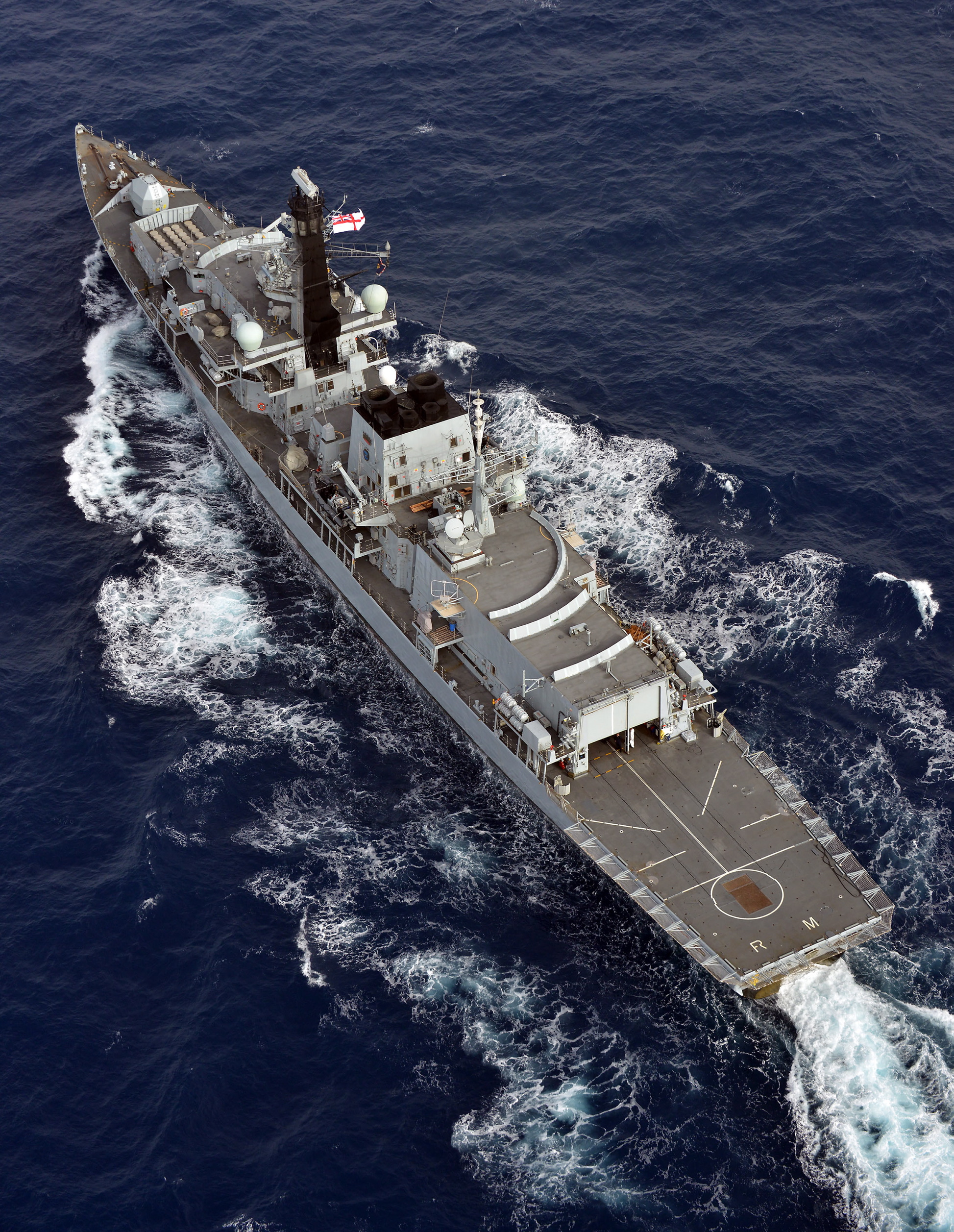
Type 23 frigates, also known as "Duke class", are named after British dukes.

The navy was referred to as the "Navy Royal" at the time of its founding in 1546, and this title remained in use into the Stuart period. During the interregnum, the commonwealth under Oliver Cromwell replaced many historical names and titles, with the fleet then referred to as the "Commonwealth Navy". The navy was renamed once again after the restoration in 1660 to the present title.

Today, the navy of the United Kingdom is commonly referred to as the "Royal Navy" both in the United Kingdom and other countries. Navies of other Commonwealth countries where the British monarch is also head of state include their national name, e.g. Royal Australian Navy. Some navies of other monarchies, such as the Koninklijke Marine (Royal Netherlands Navy) and Kungliga Flottan (Royal Swedish Navy), are also called "Royal Navy" in their own language. The Danish Navy uses the term "Royal" incorporated in its official name (Royal Danish Navy), but only "Flåden" (Navy) in everyday speech. The French Navy, despite France being a republic since 1870, is often nicknamed "La Royale" (literally: The Royal).

=== Of ships ===
Royal Navy ships in commission are prefixed since 1789 with His Majesty's Ship (or "Her Majesty's Ship", when the monarch is a queen), abbreviated to "HMS"; for example, HMS Beagle. Submarines are styled HM Submarine, also abbreviated "HMS". Names are allocated to ships and submarines by a naming committee within the MOD and given by class, with the names of ships within a class often being thematic (for example, the Type 23s are named after British dukes) or traditional (for example, the Invincible-class aircraft carriers all carry the names of famous historic ships). The monarch formally approves all ship names, with King George V vetoing naming a ship after Oliver Cromwell in 1911. Names are frequently re-used, offering a new ship the rich heritage, battle honours and traditions of her predecessors. Often, a particular vessel class will be named after the first ship of that type to be built. As well as a name, each ship and submarine of the Royal Navy and the Royal Fleet Auxiliary is given a pennant number which in part denotes its role. For example, the destroyer HMS Daring (D32) displays the pennant number 'D32'.

== Ranks, rates and insignia ==
The Royal Navy ranks, rates and insignia form part of the uniform of the Royal Navy. The Royal Navy uniform is the pattern on which many of the uniforms of the other national navies of the world are based (e.g. Ranks and insignia of NATO navies officers, Uniforms of the United States Navy, Uniforms of the Royal Canadian Navy, French Naval Uniforms).

Rank insignia of the commissioned officers of the Royal Navy
| Rank group | Officers of flag rank (Note: When in a command appointment, these officers are known as 'flag officers'. When not in a command appointment, they are known as 'officers of flag rank'.) | | | | Senior officers | | | | Junior officers | | | Officer cadets |
| NATO code | OF-10 | OF-9 | OF-8 | OF-7 | OF-6 | OF-5 | OF-4 | OF-3 | OF-2 | OF-1 | | N/A |
|---|---|---|---|---|---|---|---|---|---|---|---|---|
| Insignia | | | | | | | | | | | | |
| Rank | Admiral of the fleet (Note: Shown with the royal cypher of Charles III. The rank of admiral of the fleet has become an honorary/posthumous rank, war time rank; ceremonial rank; regular appointments ended in 1995.) | Admiral | Vice admiral | Rear admiral | Commodore | Captain | Commander | Lieutenant commander | Lieutenant | Sub-lieutenant | Midshipman | Officer cadet |
| Abbreviation | AdmF | Adm | VAdm | RAdm | Cdre | Capt | Cdr | Lt Cdr | Lt | Sub Lt / SLt | Mid | OC |

Rate insignia of the ratings of the Royal Navy
| Rate group | Warrant officers | | Senior ratings | | | Junior ratings | |
| NATO code | OR-9 | OR-8 | OR-7 | OR-6 | OR-5 | OR-4 | OR-2 |
|---|---|---|---|---|---|---|---|
| Shoulder insignia | | | | | | | |
| Arm insignia | | | | | | | No insignia |
| Rate | Warrant officer 1 | Warrant officer 2 | Chief petty officer | Petty officer | | Leading rating | Able rating |
| Abbreviation | WO1 | WO2 | CPO | PO | | LH | AB |

== Customs and traditions ==
=== Traditions ===
The Royal Navy has several formal customs and traditions including the use of ensigns and ships badges. Royal Navy ships have several ensigns used when under way and when in port. Commissioned ships and submarines wear the White Ensign at the stern whilst alongside during daylight hours and at the main-mast whilst under way. When alongside, the Union Jack is flown from the jackstaff at the bow, and can only be flown under way either to signal a court-martial is in progress or to indicate the presence of an admiral of the fleet on-board (including the Lord High Admiral or the monarch).

The Fleet Review is an irregular tradition of assembling the fleet before the monarch. The first review on record was held in 1400, and the most recent review as of 2022 was held on 28 June 2005 to mark the bi-centenary of the Battle of Trafalgar; 167 ships from many different nations attended with the Royal Navy supplying 67.

=== "Jackspeak" ===
There are several less formal traditions including service nicknames and Naval slang, known as "Jackspeak". The nicknames include "The Andrew" (of uncertain origin, possibly after a zealous press ganger) and "The Senior Service". British sailors are referred to as "Jack" (or "Jenny"), or more widely as "Matelots". Royal Marines are fondly known as "Bootnecks" or often just as "Royals". A compendium of Naval slang was brought together by Commander A.T.L. Covey-Crump and his name has in itself become the subject of Naval slang; Covey-Crump. A game traditionally played by the Navy is the four-player board game known as "Uckers". This is similar to Ludo and it is regarded as easy to learn, but difficult to play well.

== Navy cadets ==
The Royal Navy sponsors or supports three youth organisations:

- Volunteer Cadet Corps – consisting of Royal Naval Volunteer Cadet Corps and Royal Marines Volunteer Cadet Corps, the VCC was the first youth organisation officially supported or sponsored by the Admiralty in 1901.
- Combined Cadet Force – in schools, specifically the Royal Navy Section and the Royal Marines Section.
- Sea Cadets – supporting teenagers who are interested in naval matters, consisting of the Sea Cadets and the Royal Marines Cadets.

The above organisations are the responsibility of the CUY branch of Commander Core Training and Recruiting (COMCORE) who reports to Flag Officer Sea Training (FOST).

== In popular culture ==
The Royal Navy of the 18th century is depicted in many novels and several films dramatising the voyage and mutiny on the Bounty. The Royal Navy's Napoleonic campaigns of the early 19th century are also a popular subject of historical novels. Some of the best-known are Patrick O'Brian's Aubrey-Maturin series and C. S. Forester's Horatio Hornblower chronicles.

The Navy can also be seen in numerous films and television programmes. Television documentaries about the Royal Navy include: Empire of the Seas: How the Navy Forged the Modern World, a four-part documentary depicting Britain's rise as a naval superpower, up until the First World War; Sailor, about life on the aircraft carrier HMS Ark Royal; and Submarine, about the submarine captains' training course, 'The Perisher'. There have also been Channel 5 documentaries such as Royal Navy Submarine Mission, following a nuclear-powered fleet submarine.

== See also ==
- List of ship names of the Royal Navy (a full historical list)
- List of naval vessels of the United Kingdom
- List of Admiralty floating docks
- List of equipment in the Royal Navy
- Bibliography of 18th–19th century Royal Naval history
- List of Ig Nobel Prize winners
- List of wars involving the United Kingdom
- His Majesty's Coastguard
- Royal British Legion
- Royal Hospital School
- Royal Naval Association
- "Rule, Britannia!", song
- Allan Grimson, killer of sailors in the navy dubbed "The Royal Navy's Dennis Nilsen"

== Bibliography ==
- Chet, Guy (2014). The Ocean is a Wilderness: Atlantic Piracy and the Limits of State Authority, 1688–1856. University of Massachusetts Press. ISBN 978-1625340856.
- Clodfelter, Micheal (2017). Warfare and Armed Conflicts: A Statistical Encyclopedia of Casualty and Other Figures, 1492–2015. McFarland & Co Inc. ISBN 978-0786474707.
- Grimes, Shawn T. (2012). Strategy and War Planning in the British Navy, 1887–1918. Boydell. ISBN 978-1846158179.
- Harding, Richard (2005). The Royal Navy 1930–2000: Innovation and Defence. Frank Cass. ISBN 978-0203337684.
- Howard, David Armine (2003). British Sea Power: How Britain Became Sovereign of the Seas. Carroll & Graf. ISBN 978-0786712496.
- Hyde-Price, Adrian (2007). European Security in the Twenty-First Century: The Challenge of Multipolarity. London: Routledge. ISBN 978-1134164400.
- Kennedy, Paul (1989). The Rise and Fall of Great Powers. London: Fontana. ISBN 978-0049090194.
- Morris, Jan (1979). Farewell the Trumpets. Penguin Books. ISBN 978-0140049282.
- Nelson, Arthur (2001). The Tudor navy: the ships, men and organisation, 1485–1603. Conway Maritime Press. ISBN 978-0851777856.
- Potter, E. B. (1984). Sea Power: A Naval History. Naval Institute press. ISBN 978-0870216077.
- Rodger, Nicholas A. M. (1997). The Safeguard of the Sea: A Naval History of Britain, 660–1649. Vol. 1. HarperCollins. ISBN 978-0006388401.
- Rodger, Nicholas A. M. (2004). The Command of the Ocean: A Naval History of Britain, 1649–1815. Vol. 2. Penguin. ISBN 978-0141026909.
- Rodger, Nicholas A. M. (2024). The Price of Victory: A Naval History of Britain, 1814-1945. Vol. 3. Penguin Books. ISBN 978-0713994124.
- Rose, Lisle A. (2006). Power at Sea: The Breaking Storm, 1919–1945. Vol. 2. University of Missouri Press. ISBN 978-0826216946.
- Sondhaus, Lawrence (2001). Naval Warfare, 1815–1914. New York: Routledge. ISBN 978-0415214780.
- Stanton, Charles (2015). Medieval Maritime Wartime. Barnsley, South Yorkshire: Pen & Sword Maritime. pp. 225–226.
- Willmott, H. P. (2009). The Last Century of Sea Power: From Port Arthur to Chanak, 1894–1922. Vol. I. Indiana University Press. ISBN 978-0253352149.
- Willmott, H. P. (2010). The Last Century of Sea Power: From Washington to Tokyo, 1922–1945. Vol. 2. Indiana University Press. ISBN 978-0253353597.
- Wilson, Ben (2013). Empire of the Deep: the rise and fall of the British Navy. Weidenfeld & Nicolson. ISBN 978-0297864080.
- Winfield, Rif. British Warships in the Age of Sail 1603–1863: Design, Construction, Careers and Fates. Seaforth Publishing (in 4 volumes).
  (i) 1603-1714 (in 2009) ISBN 978-1-84832-040-6. (ii) 1714-1792 (in 2007) ISBN 978-1-84415-700-6. (iii) 1793-1817 (in 2008) ISBN 978-1-84415-717-6. (iv) 1817-1863 (in 2014) ISBN 978-1-84832-169-4.
