= Winterswiesbach =

River in Germany

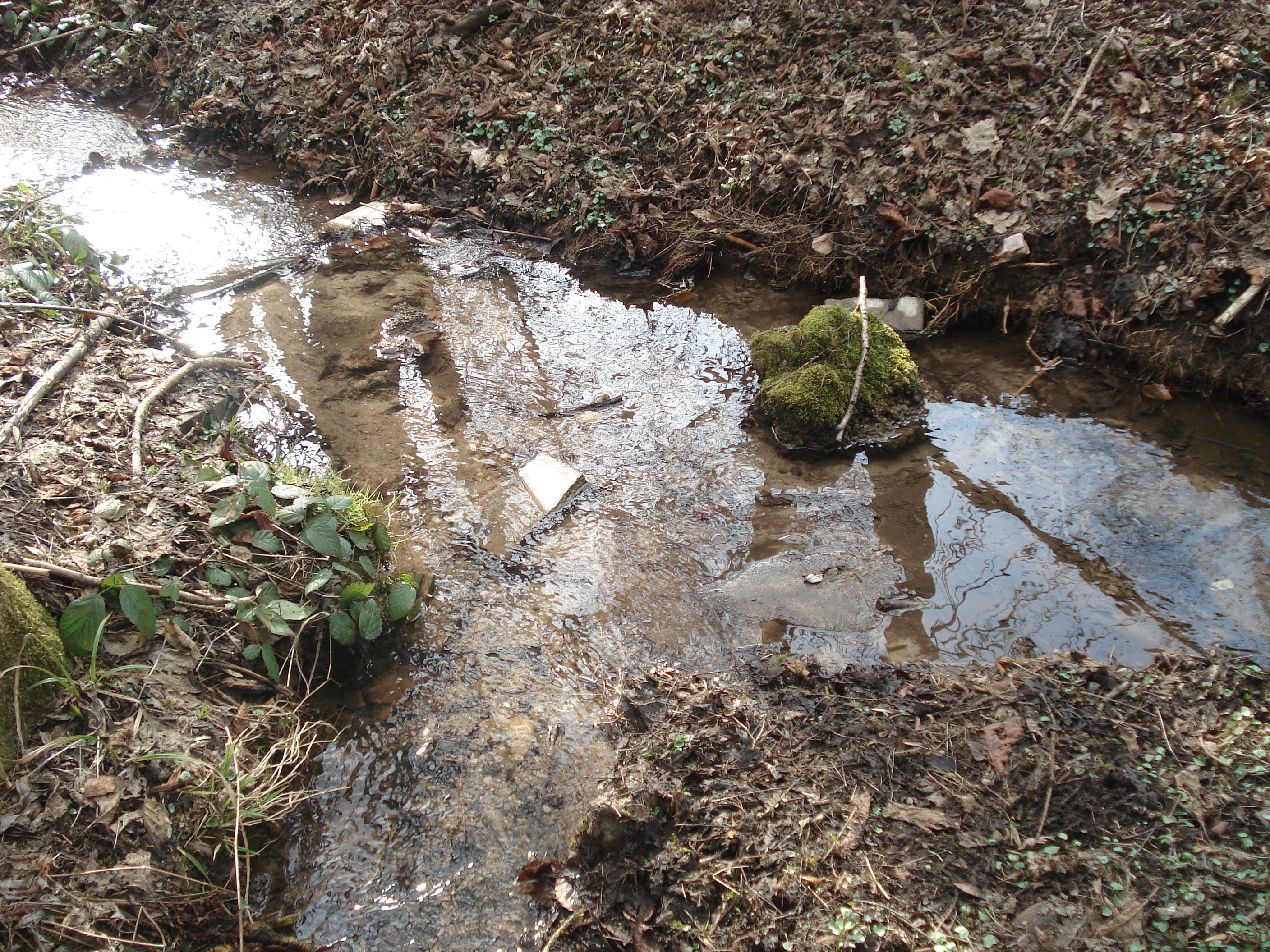
- Confluence of the Winterswiesbach (right) and Treppengraben (bottom) forming the Bruchbach (top left)

Location
- Country: Germany
- State: Bavaria

Physical characteristics
- Mouth
  - location: Bruchbach
  - coordinates: 50.0140°N 9.0726°E

Basin features
- Progression: Bruchbach→ Haggraben→ Forchbach→ Main→ Rhine→ North Sea

Winterswiesbach is a small river of Bavaria, Germany. It is a right tributary of the Bruchbach near Kleinostheim.

== See also ==
- List of rivers of Bavaria
