= Hochtief =

German construction company

Hochtief AG
- Type: Public subsidiary
- Traded as: FWB: HOT; DAX component
- ISIN: DE0006070006
- Industry: Construction
- Founded: 1873; 153 years ago
- Headquarters: Essen, Germany
- Products: Construction services, project management
- Revenue: ▲€27.756 billion (2023)
- Operating income: ▲€523 million (2023)
- Net income: ▼€314 million (2023)
- Total assets: ▲€19 billion (2023)
- Total equity: ▼€1.266 billion (end 2023)
- Number of employees: 41,575 (end 2023)
- Parent: ACS Group (75.71%)
- Website: hochtief.com

Hochtief AG is a global provider of infrastructure technology and construction services, with locations in North America, Australia, and Europe. The Essen based company is primarily active in the fields of high tech, energy transition, and sustainable infrastructure. With the international projects making up 95% of the company's revenue, Hochtief was among the largest international construction firms in 2023.

In Australia, the group is active through its subsidiary Cimic (100% since 2022). Via its wholly owned subsidiary Turner, Hochtief is a leader in commercial construction in the United States. Since June 2018, Hochtief has held a 20% stake in Abertis. Abertis directly owns 99.1% of the toll road operator Abertis Infraestructuras.

Since ACS Group first acquired shares in Hochtief in 2005, it has increased its shareholding to 75.71% in 2023.

== History ==
=== Founding and early years ===
In 1873, brothers Philipp Helfmann (a bricklayer) and Balthasar Helfmann (a locksmith), originally from Kelsterbach, founded the company Gebrüder Helfmann in Frankfurt am Main. While Balthasar was responsible for the completion of construction contracts, Philipp developed the financing side of the business. Their first major contract was for the University of Giessen in 1878. By the 1880s, the company had begun to produce its own construction materials but was still only a regional player. Shortly after the death of Balthasar, Philipp Helfmann transformed the company into a joint-stock corporation for building construction and civil engineering named Aktiengesellschaft für Hoch- und Tiefbauten (Construction and Civil Engineering Corporation) in 1896, just before the German Stock Exchange Act came into force.

A major development was the contract for the spa in Bad Orb in 1899, where the order included not just construction of the buildings, but also provision of infrastructure like roads and gardens, arrangement of finances for the project, and maintenance of some responsibilities for operation after the construction. Also in 1899, another turnkey project, a new grain silo in Genoa, Italy, was both the firm's first international venture and its first project using reinforced concrete. Philipp Helfmann died in the same year, with his son-in-law, Hans Weidmann, taking over as Chief Executive.

=== After the Helfmann brothers ===
Shaft XII at Zollverein colliery was named Schacht "Albert Vögler". The Bauhaus-influenced design combined function with aesthetics.

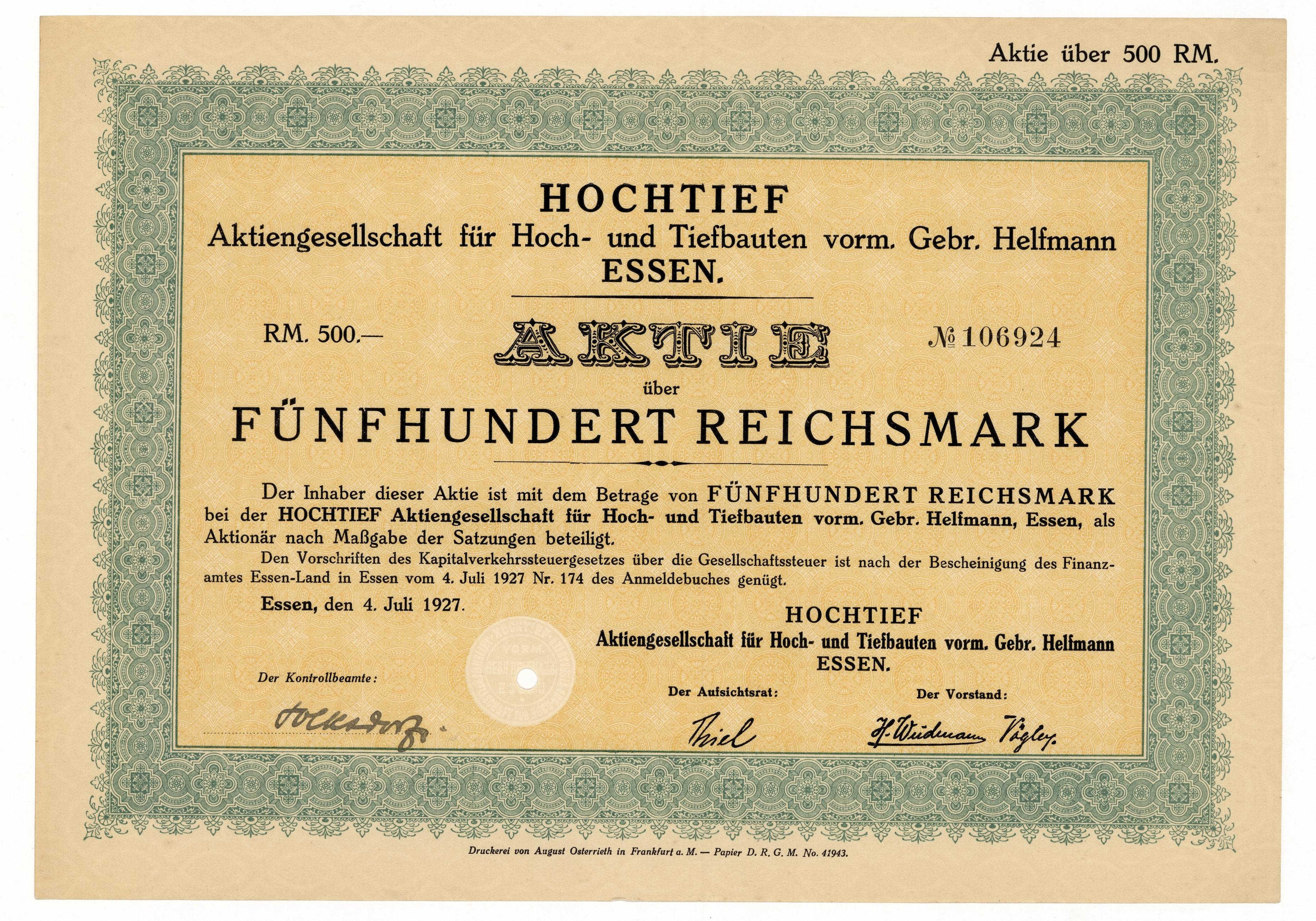
Share of the Hochtief AG, issued 4. July 1927

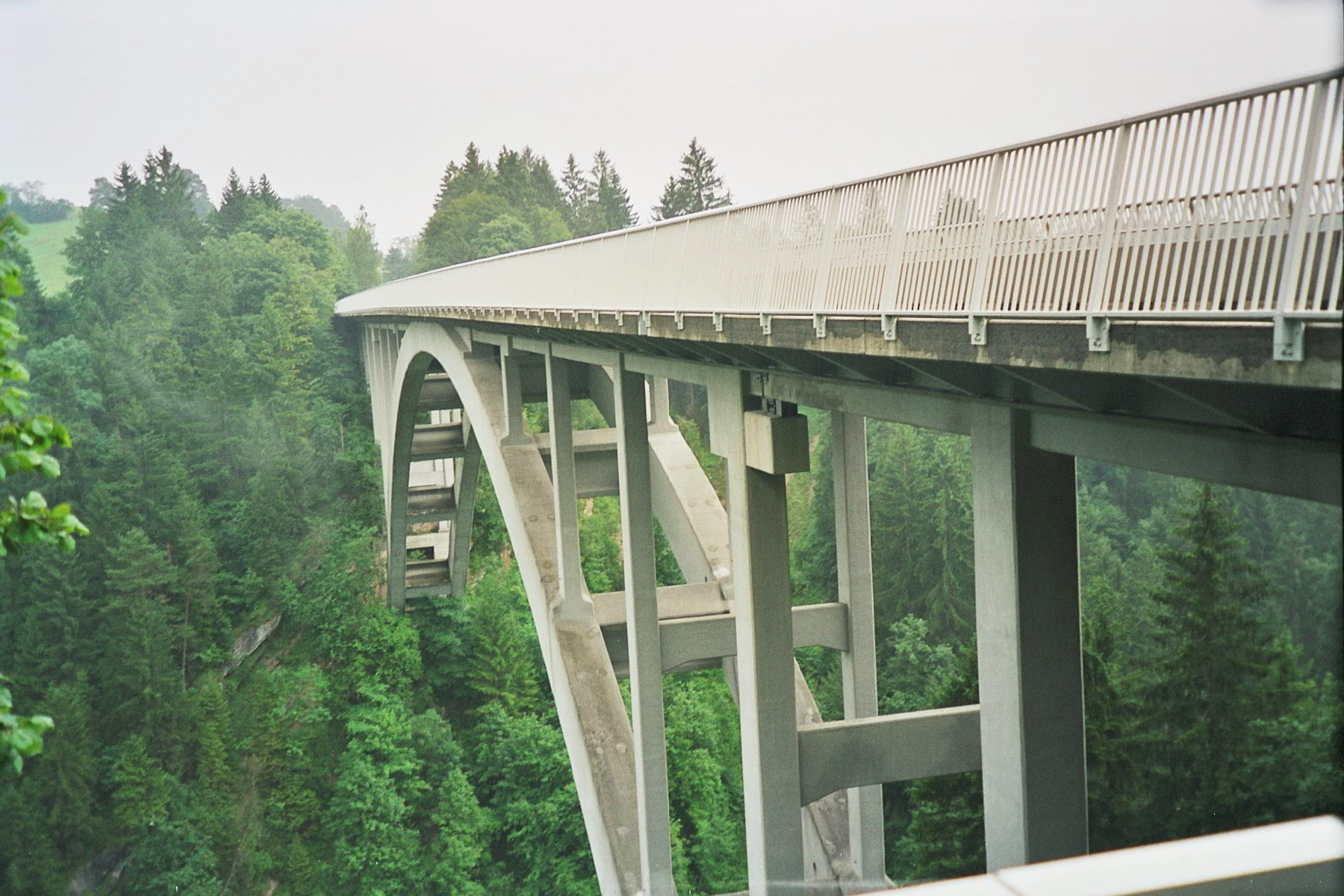
Echelsbach Bridge, completed 1929

The firm grew rapidly, but was not comparable with the major German construction companies of the era. In 1921, it attracted investment from the industrialist Hugo Stinnes (described by Time as the "New Emperor of Germany" for his wealth and influence) and in 1922, the firm moved its base to Essen as part of its integration into the Stinnes group. Stinnes planned to use Hochtief for all his construction projects, while Hochtief saw an opportunity to profit from the Treaty of Versailles, organising the delivery of construction materials to France as part of German reparations for World War I. Stinnes died in 1924, and within a year his industrial empire collapsed. With the help of several banks, the company (now known as Hochtief Aktiengesellschaft für Hoch- und Tiefbauten vorm. Gebrüder Helfmann) avoided insolvency. In the aftermath of the Stinnes collapse, the major utility RWE and electrical equipment producer AEG became major shareholders in Hochtief, and Hans Weidmann stepped down in 1927.

A series of major construction projects ensued, including the Echelsbach Bridge (then Germany's largest single span reinforced concrete bridge), the Schluchsee dam and work on the Zollverein colliery.

=== From Nazi Germany to Reconstruction ===
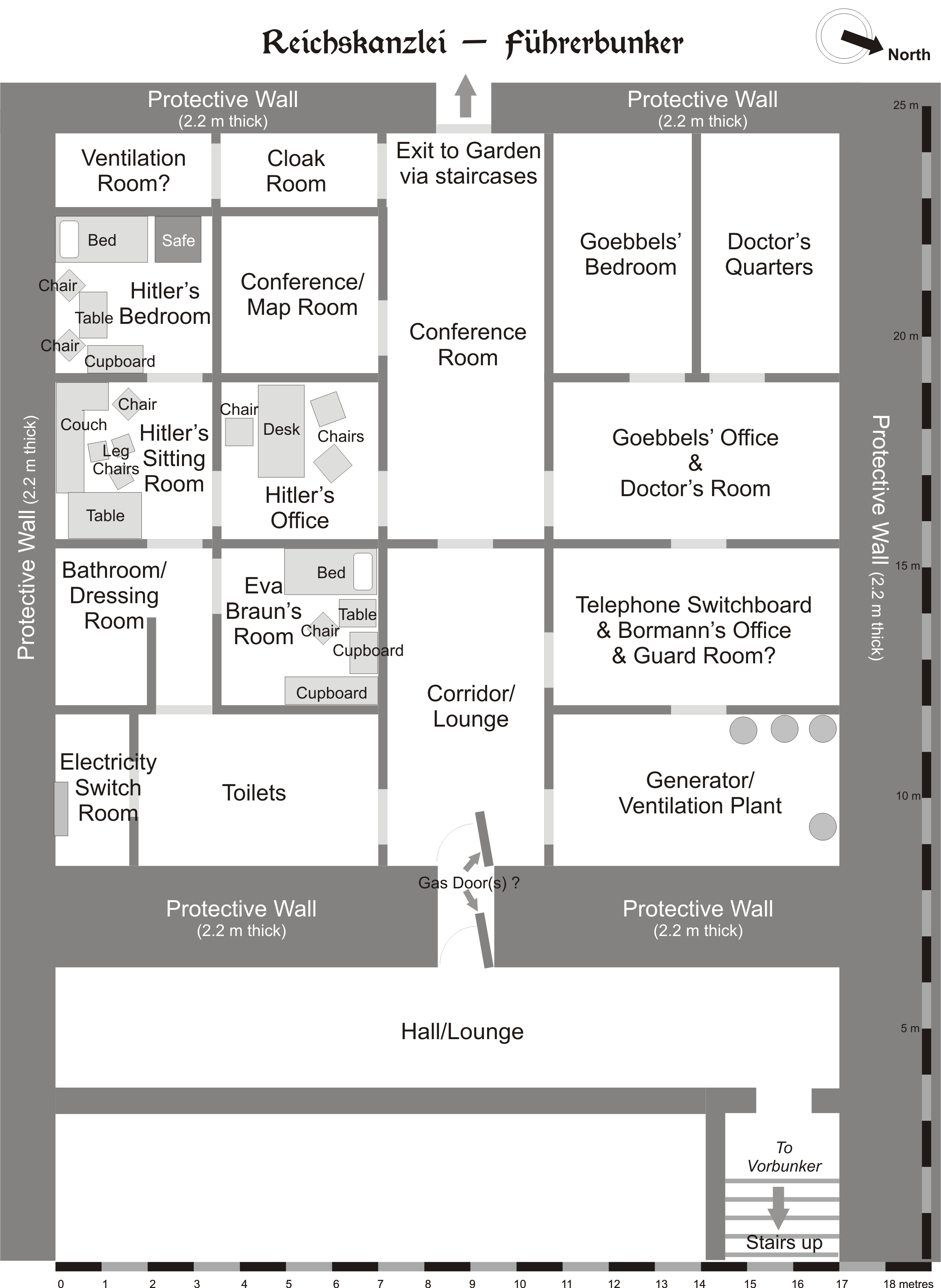
A reconstruction of the layout of the Führerbunker in Berlin, built by Hochtief in 1943. Hitler committed suicide here during the Battle of Berlin in 1945.

From 1933 onwards, the structures of the Third Reich influenced Hochtief's business activities. Jewish members of the supervisory board were expelled under the Nuremberg Laws in 1935. In 1937, CEO Eugen Vögler joined the Nazi Party (NSDAP) and served as leader of the Construction Industry Group as well as an honorary squad leader of the Hitler Youth. The construction business flourished under the four year plan, with its vast public works programme, including the Autobahn network, and the industrial build-up in preparation for war, for example the construction of a new truck factory for Opel in Brandenberg. Hochtief also worked on a new centre for Nazi rallies in Nuremberg. In 1936, it moved its Essen headquarters from the Pferdemarkt to its current location on Rellinghauser Straße. As war became imminent, the company began work on the Westwall defensive network. During World War II, it worked on the Atlantic Wall defences, and a range of infrastructure projects across German-dominated Europe. Hochtief also constructed buildings for Hitler himself, notably his Bavarian Alpine retreat, the Berghof, his Wolf's Lair headquarters in Rastenburg, and the Führerbunker in Berlin, where Hitler ultimately committed suicide.

After 1939, the firm began to use forced labour extensively on its projects, as did many other German industrial companies at the time. Hochtief's slave workers suffered from malnutrition, beating and constant abuse.

=== Reconstruction and international expansion ===
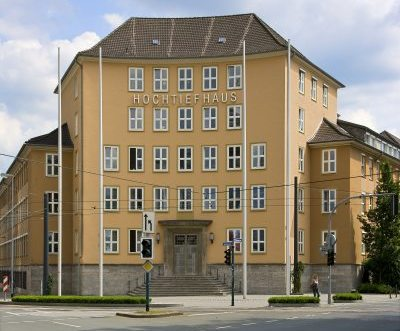
Historic entrance to the former company headquarters

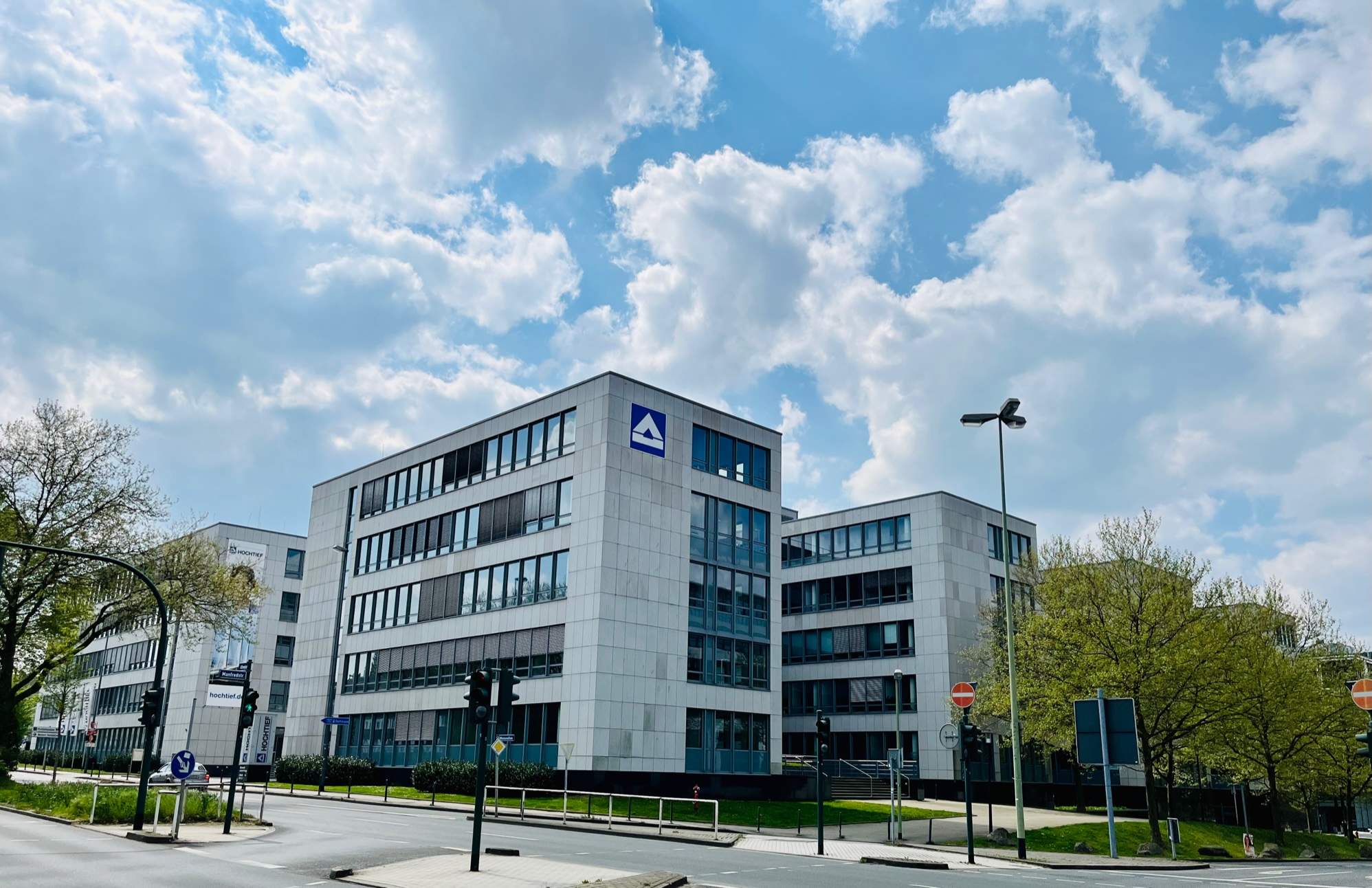
Headquarters of the Group in Essen

==== 1945–1966 ====
After the collapse in 1945, Hochtief lost both its international business and its branches in East Germany. Under the leadership of the new CEO, Artur Konrad, operations continued.

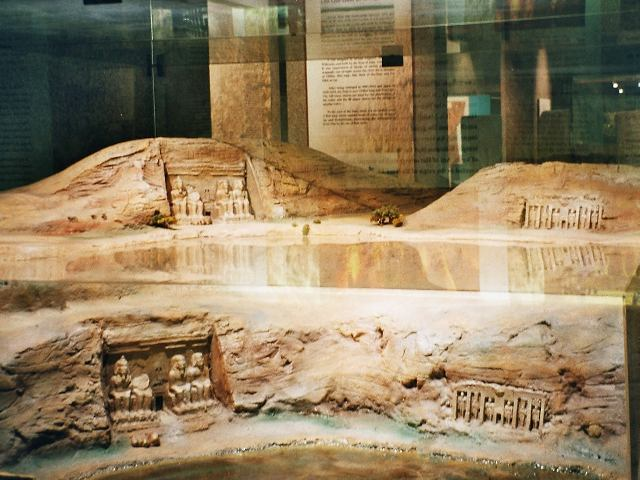
The old and new positions of the Abu Simbel temples

One of the first major contracts was for a university hospital in Bonn, between 1946 and 1949. The introduction of the Deutsche Mark in 1948 and the beginning of the Wirtschaftswunder brought more new work.

Josef Müller took over as CEO in 1950. A decision was made to undertake more international projects, following a period of essentially domestic work after World War II. This included a series of power infrastructure works in Turkey and bridge and smelting works construction in Egypt during the early 1950s. Many projects from this period were undertaken outside of the First World, often funded from development aid budgets.

The company gained international recognition for the relocation of the Abu Simbel rock temple (from November 1963 to September 1968, planned by Walter Jurecka, former head of the international division) and the Mandulis Temple of Kalabsha (1961 to 1963). These UNESCO World Heritage sites had to be relocated due to the construction of the Aswan High Dam.

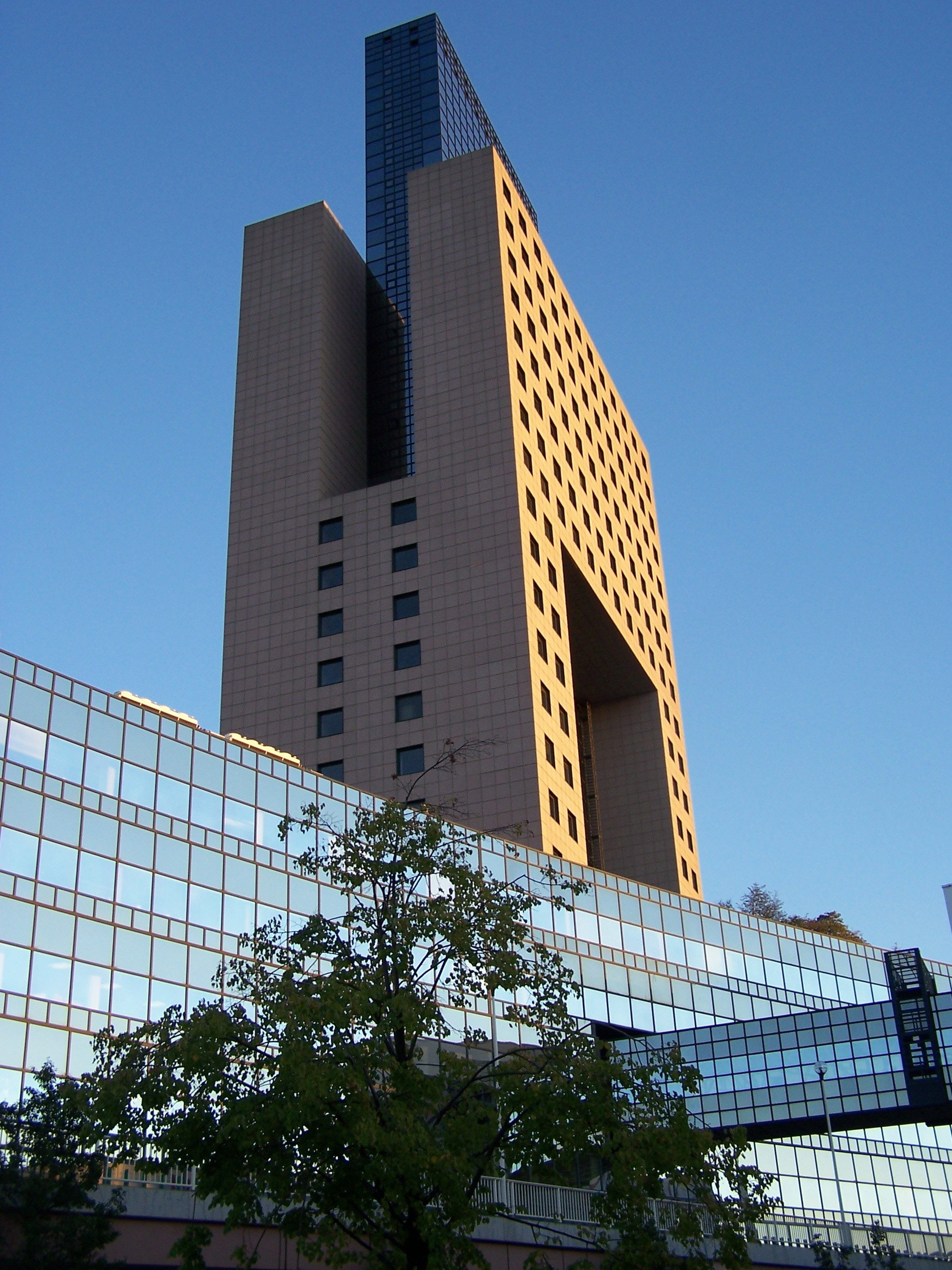
The radical Messe Torhaus in Frankfurt, with its "Guillotine"

==== 1967–1989 ====
From 1967 onwards, the company's focus shifted away from purely construction services towards turnkey construction and related services, exemplified by the Hilton Hotel in Athens.

By the mid-1970s, the international business accounted for only a small portion of the company's activities. Most work was domestic, driven by Germany's strong economic growth, with a particular strength in power plant construction. This included the construction of the Federal Republic of Germany's first nuclear power plant, Kahl Nuclear Power Plant, near Dettingen am Main. The construction contract had been awarded by AEG, which had been commissioned by the utility company RWE to build the plant. The plant began to feed its electricity to the grid in June 1961. By contrast, the first East German nuclear plant, at Rheinsberg, was connected to the grid in 1966. During the 1960s and 1970s, the company also executed significant transport infrastructure projects. Notable examples include the Raúl Uranga Subfluvial Tunnel in Argentina, the Elbe Tunnel in Hamburg, and the Bosphorus Bridge in Istanbul.

After the 1973 oil crisis, the company benefited from the unexpected wealth of oil-exporting countries. By 1980, foreign work accounted for more than 50% of Hochtief's business. A major factor was the contract for the turnkey construction of King Abdulaziz International Airport (completed in 1981), the largest airport in Saudi Arabia, located in Jeddah, and the most valuable contract Hochtief had ever been involved with. The aesthetics of the architecture of the airport is highly rated, and it has several unusual features, including Terminal Three, used only during the Hajj, reserved for pilgrims travelling to Mecca. It has a tent-shaped fibreglass roof, contains a mosque, can accommodate 80,000 travellers at once, and is believed to be the largest terminal in the world.

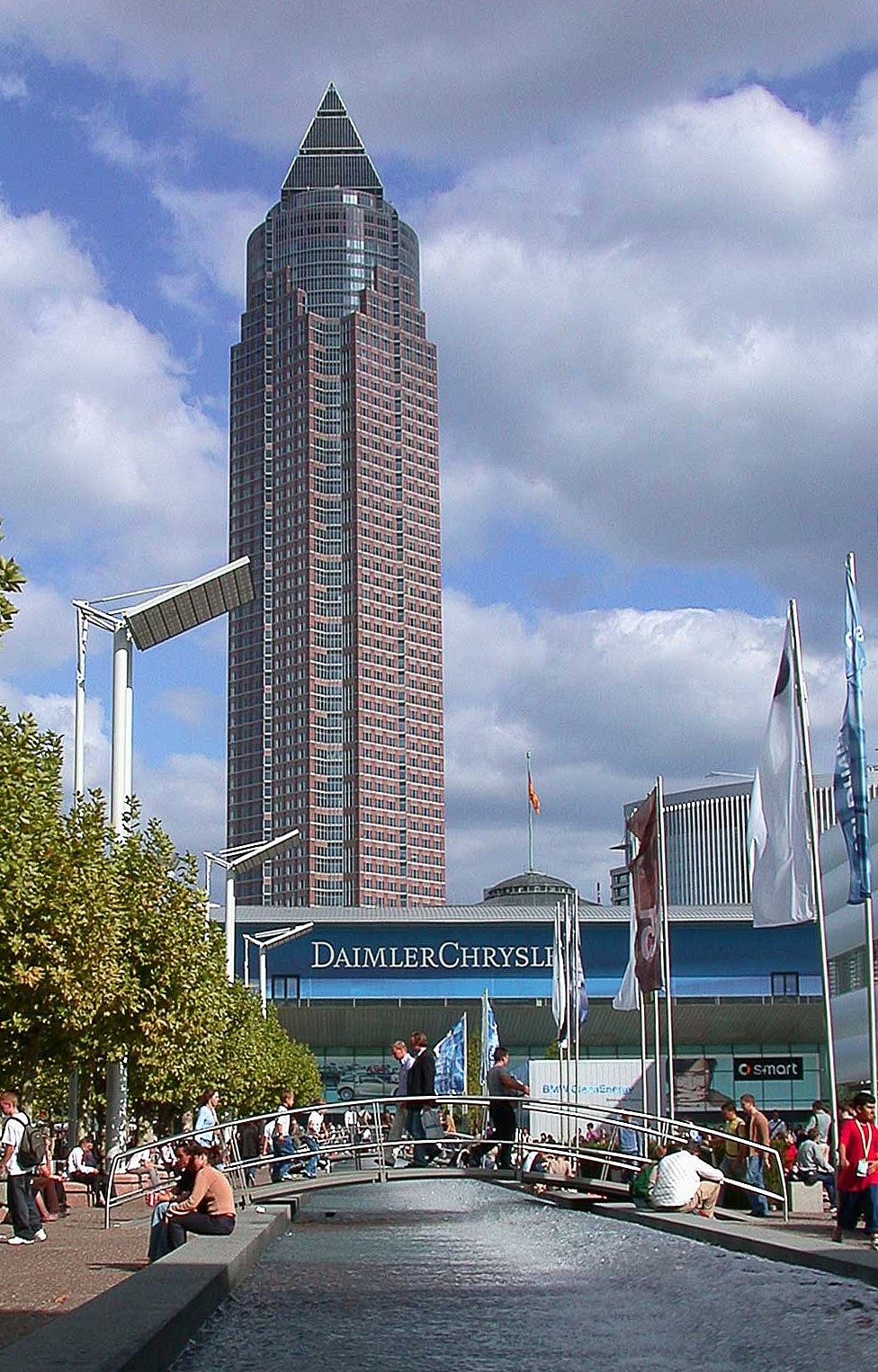
When the Messeturm in Frankfurt was completed in 1991, it was Europe's tallest building.

==== 1990–2007 ====
After German reunification, the company benefited from the construction boom, although by 1993, slowing economic growth led to increased competitive pressure. Under the leadership of Hans-Peter Keitel initially, and from 2007 Herbert Lütkestratkötter, the company underwent a restructuring. While construction remained the core business, Hochtief also began offering additional services as a construction provider, including the planning, financing, and operation of buildings. Acquisitions were made to support these new business areas. To further this, Hochtief founded new companies and acquired Australia's Leighton Holdings and the US-based Turner Construction.

In 2004, Hochtief transitioned from a subsidiary to a publicly traded company: the sale of the majority shareholder RWE's shares gave Hochtief a new international shareholder structure. By 2005, around 80% of the company was in free float. Through the acquisition of service companies Siemens Gebäudemanagement and Lufthansa Gebäudemanagement, Hochtief Facility Management, a subsidiary, expanded from 800 to approximately 4,500 employees in 2004. In 2007, Hochtief acquired Flatiron, a provider of infrastructure projects in the United States. Hochtief is also represented in the Gulf region through the Habtoor Leighton Group, a Leighton subsidiary.

=== Loss of independence ===
In 2005, August von Finck, through his Custodia Holding, acquired a stake in the company, which was increased to 25.08% in 2006. In March 2007, the Spanish construction group Actividades de Construcción y Servicios (ACS) purchased Custodia's shares for €72 per share, with the transaction amounting to over €1.26 billion. Subsequently, ACS acquired more shares, holding 29.9% by September 2010. On 16 September 2010, ACS announced a public takeover bid for the remaining shares, offering an exchange of eight ACS shares for five Hochtief shares. On 29 November, BaFin approved ACS's takeover of Hochtief. In December, Qatar Holding from the Emirate of Qatar subscribed to a reserved capital increase, acquiring nearly 9.1% of the shares. After improving the offer to nine ACS shares for five Hochtief shares, ACS announced in January 2011 that it held over 30% of Hochtief's shares following the conclusion of the takeover bid. By June 2011, ACS held slightly over 50% of Hochtief's shares, as shares held by Hochtief itself were voting shares attributed to ACS.

=== Restructuring and reorganisation ===
In May 2013, Hochtief sold its airports division to Canada's Public Sector Pension Investment Board for €1.1 billion. At the same time, Hochtief began restructuring its loss-making European activities in 2013: The Group spun off the construction business, which had previously been bundled into one unit, into four largely autonomous companies and cut up to 1,000 jobs, primarily in Germany.

In February 2014, the 50% stake in the real estate company Aurelis Real Estate, a former subsidiary of Deutsche Bahn, was sold to an investor consortium led by the private equity firm Grove. Further sales of smaller business units followed. In May 2015, Hochtief's offshore business was sold to GeoSea, a subsidiary of the DEME Group. However, Hochtief strengthened its activities in the Asia-Pacific region, increasing its stake in the listed Australian subsidiary Leighton Holdings Limited from approximately 58% to 69.62% in 2014.

As part of the reorganisation, the company was renamed from Leighton Holdings to Cimic Group in April 2015.

=== Developments from the 2020s onwards ===
In 2022, Juan Santamaría Cases assumed his position as CEO of the company, succeeding Marcelino Fernández Verdes. In 2023, Hochtief, together with EWE, was awarded funding under the German government's Deutschlandnetz initiative to establish and operate charging points for electric vehicles.

== Corporate affairs ==
=== Finances ===
In the 2023 financial year, Hochtief generated revenue of €33.3 billion, with the majority of earnings coming from Hochtief Americas. During the same financial year, 56,875 employees worked for the group.

Year	Revenue in million €	Net income in million €	Total assets in million €	Employees
2015	21,097	208	13,270	44,264
2016	19,908	321	14,077	51,490
2017	22,631	421	13,349	53,890
2018	23,882	212	14,448	55,777
2019	25,852	206	17,902	53,282
2020	22,954	395	16,508	46,644
2021	21,378	212	16,508	36,858
2022	26,219	482	18,619	36,858
2023	27,756	523	19,330	41,575
2024	33,301	776	24,972	56,875
2025	38,236	902	24,943	61,519

=== Shareholder structure ===
Hochtief stock price (Frankfurt) since 1973

Hochtief is an Aktiengesellschaft. Its shares are traded on all German stock exchanges, including the Frankfurt Stock Exchange and Börse München, using the Xetra system.

Shareholders as of September 2024:

- Grupo ACS – 75.71%
- Floating share – 21.07%
- Treasury shares – 3.21%

=== Company structure ===
The Hochtief Group operates three divisions with subsidiaries and additionally holds a 20% stake in Abertis HoldCo, S.A.:

Hochtief
Turner Construction	Cimic Group	Engineering and Construction	Abertis

Turner is an American construction management company. It is primarily involved in the delivery of healthcare and education facilities, airports, sports venues, and office buildings. Additionally, Turner is increasingly active in the construction of technical facilities, such as factories for electric vehicles and battery recycling, as well as data centres, including those for the internet company Meta.

Cimic operates in the Asia-Pacific region, providing construction services for sectors such as education, healthcare, power and energy, transportation, tunnelling, and water. Cimic is also active in natural resources, holding stakes in service providers Thiess and Sedgman.

Engineering and Construction encompasses Hochtief's construction activities and PPP business in Europe, along with the civil engineering company Flatiron in North America. In Europe, Hochtief operates in Germany, Poland, the Czech Republic, Austria, the UK, Scandinavia, and the Netherlands.

Hochtief holds a stake in Abertis, a toll road operator with approximately 8,000 kilometres of toll roads in Europe and South America. Abertis operates mainly in France, Spain, Brazil, Chile, the United States, Mexico, and Puerto Rico.

Subsidiaries include Flatiron, CPB Contractors, Leighton Asia (active in Hong Kong and other Southeast Asian countries), and Hochtief Infrastructure.

== Products and services ==
The company is mainly active in construction and civil engineering (buildings, bridges, tunnels, etc.). In addition to executing construction projects, Hochtief is also involved in planning and, in some cases, acts as a co-investor. Furthermore, Hochtief is active in the construction and operation of environmental technology facilities, as well as the expansion of digital infrastructure.

The corporate group also provides services such as organising and consulting on real estate and infrastructure facilities.

=== Urban and social infrastructure ===
Hochtief develops and constructs neighbourhoods and districts that include residential properties, as well as public and commercial facilities.

=== Energy infrastructure and digital infrastructure ===
Hochtief delivers construction and infrastructure services for energy systems, from generation to utilization, and supports digital infrastructure projects like data centers and telecom networks.

Hochtief is active in the energy infrastructure sector through subsidiaries such as Flatiron in the US and Canada, CPB Contractors in Australia, Leighton Asia in Hong Kong and Southeast Asia, as well as Hochtief Infrastructure in Germany.

=== Transport infrastructure ===
In the field of transport infrastructure, the company constructs bridges, railways, stations, airports, and ports, as well as roads, tunnels, and motorways both domestically and internationally, often within the framework of concession models such as public-private partnerships.

Hochtief holds a 20% stake in the internationally operating toll road operator Abertis, which owns approximately 8,000 kilometres of toll roads across several countries.

=== Mining operations ===
Hochtief is involved in the mining business through Cimic and holds a stake in Thiess, a contract miner. In October 2020, Cimic sold 50% of its stake in its mining subsidiary Thiess to the Elliott Fund Management; in April 2024, Cimic increased its shareholding back to 60%.

== Timeline of notable construction projects ==
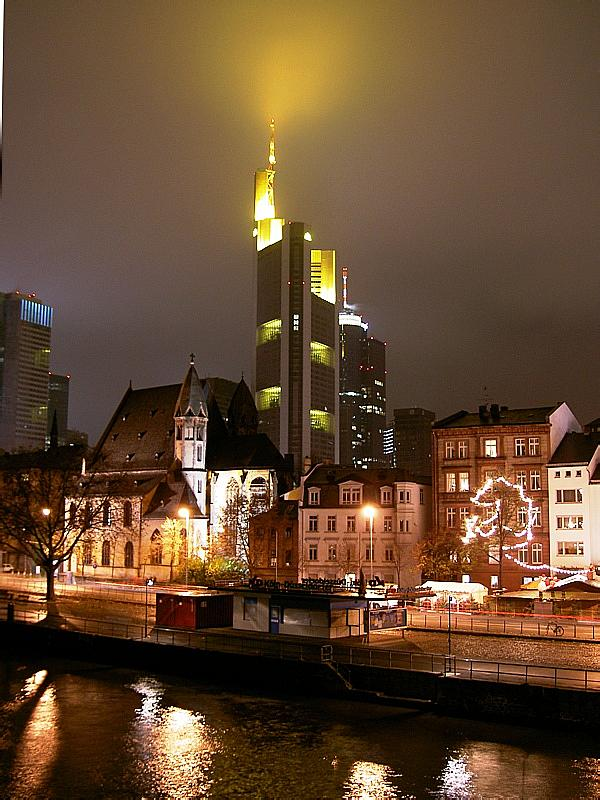
The Commerzbank Tower surpassed the Messeturm

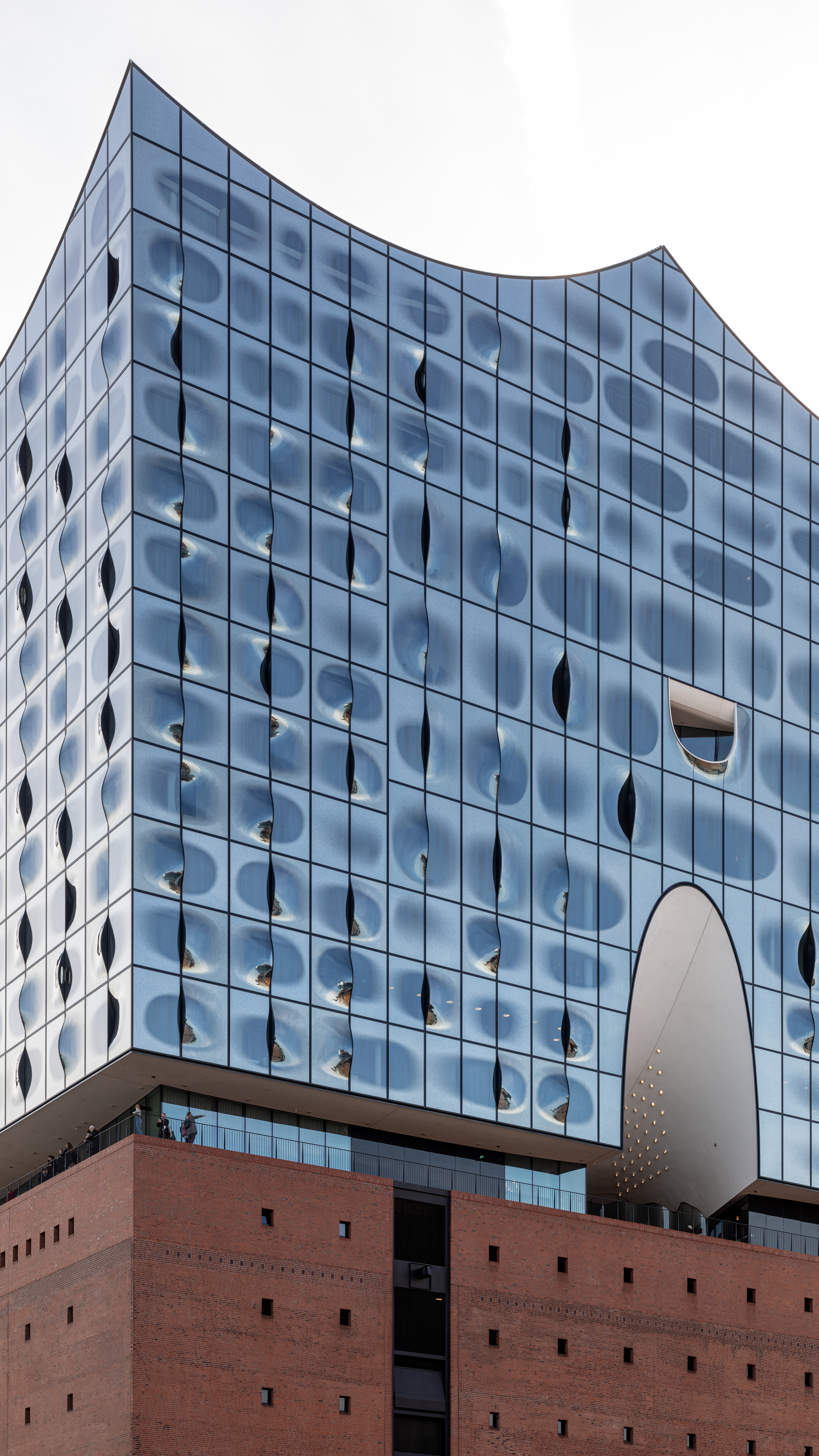
Elbphilharmonie

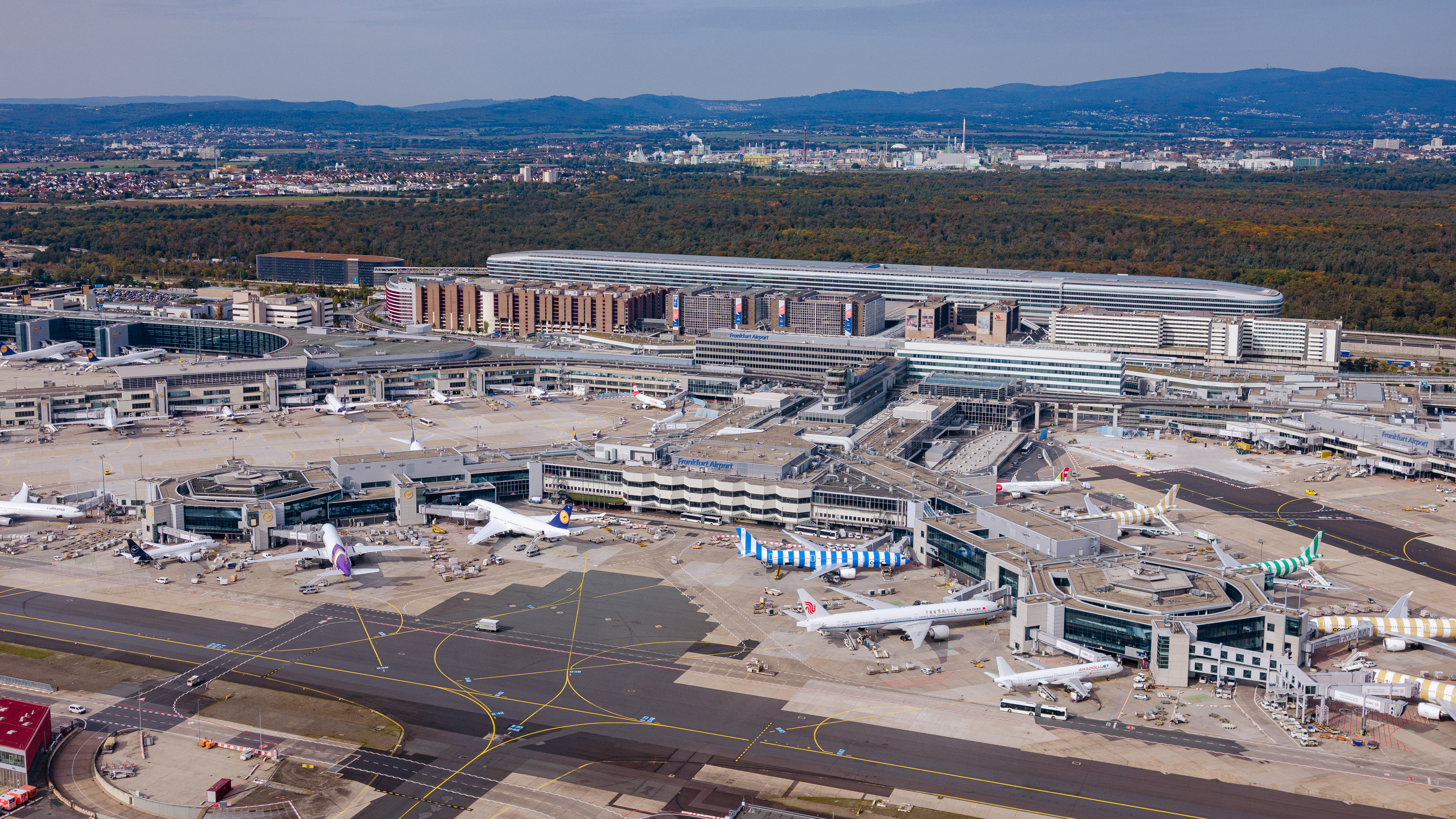
Frankfurt Airport

Projects Hochtief has been involved in include the Elbphilharmonie in Hamburg, the Gotthard Base Tunnel in Switzerland and the project planning of the Burj Khalifa in Dubai. Hochtief has also worked on various airports, such as those in Frankfurt, Athens, and Warsaw, as well as several expansions of the German motorways. International bridge construction projects include the Øresund Bridge and the Bosphorus Bridge.

- 1878–1879: University of Giessen, Giessen
- 1927–1932: Zollverein colliery (Shaft XII), Essen
- 1927–1928: Predigtstuhl Cable Car, Bad Reichenhall
- 1928–1929: Echelsbach Bridge, near Echelsbach, Bavaria
- 1929–1931: Schluchsee Dam, Schluchsee, Black Forest
- 1930–1934: Albert Canal, Belgium
- 1938–1945: Projects included the Westwall and Atlantic Wall defenses, and Hitler's Berghof, Wolf's Lair and Führerbunker
- 1946–1949: Bonn University Hospital, Bonn
- 1952–1956: Sariyar Dam, Ankara, Turkey
- 1954–1964: Vianden Pumped Storage Plant, Vianden, Luxembourg
- 1958–1961: Kahl Nuclear Power Plant, Dettingen am Main
- 1960–1969: Hernandarias Subfluvial Tunnel, Argentina
- 1961–1963: Hilton Hotel, Athens, Greece
- 1963–1968: Abu Simbel temples transplanted, Egypt
- 1968–1972: Frankfurt Airport, Frankfurt
- 1969–1975: New Elbe Tunnel, Hamburg
- 1970–1974: Bosphorus Bridge, Turkey
- 1974–1981: King Abdulaziz International Airport, Jeddah, Saudi Arabia
- 1981–1984: Mosul Dam, Iraq
- 1984–1985: Messe Torhaus, Frankfurt am Main
- 1988–1991: Messeturm, Frankfurt am Main
- 1990–1992: Terminal One, Warsaw Airport, Poland
- 1994–1996: Commerzbank Tower, Frankfurt am Main
- 1996–2000: Athens International Airport, Greece
- 1996–2000: Øresund Bridge, Copenhagen and Malmö, Sweden
- 1998–2000: Kandinsky-Klee house restoration, Dessau
- 2001–2016: Gotthard Base Tunnel, Erstfeld, Switzerland
- 2002–2004: Katima Mulilo Bridge, Zambia and Namibia
- 2004–2008: Opera Krakowska, Kraków, Poland
- 2005–2008: Dnipro Stadium, Ukraine
- 2007–2016: Elbphilharmonie, Hamburg
- 2009–2011: Lake Champlain Bridge, Crown Point, New York and Chimney Point, Vermont
- 2009–2012: Berlin Ostkreuz station, Berlin
- 2011–2017: Queensferry Crossing, Edinburgh, Scotland
- 2014–2019: Expansion of King Khalid International Airport, Riyadh, Saudi Arabia
- 2016–2020: SoFi Stadium, Los Angeles, California
- 2017–2020: Remodelling od the State Opera, Prague, Czech Republic
- Start 2019: The Spiral, New York City
- Start 2019: Sydney Metro: Pitt Street Station, Sydney, Australia

The company is also working on the Chacao Channel bridge due to be completed in 2025.

== Sustainability ==
In 2022, Hochtief published its Sustainability Plan 2025, aiming for the company's operations to become climate-neutral by 2045. Additionally, the company is listed in the Dow Jones Sustainability Index by S&P Global.

== Bibliography ==
- Pohl, Manfred; Siekmann, Birgit (2000). Hochtief und seine Geschichte: von den Brüdern Helfmann bis ins 21. Jahrhundert. München Zürich: Piper. ISBN 978-3-492-04270-3.
