= Haro Senft =

German film director

- Born: September 27, 1928; Czechoslovakia
- Died: February 4, 2016 (aged 87); Munich, Bavaria, Germany
- Occupation: Filmmaker

Haro Senft (27 September 1928, Budweis, Czechoslovakia (now České Budějovice, Czech Republic – 4 February 2016, Munich) was a German filmmaker who was one of the founders of the New German Cinema movement. His short documentary film Kahl about the Kahl Nuclear Power Plant received an Academy Award for Documentary Short Subject nomination in 1961. In 2013, he received the Berlinale Camera award at the Berlin International Film Festival.

== Selected filmography ==
- Kahl (1961, short documentary)
- The Smooth Career (1967)
- Purgatory (1971)
- Ein Tag mit dem Wind (1978)
- Jacob hinter der blauen Tür (1987)
- Lebewohl, Fremde (1991)
