= Großwelzheim Nuclear Power Plant =

Nuclear power plant in Germany

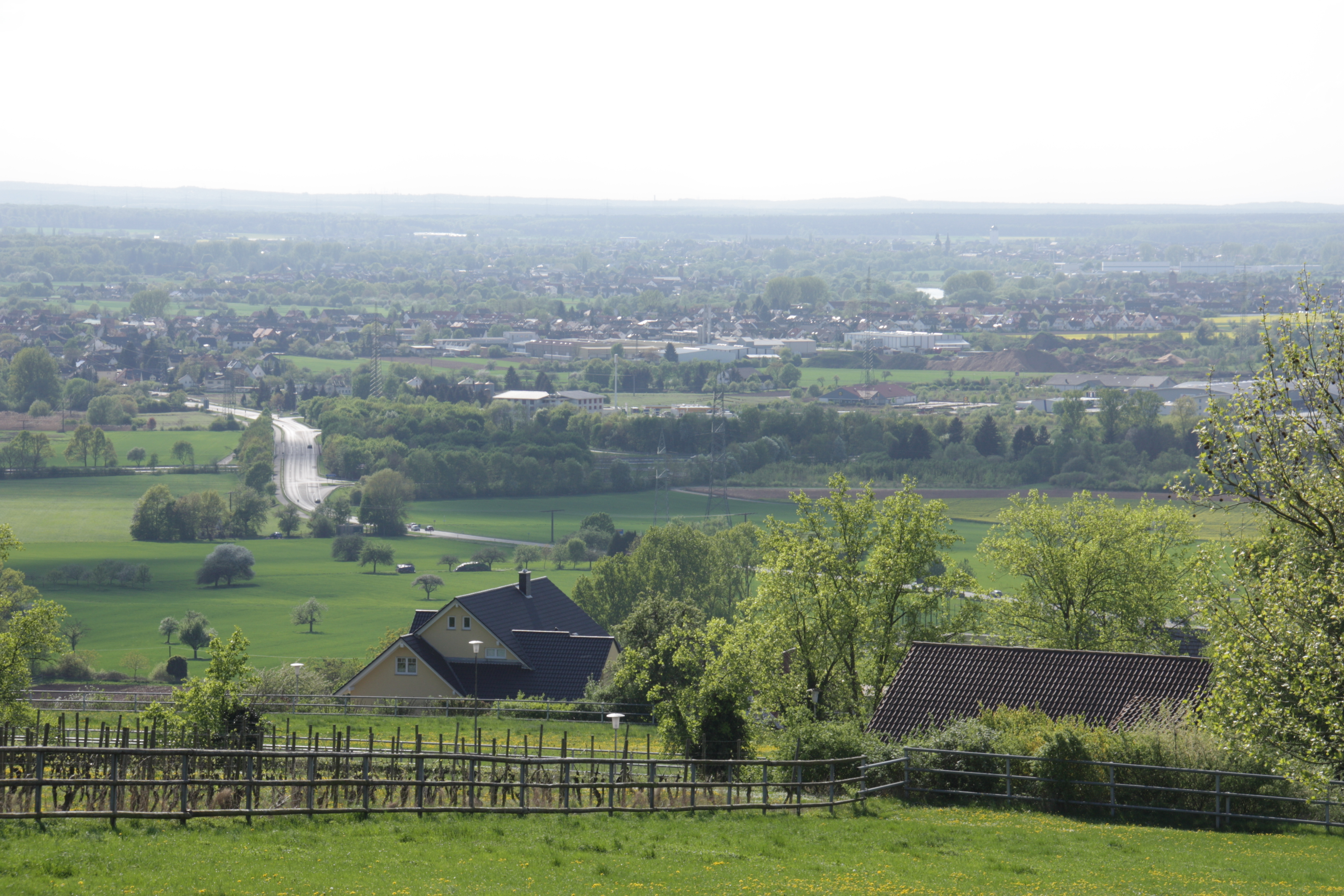
- Karlstein am Main, Location of the plant
- Country: Germany
- Location: Karlstein am Main, Bavaria
- Coordinates: 50°3′29″N 8°59′13″E
- Status: Decommissioned
- Construction began: 1 January 1965
- Commission date: 17 July 1961
- Decommission date: 20 April 1971
- Owner: Heißdampfreaktor-Betriebsgesellschaft mbH

Nuclear power station
- Reactor type: Boiling water reactor
- Thermal capacity: 100 MW_{t}

Power generation
- Units decommissioned: 1 x 25 MW_{e}
- Annual net output: 6.2 GWh (in 1971)

Großwelzheim Nuclear Power Plant, (German: Kernkraftwerk Großwelzheim, HDR), was an experimental nuclear power plant consisting of one 25 MW reactor in Großwelzheim, a district of Karlstein am Main.

== History ==
The prototype boiling water reactor, designed to produce superheated steam, was under construction from 1965 to 1969. It was first connected to the power grid on 14 October 1969. The reactor could not be run at full capacity due to structural defects in the fuel elements. Because of this, the reactor was switched off about a year and a half later, on 20 April 1971.

After the decommissioning in 1983, the plant was used for reactor safety tests until dismantling was completed in 1998.

The site also included the Kahl Nuclear Power Plant, the first nuclear reactor to be built in Germany, as well as the first to be shut down. This makes the site the first in Germany where two reactors have been dismantled.

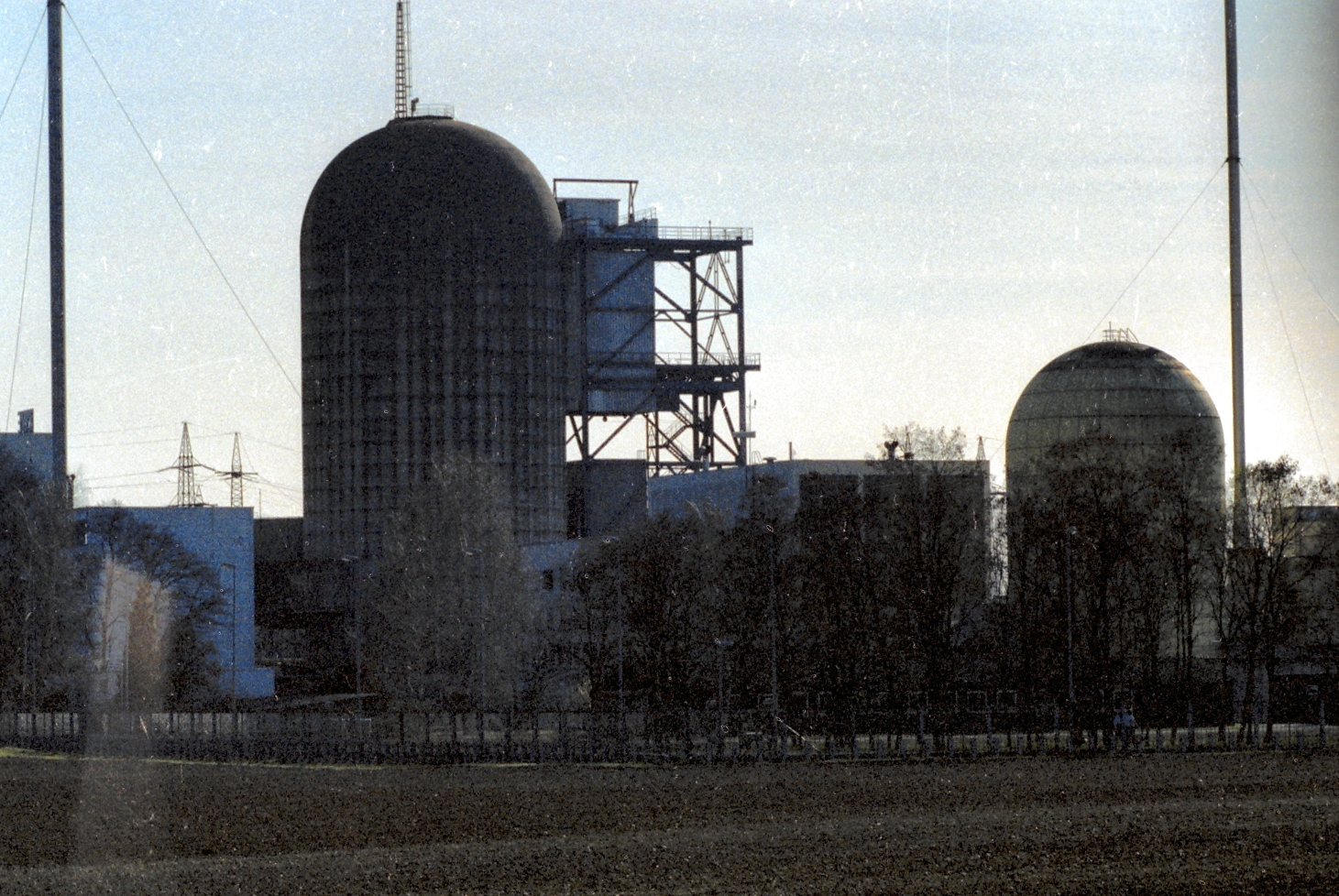
The Kahl Nuclear Power Plant in 1989

When the community of Karlstein am Main was created in 1975, an atomic symbol was included in the municipal coat of arms, due to the two reactors present in the newly formed town.

Karlstein am Main coat of arms featuring an atomic symbol.

== Reactors ==
Großwelzheim Nuclear Power Plant had one Reactor:

Reactor	Reactor Type	Net Capacity	Gross Capacity	Construction Start	First Grid Connection	Commercial Operation Start	Permanent Shutdown Date
HDR Großwelzheim	Prototype Boiling Water Reactor	23 MW	25 MW	1 January 1965	14 October 1969	2 August 1970	20 April 1971
