= Bruchbach =

Bruchbach may refer to various rivers and streams in Germany:

- Bruchbach (Hessel), a tributary of the Hessel in Gütersloh district, North Rhine-Westphalia
- Bruchbach (Haggraben), a tributary of the Haggraben in Aschaffenburg district, Bavaria
- another name for the Ahler Bruchgraben, a tributary of the Else in Lower Saxony and North Rhine-Westphalia
- a name for the upper reaches of the Rotbach (Erft), a tributary of the Erft in North Rhine-Westphalia
