= Haggraben =

River in Germany

- The Haggraben before the inflow of the Rückersbach at Kleinostheim

Location
- Country: Germany
- States: Bavaria

Physical characteristics
- Mouth
  - location: Forchbach
  - coordinates: 50.0395°N 9.0378°E

Basin features
- Progression: Forchbach→ Main→ Rhine→ North Sea

Haggraben is a small river of Bavaria, Germany. It flows into the Forchbach in Karlstein am Main.

== See also ==
- List of rivers of Bavaria
