= Kahl (film) =

1961 film

- Directed by: Haro Senft
- Narrated by: Nils Clausnitzer
- Cinematography: Heinz Furchner
- Music by: Hans Posegga
- Production company: Dido Film
- Release date: 1961
- Running time: 12 minutes
- Country: West Germany
- Language: German

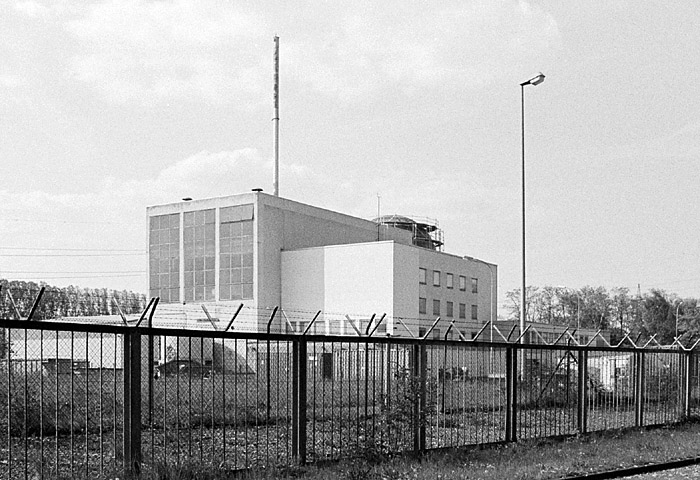
Kahl experimental nuclear power plant, shortly before the demolition of the reactor dome

Kahl is a 1961 West German short documentary film about the Kahl Nuclear Power Plant. It was nominated for an Academy Award for Best Documentary Short.
