= Hajj Terminal =

Airport terminal in Jeddah, Saudi Arabia

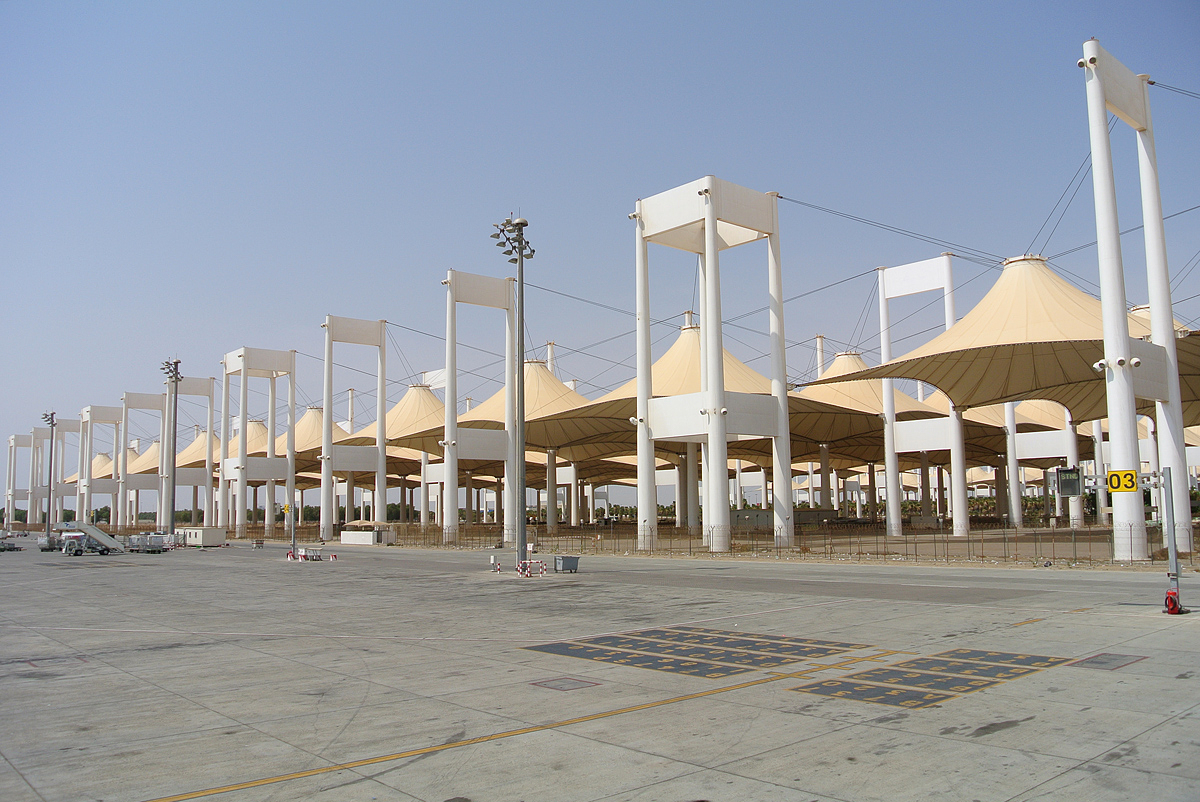

General information
- Architectural style: Modern architecture
- Coordinates: 21.699°N 39.139°E
- Construction started: 1979
- Construction stopped: 1982
- Inaugurated: 31 May 1981
- Renovated: 2009
- Cost: US $80 million
- Owner: General Authority of Civil Aviation

Technical details
- Material: Pylons - Steel; Tent - Teflon and beta fiberglass yarn
- Size: 105 acres

Design and construction
- Architecture firm: Skidmore, Owings & Merrill

Website
- www.kaia.sa

The Hajj Terminal is a passenger terminal dedicated to the annual Haji pilgrimage at King Abdulaziz International Airport, the principal airport serving Jeddah and Mecca, Saudi Arabia. It is located behind the two North and South Terminals, and four kilometres northwest from the newer Terminal 1 complex. Construction began in 1979, and was completed within a three-year timeframe in 1982.

== History ==
=== Planning ===
Since 1967, Jeddah International Airport was sought for replacement as it had grown into its remaining, urban-constricted space. By the late 1970s, it was forced to handle 600 daily aircraft movements and 50,000 passengers per day. As a result, a significantly larger airport began development north from Jeddah in 1974. The new airport—called King Abdulaziz International Airport's—was intended to have a north and south terminal. Both were air conditioned and comprised two terminals, having ten 150-passenger mobile lounges manufactured from West Germany linking commuters to the apron. Originally, the North Terminal, also known as Terminal 2, was to be used as the Hajj terminal. It was later considered too small amidst construction, and further north a 42 hectare site was selected for the improvisation of a large new terminal. This would end up becoming the terminal servicing every Haji season.

"Therefore one of the first decisions was to not make a huge totally air-conditioned environment. We felt that from a local and cultural viewpoint, the main terminal space should be an open, shaded space. What were the possibilities, then? We could create roof structures in concrete, or some such material. We could developed a series of umbrellas that could be simply scattered all over the large site."

— Fazlur R. Khan (1982)

International architecture and engineering firm Skidmore, Owings & Merrill won the contract for designing the terminal in 1975. Instead of constructing a standard, enclosed building for the airport which would not reflect the kingdom's culture, the architects based it off traditional Bedouin tents. Additionally, a single building enclosing both processing and waiting zones was considered too impractical to build. As Muslims making the pilgrimage would spend most of their time under the sun, the main terminal space would rather act as an open, shaded space. 20 metre square umbrellas were too expensive to build or regularly replace, and the firm settled on a permanent ‘high-tech’ structure. A translucent material developed by Owens-Corning produced a thin fibre sheet for the roof. At the time, a terminal permanently incorporating tents was unheard of. Previously, the use of fabrics in developments were used in the sports stadiums, shopping malls, and exhibition halls, for example the U.S. Pavilion at Expo '70 in Japan.

=== Construction ===
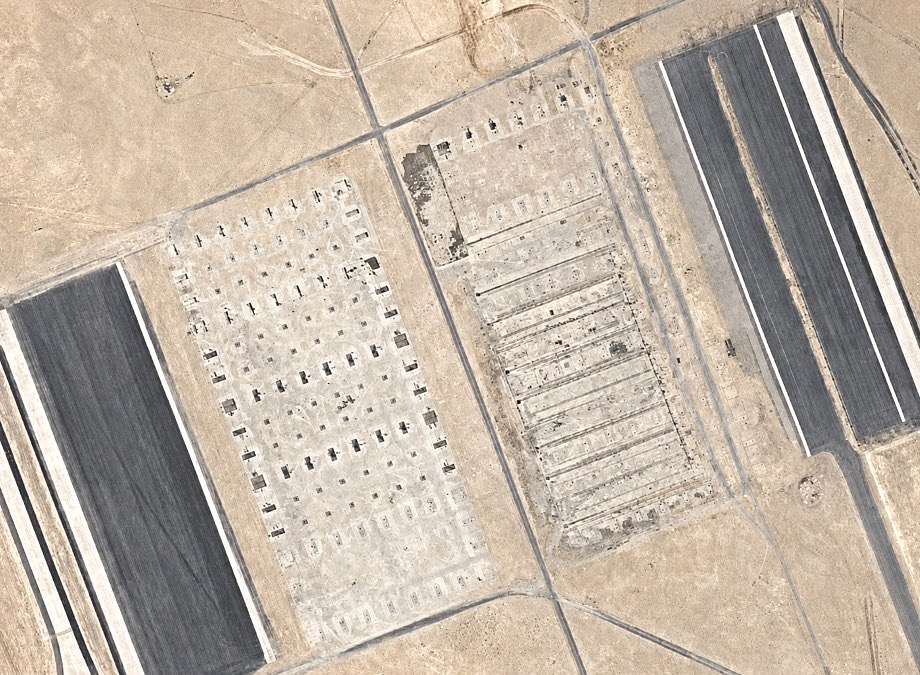
Aerial imagery depicting the early construction phase of the Hajj Terminal on 12 July 1979.

West German engineering firm, Hochtief was entrusted as the general contractor for the project. Owens Corning became the primary manufacturer for the tent’s fibreglass fabric, utilising its plants based in Rhode Island. Each of the components for the terminal had to be perfect during manufacturing, as contractors were unable to return to the plants for replacement. To further prevent any errors, Owens Corning carried a $2.5-million testing program at its technical centre in Granville, Ohio using a sized down prototype. Additionally, a training program specific to the terminal's construction was established for the workforce. The fabric material comprised Beta fiberglass yarn, reputed to be six times finer than silk yet having high durability. It was additionally coated in Teflon to reflect sunlight, and treated in chemicals to last longer once exposed to harsh Red Sea winds. 510,967 square meters of Teflon-covered fibreglass fabric was manufactured and used. Additionally, 440 steel support pylons were installed made from 30,000 tons of rolled steel manufactured from Tsu, Japan. They were then transported to Jeddah by barge. To hoist the fabrics to form its tent-like structure, 246 miles worth of steel cable was imported from Beaujolais, France.

In May 1979, the construction of the first pylons began using a 280-ton crane in a three-staged installation method. During positioning, 80-ton steel support pylons were placed on concrete pads and secured with bolts. Afterwards, over 30 steel radial cables were attached to the top of the pylons and a 16-foot, two-foot section metal ring was suspended 33 meters from the ground between four pylons. In the last stage, the bottom half of the metal ring was lowered by a pulley to the ground over a 2,415 square meter fabric unit for attachment. When it was raised into the air, the fabric would drape from it. Workers would pull the bottom of the fabric outwards and secured the edges to the pylon's steel cables, forming a square frame at the bottom. Afterwards, the 32 radial steel cables are threaded directly into the fabric's sleeves to stretch it from the top centre to lower outer edges. This was how the fabric was shaped and strengthened similarly to the spine of an umbrella. When all 21 units were completed, they were hoisted to their full height and bolted both sections of the support ring together bounding the fabric. By October 1981, a total of 210 tent-like units were installed to form a single continuous structure.

=== Opening and operations ===
Upon completion, it was originally planned that the terminal would be ready for the 1980 pilgrimage, with full operation slated for 1982. On 21 April 1981, King Khalid and Prince Fahd inaugurated King Abdulaziz International Airport after seven years of construction. It was prematurely opened to passenger services on 31 May, and the Hajj Terminal received the first Hajj season in September–October 1981. Construction was completed in 1982.

"I believe that the powerful roof form is evocative of Saudi Arabia. Perhaps if you look at more traditional Saudi architecture would you equate it with mashrabiya (wood screens), mud-brick houses or nomadic tents? Perhaps a little of each, but the tent is the key. The tent does not copy tent of the past — it is a form for the future and here it is caters for today’s needs — air travel."

— Fazlur R. Khan (1982)

Outside of each season, the Hajj Terminal was ideally suited for hosting large public events. The first time the terminal was used for a non-aviation purpose was in June 1982 for Jeddah‘s reception of the coronation of King Fahd.

=== Modernisation ===
Through the 1980s and 1990s, the size of the terminal successfully accommodated the growing number of pilgrims. By 2005 however, the intended capacity was finally reached and stressed its facilities, resulting in poor processing service and long waiting times. In December 2006, the concession for Phase 1 of modernising the Hajj Terminal was signed. A consortium led by the Saudi Binladin Group in association with Aéroports de Paris Management won the BTO concession for the terminal, investing US $249 million. This led to the construction of an apron on the western side, resurfacing of runway 16R/34L, and the refitting of jet bridges on the eastern side. The Islamic Development Bank provided up to US $100 million in financing, with the International Finance Corporation acting as the transaction advisor for the General Authority of Civil Aviation. The construction was completed in September 2010, and the refurbished terminal served 8.3 million passengers in 2012 and 8.8 million by 2015.

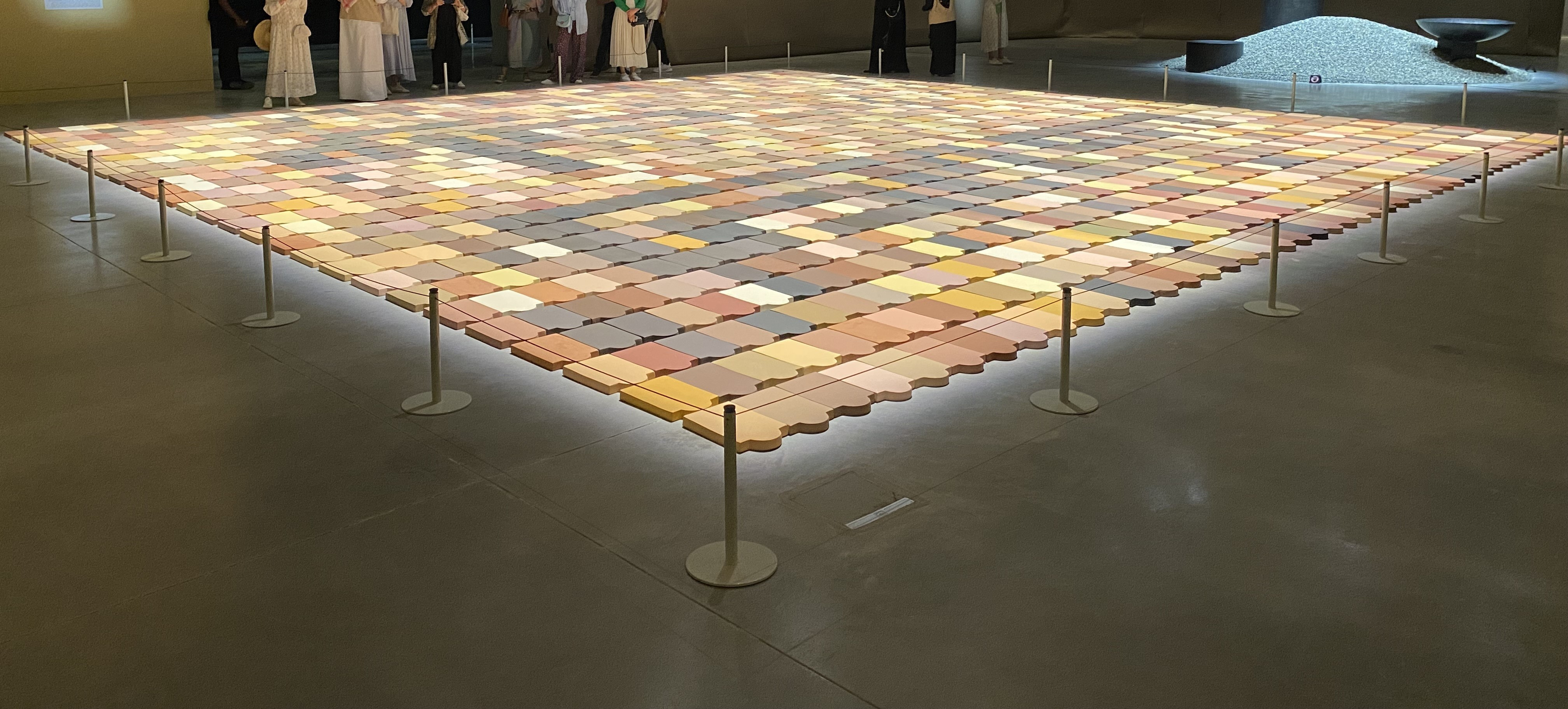
One of many art installations during the Inaugural Edition biennale.

Recently, the Hajj Terminal has been used as a venue to host Islamic art biennales by the Diriyah Biennale Foundation. Held from 23 January to 23 April 2023, over 70,000 square metres of the West Terminal was turned into an exhibition for the inaugural edition 'First House'. It featured pavilions, a theatre, workshops, and galleries. The second edition, 'And All That Is Between Them' was launched in early 2025 until 25 May. It exhibited historical Islamic treasures, rare antiquities, and contemporary artworks.

== Layout ==
The Hajj Terminal comprises two sides separated by a central access road: the West Terminal and the East Terminal. Until 2009, only the eastern side featured an apron. 440 tapering pylons were used to support Teflon-coated glass fibre roofs. Originally, the entire terminal had a capacity of 100,000 passengers a day and 30 aerobridges.

=== Design & technicalities ===
In 1977, American graphic designer Lance Wyman and his design firm, Wyman & Cannan, was entrusted to designing the airport's logo and wayfinding signage for the terminal. The design incorporated a variant of traditional Kufic script. First, the original writing for Jeddah was distorted by elongating it and mirroring it to form a stylised, plane symbol. Additionally, a new Arabic typography was developed to meet the bi-lingual requirements of airport signage. See-through screens and geometric elements were common in girih ornamentation, which was adapted into a free-standing information pylon. The pylon design would feature pictographic and directional units along with bilingual text panels, utilising standard international icons. The airport director was initially worried regarding the logo's legibility, and Wyman created a 5-foot-square painting of the logo. The director brought three local truck drivers, all of whom instantly read the word "Jeddah" and passed the test.

The Hajj Terminal has a built area of 105 acres, costing US $80 million in total. Each unit refers to the semi-conical fabric roof supported by four columns. The master plan of the terminal is composed of two identical halves, each with five modules. The fabric roof is made up of ten modules, each containing 21 semi-conical units stretched and formed by 32 radial cables. Every unit measures 150 by 150 feet at its base, rising to a 16-foot diameter centre support ring at the top. They would be supported by 45 metre high steel pylons on a square 45 metre grid, tapering from 2.5 metres to the base to 1 metre at the top. The central tension is attached to the radial cables, each of which radiate from the top of the columns. The overall combined design accumulate to an open-air feeling.

At times, the temperatures outside would reach a 130° degrees Fahrenheit, while those within the shaded area of the terminal that is not air-condition can be kept around 80°. To counter the extreme heat, the whiteness of the fabric itself was made to reflect 75% of solar radiation. Together with the design of the structure, allows for air circulation and keeps temperatures down. As a result, the fabric required a translucent quality that allowed it to transmit 7% of sunlight into the shaded area, diminishing the need for daytime lighting.

=== Amenities ===
In its original configuration, the Hajj Terminal featured a variety of amenities below the canopy for the pilgrims. Without exposure to the sun, various facilities included telephones and telexes, a post office, suqs (shopping areas), an information desk, and an aid station with a dispensary. Transport services were also provided via the central road, which featured a bus station, taxi stands, and a car rental agency. Additionally, there were restaurants and even kitchens as many pilgrims would prefer to cook their own meals.

== Statistics ==
Passenger capacity
Year	Capacity	Footnote
1985	950,000/year	
2018	1 million Hajj pilgrims/year and 9 million Umrah pilgrims/year	

== Awards ==
The following awards that resulted from the Hajj Terminal's success:

- 1981 Progressive Architecture Award
- 1983 AIA National Honor Award
- 1983 Aga Khan Award for Architecture
- 2010 AIA Twenty-Five Year Award

== Accidents & incidents ==
- On 11 February 2017, an Iraqi Airways Boeing 777's (registration YI-AQZ) No. 1 wheel on the left main landing gear was observed on fire. At the time, it had just arrived at the terminal and upon alerted, all 365 passengers were evacuated. Authorities link the fire to an improper assembly, leading to overheating and ignition.
