= The Smooth Career =

1967 film

- DVD cover
- Directed by: Haro Senft
- Written by: Haro Senft; Hans Noever
- Produced by: Haro Senft
- Starring: Bruno Ganz; Verena Buss; Wolfgang Büttner
- Cinematography: Jan Čuřík
- Edited by: Thurid Söhnlein
- Music by: Erich Ferstl
- Production company: Haro Senft Filmproduktion
- Distributed by: Constantin Film
- Release date: 25 May 1967
- Running time: 89 minutes
- Country: West Germany
- Language: German

The Smooth Career (German: Der sanfte Lauf) is a 1967 West German drama film directed by Haro Senft and starring Bruno Ganz, Verena Buss and Wolfgang Büttner. It was the first film produced by the Munich-based section of the New German Cinema movement.

== Synopsis ==
An engineer Bernhard Kral meets and marries Johanna and enjoys success during the laterstages of the economic miracle in Bavaria but is frustrated by how much he owes to his domineering father-in-law.

== Cast ==
- Bruno Ganz as Bernhard Kral
- Verena Buss as Johanna Benedikt
- Wolfgang Büttner as Richard Benedikt
- Lia Eibenschütz as Gertrud Benedikt
- Hans Putz as Wolf Kamper
- Dany Mann as Susanne Kamper
- Jan Kačer as Stefan
- Nina Divíšková as Věra
- Vladimír Hlavatý as Prof. König
- Peter Höfer as Alfred Reichert
- Rolf Ederer as Direktor Burckhardt
- Ralf Gregan as Joe Vielhaber
- Lutz Hochstraate as Klaus

== Bibliography ==
- Cowie, Peter & Elley, Derek. World Filmography: 1967. Fairleigh Dickinson University Press, 1977.
- Rother, Rainer (ed.) German Film: From the Archives of the Deutsche Kinemathek. Hatje Cantz Verlag, 2024.
