= Turner Construction =

American construction company

Turner Construction Company
- Type: Subsidiary
- Industry: Construction Management, Consulting
- Founded: 1902; 124 years ago
- Founder: Henry C. Turner
- Headquarters: 66 Hudson Boulevard East, New York, NY 10001, United States
- Area served: International
- Key people: Peter J. Davoren (President & CEO); Christa Andresky (CFO)
- Services: Construction
- Revenue: $29.2 billion (2025)
- Number of employees: 15,000 (2025)
- Parent: Hochtief
- Subsidiaries: Turner International; Turner Universal; Turner Logistics; Service Building Product; Tompkins Builders
- Website: turnerconstruction.com

The Turner Construction Company is an American construction services firm based in New York City. It is a subsidiary of the German company Hochtief and operates in the United States and in about 20 other countries.

Founded in 1902 by Henry Chandlee Turner, the company expanded nationally during the 20th century and has worked on large commercial and institutional projects, including sports venues. Hochtief purchased The Turner Corporation in 1999.

In the 2010s, investigators tied Turner to a years long bid-rigging and bribery scheme related to interior work on Bloomberg L.P. projects. Then vice president Ronald Olson pleaded guilty to a federal of tax evasion charge for accepting $1.5 million in bribes from subcontractors, and project superintendent Vito Nigro pleaded guilty to grand larceny and federal tax evasion.

Turner reported $29.2 billion in revenue in 2025 and a year-end project backlog of $44.3 billion.

== History ==
=== Early years ===
In 1902, Henry Chandlee Turner (1871-1954) founded Turner Construction Company with $25,000 in start-up capital, at 11 Broadway, in New York City. Turner's first job was a $690 project to build a concrete vault for Thrift Bank in the borough of Brooklyn. In 1904, a Scottish industrialist named Robert Gair hired Turner Construction to build several concrete buildings in Brooklyn, including a plant that was recognized as the largest reinforced concrete building in the United States at the time. Around the same time the company was developing plans for the Gair building, Turner began building concrete staircases for the New York City Subway. The original design showed the stairs were to be made of steel, but Turner persuaded Gair to use concrete as an alternative. The change led to additional contracts for staircases and platforms for the Interborough Rapid Transit Company's first subway line. The company established branch offices in Philadelphia in 1907, followed by Buffalo in 1908, and Boston in 1916. Within the first 15 years, Turner Construction Company constructed buildings for some of the country's largest businesses, including buildings for Western Electric and Standard Oil.

From World War I to the Great Depression, the company's billings grew to nearly $44 million. Like most industries, construction suffered during the economic collapse and Turner's volume fell to $2.5 million by 1933. The company recovered and revenues increased to $12 million by 1937. The company suspended commercial construction during the war years, focusing instead on building military camps, factories, and government buildings. In 1941, Henry Turner stepped down as president to serve as chairman and make room for his brother, Archie Turner, as president.

In October 1946, Henry Turner retired as chairman, handing the post to his ailing brother. For his replacement as president, Archie Turner selected Admiral Ben Moreell, the individual responsible for forming the Seabees. One month after Moreell's appointment, Archie Turner died of a heart attack.

=== 1950s–80s ===
Turner, together with three other main contractors Fuller, Slattery, Walsh, built the United Nations Secretariat Building in New York, which was completed in 1952. Turner built the One Chase Manhattan Plaza in 1956, and completed Madison Square Garden in 1967, and Lincoln Center in 1969. From the early 1950s to the late 1960s, the company opened offices in Cincinnati, Los Angeles, Cleveland, and San Francisco. In 1969, Turner issued over-the-counter stock and in 1972, the company's stock began trading on the American Stock Exchange. Throughout the 1970s, the company added offices in locations such as Atlanta, Seattle, and Portland. Notable projects included the Vanderbilt University Medical Center Hospital in 1974 and the John Fitzgerald Kennedy Library in 1977.

Howard Sinclair Turner became president in 1965, and was chairman from 1970 to 1977, when he was succeeded by Walter B. Shaw. In 1984, Shaw appointed Herbert Conant as president.

=== 1990–2019 ===
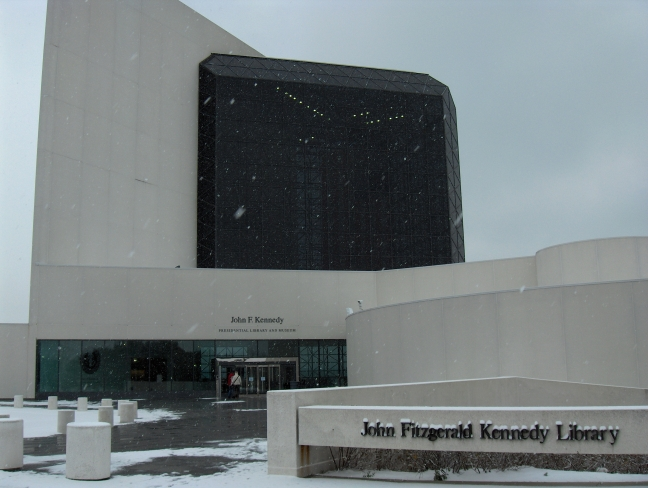
The John F. Kennedy Library

Turner Construction Company erected several professional sports stadiums during the 1990s. Sports construction was not new to the company: Turner's first sports contract was construction of the promenade at Harvard Stadium in 1910, followed by Pitt Stadium for the University of Pittsburgh in 1925. In 1995, the company completed construction of the Rose Garden in Portland, Oregon. In 1996, it built Charlotte, North Carolina's Bank of America Stadium, followed by completion of Sports Authority Field at Mile High in 2001.

In August 1999, Hochtief of Germany purchased The Turner Corporation for $370 million. Following the acquisition, Turner gained access to Hochtief’s operations in Australia and the United Kingdom, as well as its heavy construction work.

In 2002, Turner Construction expanded its presence in the Washington, D.C. area by acquiring J.A. Jones-Tompkins Builders, Inc., the former subsidiary of J.A. Jones Construction Company. Tompkins Builders, Inc., a new entity, is now a wholly owned subsidiary of Turner Construction. By 2016, Turner had 45 office locations around the world.

In August 2017, Portland officials said Turner closed two downtown lanes without required permits; the city withheld inspections until the fine was paid. Transportation commissioner Dan Saltzman criticized the lane closure and said the city would "hold them accountable".

==== 2019 Cincinnati Center City Development site fatal accident ====
One worker was killed and four were injured in a partial collapse on November 25, 2019, in a 14-story luxury apartment at 4th & Race under construction in Cincinnati being built by Turner for Cincinnati Center City Development Corporation (3CDC) and Flaherty & Collins. Concrete was being poured onto the seventh floor, which was being supported from below on temporary shoring placed on the sixth floor. Workers were inspecting for seepage from the sixth floor when the floor above collapsed from the weight of the concrete. A worker who had gone missing in the collapse was found dead more than a day later in the rubble.

Turner's previous fatality was in 2012 in Hillsboro, Oregon.

=== 2020–present ===
In 2020, Turner and Flatiron won a $3 billion contract to build Terminal 1 at San Diego International Airport, due for completion in 2028.

Three new NFL stadiums followed. With Gilbane, Turner began the Buffalo Bills' $2.1 billion New Highmark Stadium in Orchard Park in 2023. It is due for the 2026 season. A Turner-AECOM Hunt joint venture started the Tennessee Titans' $2.1 billion New Nissan Stadium in Nashville in 2024. It is due in 2027. The same partnership was hired again in 2025 for the Cleveland Browns' $2.4 billion Huntington Bank Field in Brook Park, Ohio. It will be Ohio's first enclosed stadium and is due in 2029.

In June 2024, a worker on scaffolding at a Turner jobsite University of Chicago Medical Center died after falling down nine stories. A second worker was critically injured as well. This was not the first accident at this site and two workers were injured on the same site in December 2023. In June 2025, Turner and its subcontractor Adjustable Forms Concrete reached a settlement of $23.5 million with the family of the dead worker. Safety violations were found following the accident and OSHA fined Turner construction $14,518. The subcontractor was also cited.

Turner agreed in 2024 to buy Dornan Engineering Group, an Irish mechanical and electrical contractor. The deal closed in 2025. By the third quarter of 2025, the company's backlog passed $40 billion, up 20% from the year before. About 40% came from semiconductor plants, data centers and biopharmaceutical sites.

Data centers became a major driver of Turner’s recent growth. Data center projects represented approximately 37% of the company’s 2025 year-end backlog, while Data Center Dynamics reported that Turner’s data-center revenue more than doubled during the first nine months of 2025.

Engineering News-Record ranked the company first on its 2026 Top 400 Contractors list.

== Bid rigging scheme ==
In February 2018, investigators with the Manhattan District Attorney's Office started looking into Turner Construction and Bloomberg LP over suspected construction fraud by employees in each company and 22 subcontractors. There was conspiracy, bribery and kickbacks involved which occurred between 2010 and 2017.

In the multi-year bribery and bid rigging scheme involving Turner, a former Turner vice president, Ronald Olson, pleaded guilty to bribery in July 2020. Olson pleaded guilty to tax evasion for US$1.5 million he received in connection with Bloomberg jobs while he was working for Turner. He received bribes from subcontractors in exchange for awarding them contracts for Bloomberg L.P. projects. He was one of 14 individuals facing charges over this scandal. In 2021, Olson was sentenced to 46 months in federal prison.

== Operations ==
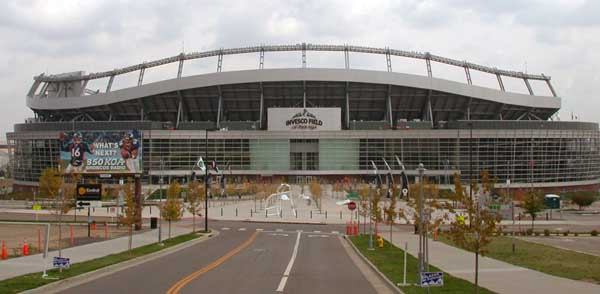
Exterior of Invesco Field at Mile High in October 2004

Turner has 46 offices in the U.S., is active in 20 countries around the world, and averages 1,500 projects per year. Turner services include construction management, general contracting, consulting, construction procurement, insurance, and risk management. Turner ranked No. 1 on Engineering News-Record's 2025 Top 400 Contractors list, based on 2024 revenue, and again ranked No. 1 on ENR’s 2026 Top 400 Contractors list. The 2026 ranking marked Turner’s sixth consecutive year in the top position. The company also ranked No. 1 on ENR's 2025 Top 100 Green Building Contractors list.

In 2026, Turner made SafeT Coach, an artificial-intelligence-based safety assistant developed for use across its jobsites, available to other construction professionals.
