= Bruchbach (Haggraben) =

River in Germany

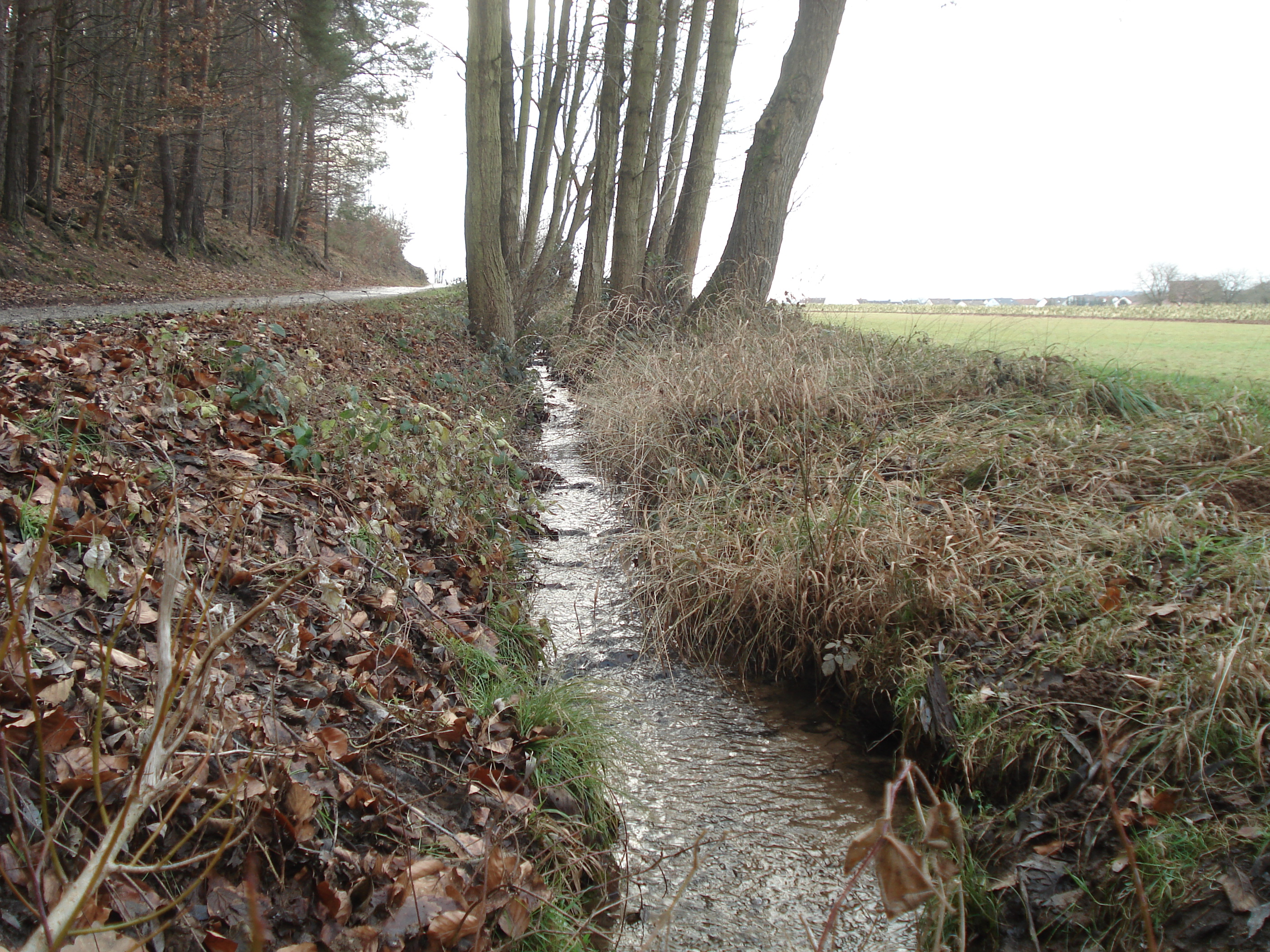
- The Bruchbach north of Kleinostheim

Location
- Country: Germany
- State: Bavaria

Physical characteristics
- Mouth
  - location: Haggraben
  - coordinates: 50.0214°N 9.0639°E

Basin features
- Progression: Haggraben→ Forchbach→ Main→ Rhine→ North Sea

Bruchbach is a small river of Bavaria, Germany. It is a right tributary of the Haggraben near Kleinostheim.

== See also ==
- List of rivers of Bavaria
