= Kahl Nuclear Power Plant =

Nuclear power plant in Germany

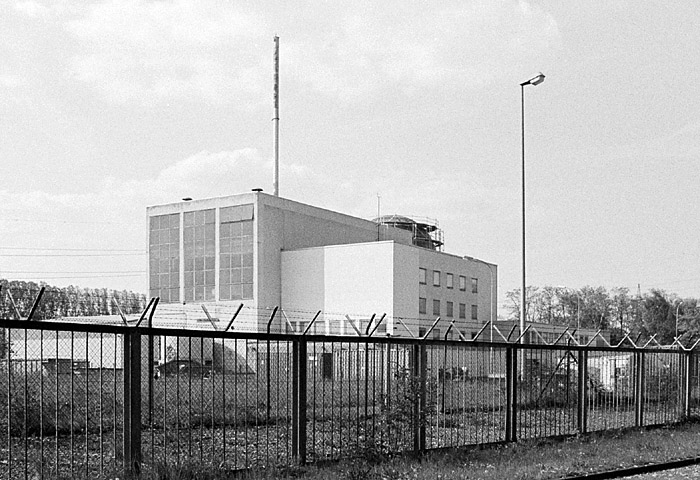
- VAK Kahl
- Country: Germany
- Coordinates: 50°3′32.83″N 8°59′14.2″E
- Status: Decommissioned
- Construction began: 1958
- Commission date: July 17, 1961
- Decommission date: November 25, 1985
- Operator: VAK Kahl

Power generation
- Units decommissioned: 1 x 16 MW
- Annual net output: 83 GWh (in 1985)

External links
- Commons: Related media on Commons

The Kahl plant was the first nuclear power plant ever to be built in Germany. It was located in Karlstein am Main and was an (at the time) experimental boiling water reactor. It was built by General Electric and supplied by Siemens. At the end of 2008, the demolition works had been finished.

The station was the subject of the 1961 short documentary film, Kahl.

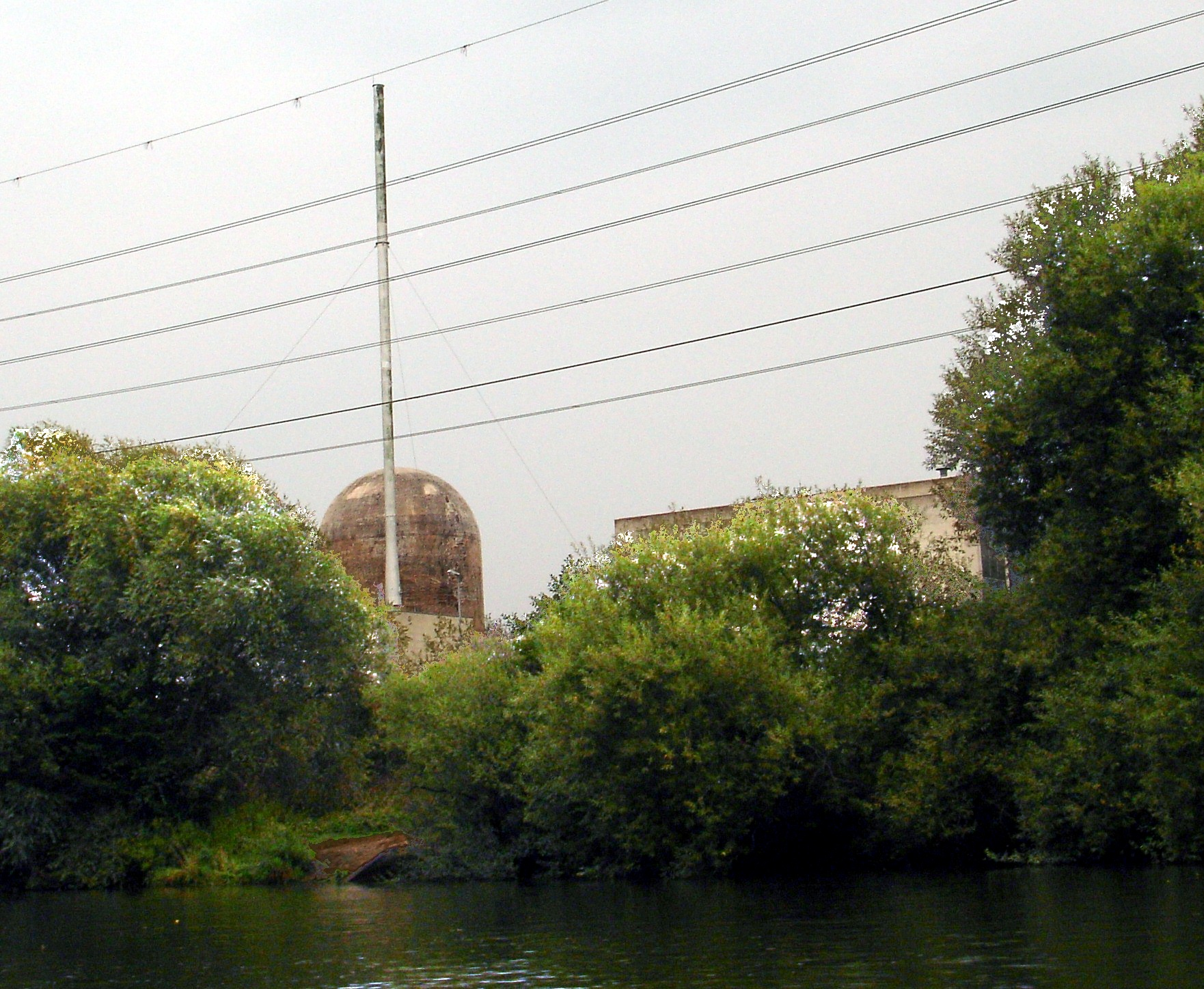
The plant in 2005.

== See also ==
- Nuclear power in Germany
