= Karlstein am Main =

- Municipality
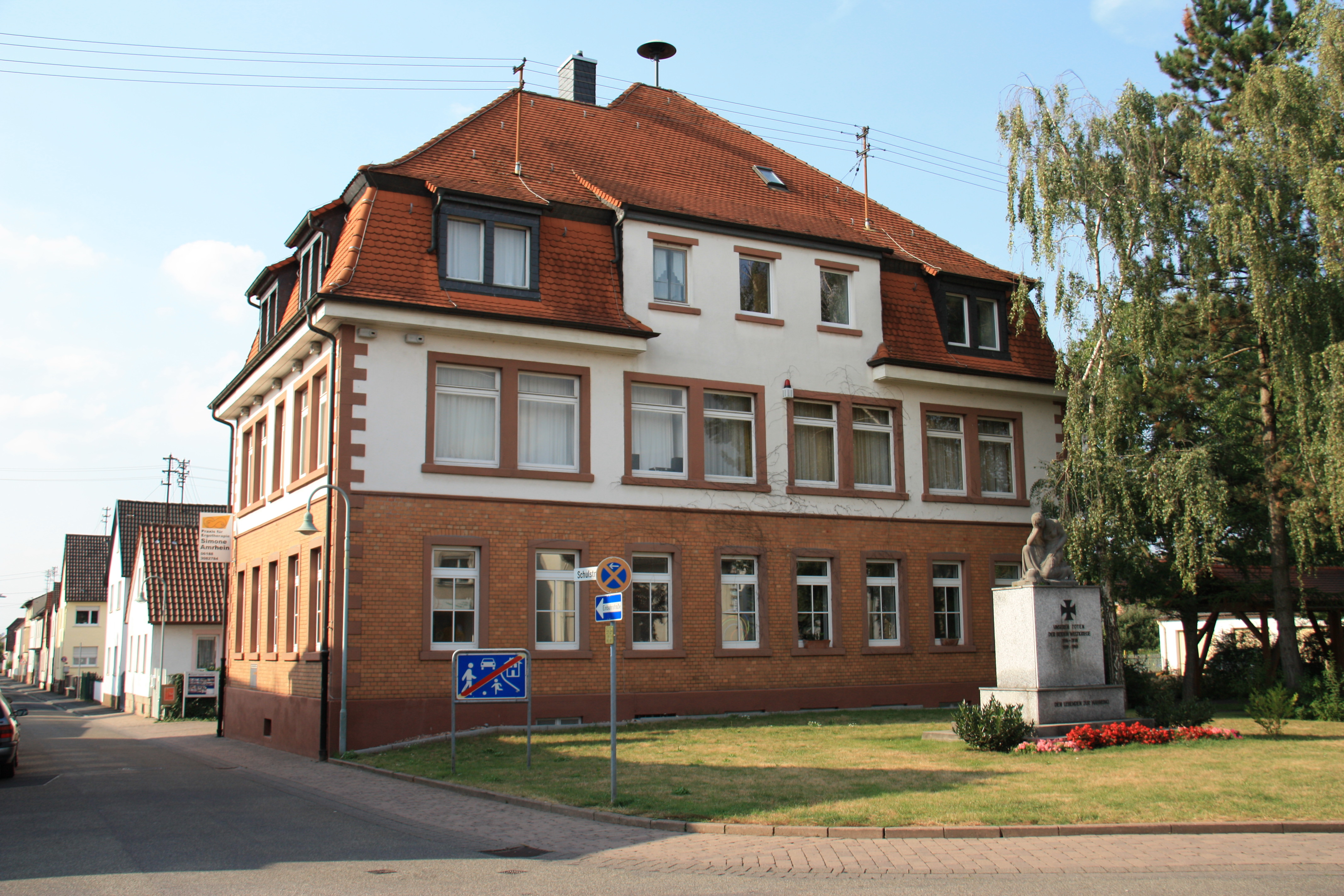
- Old town hall in Dettingen

- Coat of arms

- Location of Karlstein am Main within Aschaffenburg district
- Interactive map of Karlstein am Main
- Location within Germany Location within Bavaria
- Coordinates: 50°2′46″N 9°1′23″E
- Country: Germany
- State: Bavaria
- Admin. region: Lower Franconia
- District: Aschaffenburg
- Subdivisions: 2 Ortsteile

Government
  - Mayor (2023–29): Peter Kreß

Area
  - Total: 12.68 km^{2} (4.90 sq mi)
- Elevation: 110 m (360 ft)

Population (2025-12-31)
  - Total: 7,531
  - Density: 593.9/km^{2} (1,538/sq mi)
- Time zone: UTC+01:00 (CET)
  - Summer (DST): UTC+02:00 (CEST)
- Postal codes: 63791
- Dialling codes: 06188
- Vehicle registration: AB
- Website: www.karlstein.de

Karlstein am Main (officially Karlstein a. Main) is a municipality in the Aschaffenburg district in the Regierungsbezirk of Lower Franconia (Unterfranken) in Bavaria, Germany. It is the westernmost settlement in Bavaria. Karlstein's Gemeindeteile are Dettingen and Großwelzheim, the former being notable as the site of the Battle of Dettingen during the War of the Austrian Succession. In the 20th century, the town was the site of the, now decommissioned, Großwelzheim Nuclear Power Plant.

== Geography ==
=== Location ===
Gemeindeteile

Karlstein am Main lies on the River Main, and on the railway between Frankfurt am Main and Aschaffenburg, 16 km northwest of Aschaffenburg.

=== Gemeindeteile ===
Karlstein's Gemeindeteile are Dettingen and Großwelzheim.

== History ==
=== Prehistory ===
The placename Dettingen suggests an Alamannic settlement (3rd to 14th century), and the placename Großwelzheim a Frankish one.

=== First mentions ===
Großwelzheim had its first documentary mention in a donation document from Lorsch Abbey in 772. Then, the village was called Walinesheim. The placename has the —heim ending that was typical for places founded in Frankish times. The name comes from a count named Walah who held sway in the Maingau.

Dettingen had its first documentary mention in a donation document from Emperor Otto II.

=== Battle of Dettingen ===
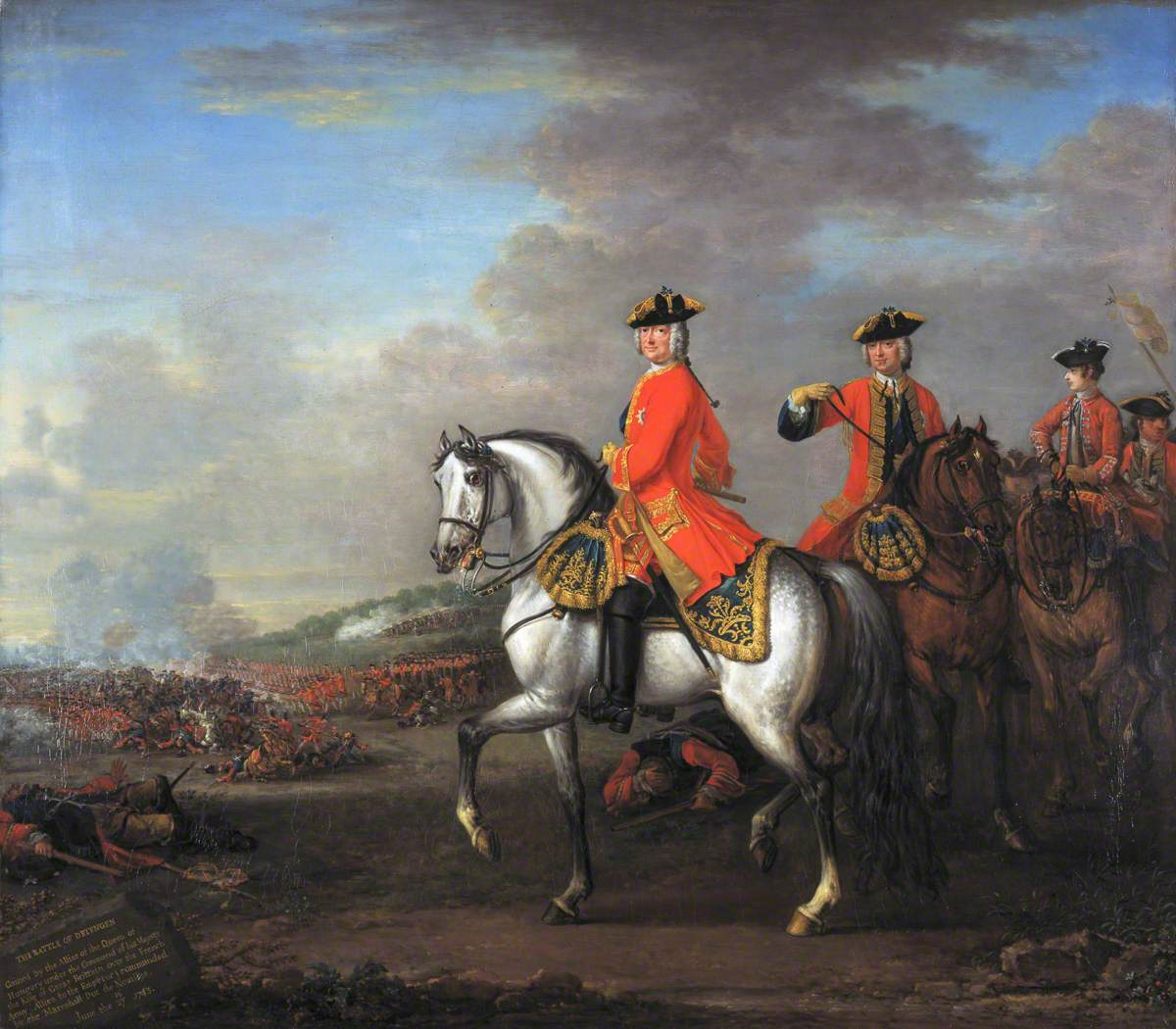
George II at the Battle of Dettingen by John Wootton, 1743

During the War of the Austrian Succession a battle took place in the Karlstein area on 27 June 1743, known as the Battle of Dettingen. The so-called "Pragmatic Army", made up of 35,000 Britons, Hanoverians and Austrians found itself fighting a 23,000 strong French army. The Pragmatic Army overcame the French, thus giving rise to the legend of the "Wandering Englishman", which has been handed down in Dettingen to this day. The Battle of Dettingen marked the last time a British monarch, King George II, personally led his troops into battle. George Frideric Handel wrote the Dettingen Te Deum in honour of the British victory, which was first performed on 27 November 1743 – exactly five months after the battle began – in George II's presence.

=== Amalgamation ===
In the course of municipal reform in Bavaria came the merger of the two municipalities of Dettingen and Großwelzheim on 1 July 1975. In a vote, the new municipality's citizens decided on the name Karlstein, which had cropped up as early as some time about 1000 in a description of the Aschaffenburg Forest Region, and was also the name given an old municipality limit stone between Dettingen and Großwelzheim.

=== Etymology ===
The name Karlstein supposedly, according to a traditional anecdote, goes back to Charlemagne (who is called Karl der Große in German). Charlemagne reportedly often stayed in Seligenstadt, right across the river, and was much given to hunting in the Spessart. To reach there, he would cross the Main in his ship to the place then still known as Tettingen. The stone at the landing, or even the limit stone between Tettingen and Walinesheim, then came to be known as Karlstein.

== Politics ==
=== Municipal council ===
The council is made up of 20 council members, not counting the mayor.

	CSU	SPD	GREENS	FDP	Total
2008	13	5	1	1	20 seats

(as at municipal election held on 2 March 2008)

=== Coat of arms ===
The municipality's arms might be described thus: Party per fess wavy, azure the Cross of Dettingen argent, argent an atom symbol with three orbits of the first and a nucleus gules.

The wavy parting refers to the municipality's location on the Main, which is also part of the municipality's name. Since the municipality was formed out of the two former municipalities of Dettingen and Großwelzheim in 1975, the arms display charges from each former municipality's arms. The uniquely shaped cross above the parting is the so-called Cross of Dettingen (or Dettinger Kreuz in German). It comes from Late Gothic times and is found in Saint Hippolytus's Church (Kirche St. Hippolyt) in the constituent municipality of Dettingen. The atom symbol below the parting is taken from the arms formerly borne by the municipality of Großwelzheim. Within municipality limits, Germany's first nuclear power station was built, although it was only experimental. In 1960, it began feeding electricity into the power grid. The reactor was shut down in 1985, and by the end of 2008, it had been fully removed.

The arms have been borne since 13 October 1977.

== Economy ==
=== Nuclear power stations ===
On 13 November 1960, the Kahl Nuclear Power Plant, which despite the name is wholly within Karlstein's limits, came into service. The neighbouring municipality of Kahl am Main merely stood godfather at the christening. On 25 November 1985, after running for 25 years, the power station was shut down. In 1988 the first dismantling work began, ending by late 2008.

The Großwelzheim hot steam reactor was in the same area; it was fully dismantled by 1998.
