= Forchbach =

River in Germany

- The Forchbach before its mouth

Location
- Country: Germany
- State: Bavaria

Physical characteristics
- Mouth
  - location: Main
  - coordinates: 50.0377°N 9.0325°E
- Length: 3.4 km (2.1 mi)

Basin features
- Progression: Main→ Rhine→ North Sea

Forchbach is a small river of Bavaria, Germany. It flows into the Main in Karlstein am Main.

== See also ==
- List of rivers of Bavaria
