= Kleinostheim =

- Municipality
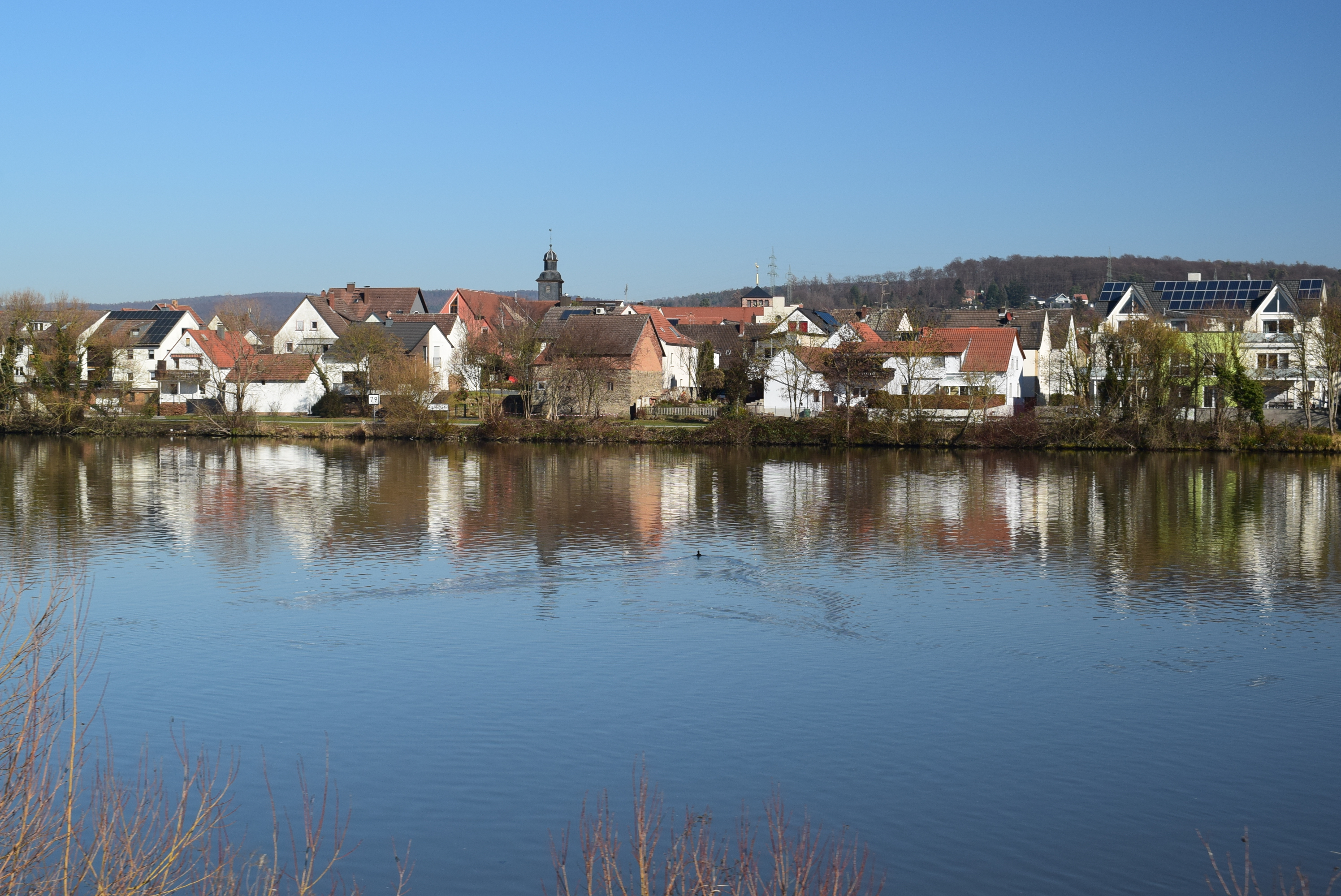
- Kleinostheim seen over the river Main

- Coat of arms

- Location of Kleinostheim within Aschaffenburg district
- Interactive map of Kleinostheim
- Location within Germany Location within Bavaria
- Coordinates: 50°0′N 9°4′E
- Country: Germany
- State: Bavaria
- Admin. region: Unterfranken
- District: Aschaffenburg
- Subdivisions: 4 Ortsteile

Government
  - Mayor (2020–26): Dennis Neßwald (FW)

Area
  - Total: 13.89 km^{2} (5.36 sq mi)
- Elevation: 114 m (374 ft)

Population (2025-12-31)
  - Total: 8,153
  - Density: 587.0/km^{2} (1,520/sq mi)
- Time zone: UTC+01:00 (CET)
  - Summer (DST): UTC+02:00 (CEST)
- Postal codes: 63801
- Dialling codes: 06027
- Vehicle registration: AB
- Website: www.kleinostheim.de

Kleinostheim is a municipality in the Aschaffenburg district in the Regierungsbezirk of Lower Franconia (Unterfranken) in Bavaria, Germany.

== Geography ==
=== Location ===
Gemeindeteile

The municipality of Kleinostheim is about 40 kilometers east southeast of Frankfurt am Main about a half hour drive from it. Kleinostheim lies upstream from Frankfurt on the river Main. It is at the western edge of the Spessart range near Aschaffenburg. Like the nearby city of Mainz to the west, the 50th parallel north goes through the municipality.

=== Gemeindeteile ===
Kleinostheim's four Gemeindeteile are Kleinostheim, Waldstadt, Industriegebiet West and Wingert. The later three, however, are not officially recognized.

=== municipality of Kleinostheim as a residential town ===
Owing to the favourable transport connections over an important north-south railway link and the Autobahnen A 3 and A 45, and because it lies on the Rhine-Danube waterway and in the middle of the Frankfurt Rhine Main Region, the municipality offers many advantages as a location. Kleinostheim benefits from lying near prosperous cities such as Frankfurt, Offenbach and Aschaffenburg by serving as a commuter town. Since the 1960s, the municipality's population has more than doubled from 4,000 to over 8,000.

== History ==
Kleinostheim was most likely founded in the 6th century as Ossenheim by the Franks, and in 975, it had its first documentary mention. For almost a thousand years it was ecclesiastically and politically tightly bound with Saints Peter's and Alexander's Monastery in Aschaffenburg.

On 21 January 1945, the municipality suffered the most dreadful day in its history. In an air raid, more than 500 buildings were either damaged or utterly destroyed, and 61 people were killed. Commemorating this is a memorial site, renovated in 1995, at the graveyard.

In 1951, the third Saint Lawrence's Church (Laurentiuskirche) in the Catholic parish's over 1000-year history was consecrated. Nearby, in 1955, so was Saint Mark's Church (Markuskirche) for the new Evangelical parish.

In 1814, Kleinostheim passed to Bavaria, having belonged before that, since the 10th century, to the Electorate of Mainz.

== Politics ==
=== Municipal council ===
As of the municipal election held on 15 March 2020, the Kleinostheim Gemeinderat (excluding the first mayor) comprises 20 seats, distributed as follows:

Party	Seats
Christian Social Union (CSU)	7
Free Voters (Freie Wähler, FW)	7
Alliance 90/The Greens (Greens)	3
Social Democratic Party (SPD)	2
Free Democratic Party (FDP)	1

=== Coat of arms ===
The municipality's arms might be described thus: Gules a base wavy argent, above which an oaktree with five leaves Or between a wheel spoked of six and a spade blade in pale of the second.

Kleinostheim lies between the Main and the Spessart, which is well known for its oaks. This is symbolized by the oaktree in the arms. The wavy base refers to the municipality's geographical location between the Main and the Spessart. Kleinostheim is a very old municipality with an agricultural history going back more than twenty centuries. Standing for this is the spade blade, which was actually an archaeological find from Celtic times. The Wheel of Mainz and the tinctures gules and argent (red and silver) are taken from the arms borne by the Electorate of Mainz and recalls the municipality's former allegiance to this state.

The arms were conferred on 5 June 1975.

=== Town partnerships ===
- Bassens, Gironde, France since 1975

== Personages ==
- Franz Adolf Gräbner (b. 8 October 1944 in Hörstein; d. 2 April 2004 in Frankfurt) was a well known artistic painter. Gräbner was buried here, as it was also the last place where he lived. In the books that he had published, Mühlen und Landschaften der Heimat and Gemälde und Zeichnungen, some of his works are reproduced.

== Transport ==
- Railway station (Frankfurt - Aschaffenburg – Würzburg mainline)
- Autobahn A 3, between Frankfurt (roughly 40 km away) and Würzburg (roughly 80 km away).
- Connection to the A 45.
