= Head of the Armed Forces =

Commander-in-chief of the British Armed Forces

- Coat of arms of The King

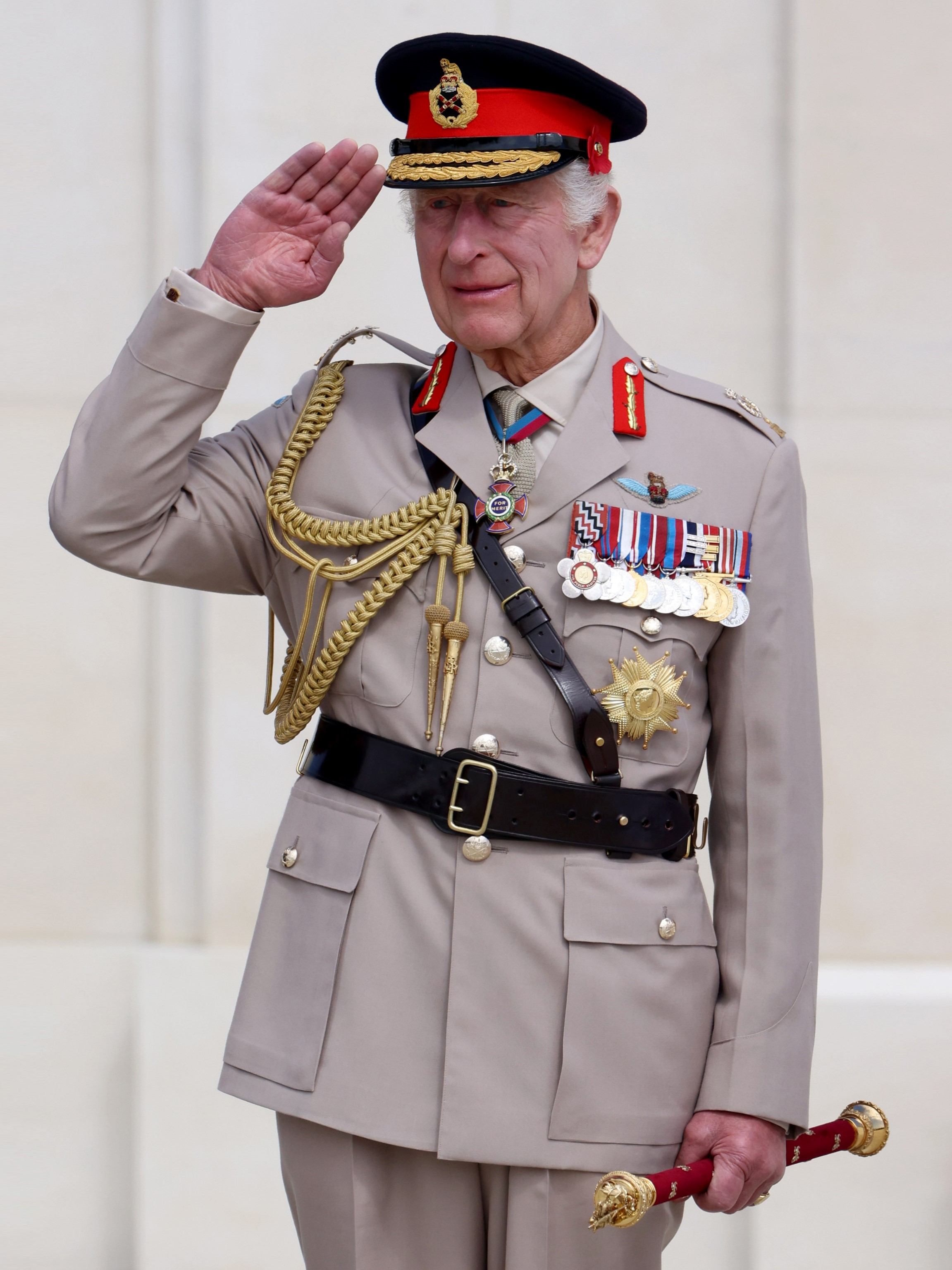
- Incumbent; Charles III; King of the United Kingdom since 8 September 2022
- British Armed Forces
- Style: His Majesty
- Type: Commander-in-chief
- Status: Supreme Commanding Authority
- Website: www.royal.uk

Head of the Armed Forces is the position of the sovereign of the United Kingdom as commander-in-chief of the British Armed Forces. Supreme military authority is vested in the monarch and extends to the exercise of several personal prerogatives. However, routine administration of the military is delegated as a matter of law to the Defence Council of the United Kingdom, a body officially charged with the direction and command of the Armed Forces. As the Defence Council and its service boards are all a part of the Ministry of Defence, which itself is a ministerial department of the Government of the United Kingdom, the prime minister makes the key decisions on the use of the Armed Forces, while the secretary of state for defence assists the prime minister in the development of defence policy and administers the day-to-day military operations.

== Military oath of allegiance ==
Before joining the military all recruits of the British Armed Forces (other than Officers in the Royal Navy) (Note: Historically, members of the Royal Navy 'entered' service (rather than enlisted) and did not swear an oath as the Navy's existence stems from the Sovereign's prerogative rather than an act of parliament. However, since the Armed Forces Act 2006, ratings have 'enlisted' in line with the other services and are required to take the oath or affirmation. Commissioned officers of the Royal Navy are still not required to take the oath or affirmation.) must take the following oath:

I... swear by Almighty God (do solemnly, and truly declare and affirm) that I will be faithful and bear true allegiance to His Majesty King Charles III, His Heirs and Successors, and that I will, as in duty bound, honestly and faithfully defend His Majesty, His Heirs and Successors, in Person, Crown and Dignity against all enemies, and will observe and obey all orders of His Majesty, His Heirs and Successors, and of the [Generals/Admirals/Air Officers] and Officers set over me.

== Duties and functions ==
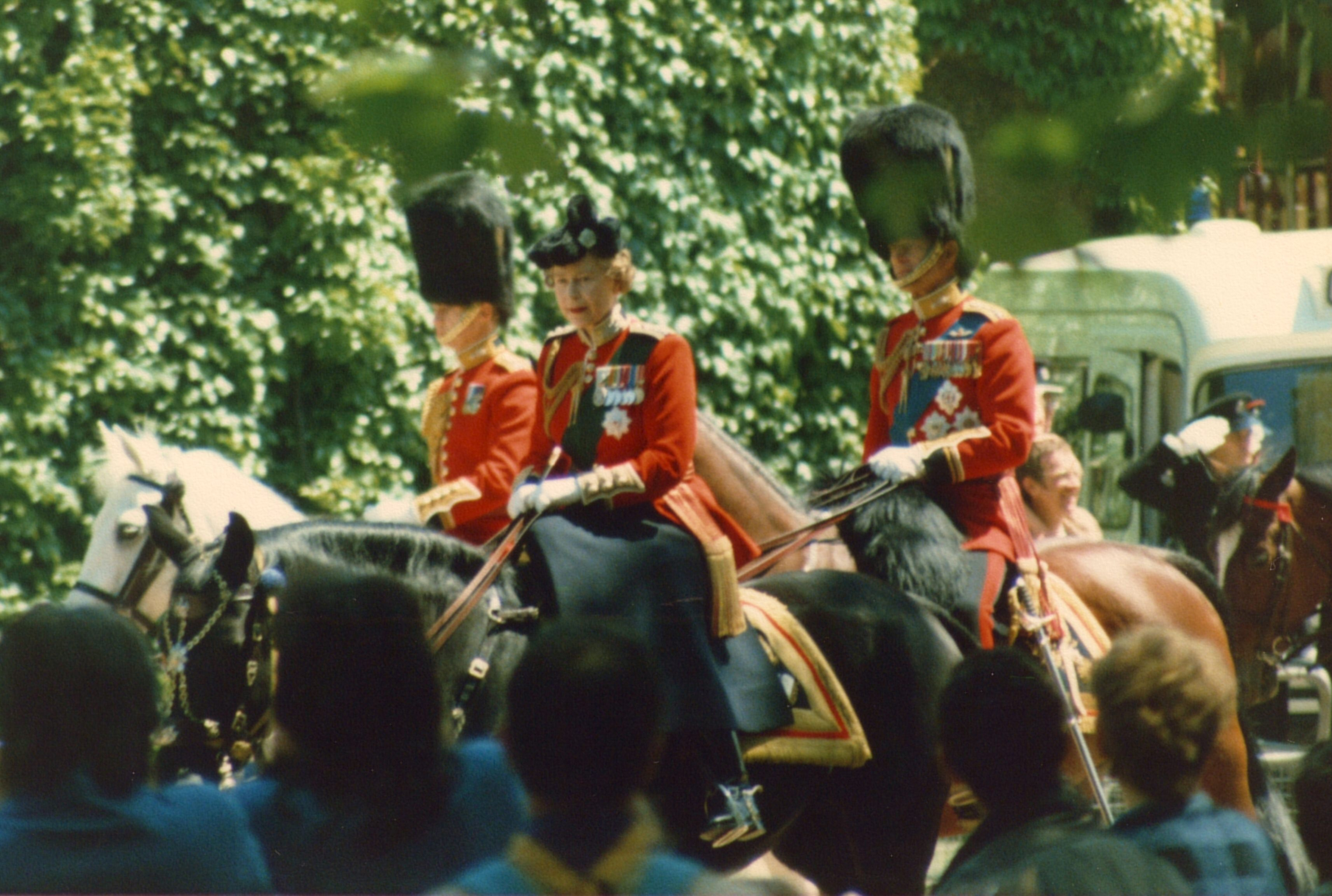
Elizabeth II in military uniform

Supreme command and control over the Armed Forces vests in the Sovereign by virtue of the royal prerogative; this constitutional arrangement has existed in the United Kingdom and its antecedents for centuries. As a matter of statute law however, day-to-day administration and control of the military is carried out on behalf of the reigning King or Queen by the Defence Council through the Ministry of Defence and its subordinate service boards. This delegation of command authority extends to matters of mobilisation, the recruitment of non-commissioned officers, and the issuance of commands through the command hierarchy of the three services. That notwithstanding, the delegation of daily command authority does not in any way affect the Crown's personal prerogatives in relation to the Armed Forces.

A number of powers, duties, and functions are reposed in the Sovereign in his or her capacity as Head of the Armed Forces. Long-standing constitutional convention, however, generally requires the Sovereign to exercise these personal prerogatives in accordance with the advice of ministers of the Crown responsible to Parliament, namely the Prime Minister and His Majesty's Secretary of State for Defence. The Prime Minister (in consultation with the Cabinet) makes the key political decisions on the use of the Armed Forces while the Defence Secretary administers daily military operations. Nevertheless, the supreme military authority belongs to the Sovereign and not to the Government of the day. The Sovereign thus enjoys the right to be consulted before acting on ministerial advice, the right to encourage a given course of military action, and the right to warn against or request a reconsideration of the same. In addition, the monarch has a number of reserve powers at his disposal, albeit rarely invoked, to uphold responsible government and prevent unlawful use of the Armed Forces. To this end, the King has plenary authority to:

- Declare war, make peace, or institute hostilities falling short of war;
- Issue regulations for the Armed Forces;
- Commission those officers of the Armed Forces who receive their appointment by way of royal warrant, including all flag, senior and junior officers;
- Maintain a Royal Navy;
- Raise an Army, but only when authorised by Parliament pursuant to the Bill of Rights 1689;
- Deploy and use the Armed Forces overseas;
- Deploy and use the Armed Forces on British soil to maintain peace and order in support of civilian government authorities (e.g., to maintain essential services during a strike);
- Order warships in times of urgent national necessity;
- Regulate trade with hostiles;
- Engage in angary in times of war, that is to appropriate the property of a neutral which is within the realm where necessity requires; and
- Exercise extraordinary powers in the event of a grave national emergency, including those to enter upon, take and destroy private property.

The King regularly receives the agenda in advance of all Cabinet meetings and its committees, particularly the National Security Council. He also receives the minutes of the meetings of all of these committees and all Cabinet documents. Likewise, the King regularly receives the Secretary of State for Defence in audience to discuss defence documents and policies; if he requires, his Private Secretary can seek additional information from the Ministry of Defence. His Majesty also receives regular reports from the Chief of the General Staff, the First Sea Lord and Chief of the Naval Staff, and the Chief of the Air Staff that cover all important developments in military matters. His Majesty further receives the Chief of the Defence Staff in audience to discuss tri-service military matters.

== Relationships with military personnel ==
Since the reign of Elizabeth II, the Monarch has been affectionately referred to as "The Boss" in informal settings by some members of the Armed Forces, reflecting the Monarch's connection to the Armed Forces through their position as Commander-in-Chief and the Oath service personnel take when joining the Armed Forces.

=== The monarch and the Defence Services Secretary ===
The Defence Services Secretary is an officer of the Royal Household. The DSS is appointed by Royal Warrant from the three Services on a rotational basis. The current occupant is Rear Admiral James Norman Macleod. He is the primary channel of communication between the Monarch, in his capacity as Commander-in-Chief of the Armed Forces, and the officers and commands of the British Armed Forces. His office provides the Monarch with the information and documentation related to defence affairs that he requires to perform his military functions. The office was created in 1964 by Queen Elizabeth II as part of the centralization of military affairs into a single defence ministry. The DSS maintains a direct link with the offices of the chiefs of staff of the Army, Navy and Air Force. The Defence Services Secretary is responsible to the King, the Secretary of State for Defence and the Chief of the Defence Staff for tri-service military appointments and works with the Military Secretary, the Air Secretary and Naval Secretary. He submits the names of the officers nominated for promotion to the King through his private secretary. The King makes appointments to the ranks of rear-admiral, major-general, air vice-marshal and above directly.

=== The monarch and the Ministry of Defence ===
The Ministry of Defence is the highest level military headquarters charged with formulating and executing defence policy for the Armed Forces; it employed 57,000 civilians in October 2017.

The command authority of the Armed Forces flows from the monarch, in his capacity as commander-in-chief of the Armed Forces, to the various officers and councils of the defence ministry. The Monarch appoints the members of these committees to exercise day-to-day administration of His Majesty's Armed Forces. The committees are the Defence Council, the Army Board, the Navy Board, the Air Force Board, the Defence Board and the Chiefs of Staffs Committee. The Defence Council, composed of senior representatives of the services and the Ministry of Defence, provides the "formal legal basis for the conduct of defence" and is chaired by the Defence Secretary.

=== The monarch and the command staffs ===
Each service branch of the Armed Forces maintains its own command staff that administers the affairs of its service. The staffs receive their authority to act and to exercise command and control over their units from the monarch and his Defence Council.

Until 2012 each of the three services also had one or more commands with a (four-star) commander-in-chief in charge of operations. These were, latterly: Commander-in-Chief Fleet (CINCFLEET – sharing a Command HQ with Commander-in-Chief Naval Home Command (CINCNAVHOME)), Commander-in-Chief, Land Forces (CINCLAND) and Commander-in-Chief Air (CINCAIR). (At one time there were many more Naval, Military and Air Commands, each with (in many cases) their own Commanders-in-Chief.) Since 2012, however, full operational command has been vested in the three Chiefs of Staff, and the appointment of distinct Commanders-in-Chief has been discontinued. This change was implemented in response to the 2011 Levene report, which advised that it would serve to "streamline top-level decision-making, simplify lines of accountability... remove duplication between the posts and also provide impetus to the leaning of the senior leadership".

=== The monarch and military appointments ===
Under the Monarch's regulations for the Army, Navy and Air Force, the Monarch is responsible for making a large number of appointments to senior military posts. Currently the Commander-in-Chief approves appointments at the two-star level and up. The names of the officers appointed to these and other posts in the armed forces are regularly published by the Ministry of Defence.

Most military appointments are issued in the form of Letters Patent or a Royal Warrant; both are forms by which the royal will is expressed. The Defence Council of the United Kingdom is created by Letters Patent that also set out its powers and membership. The King signs a royal warrant directing the issue of the Letters Patent and ordering the Great Seal of The Realm to be affixed to them. Letters patent are the most formal method of appointment and are used infrequently.

The more frequent and simplest method of appointment is by Royal warrant signed by the Monarch and his Secretary of State for Defence. The Secretary of State first makes an informal submission of the name of a candidate, after the Monarch has signified his approval the Defence Ministry prepares the formal Warrant of Appointment. The Warrants (alongside all other Defence documentation) are sent at the end of each weekday to the King's Private Secretary by Dispatch box. The King and the Secretary of State for Defence then sign the warrant.

== Gallery of images ==
Historical and recent images of the Commander-in-Chief, British Armed Forces
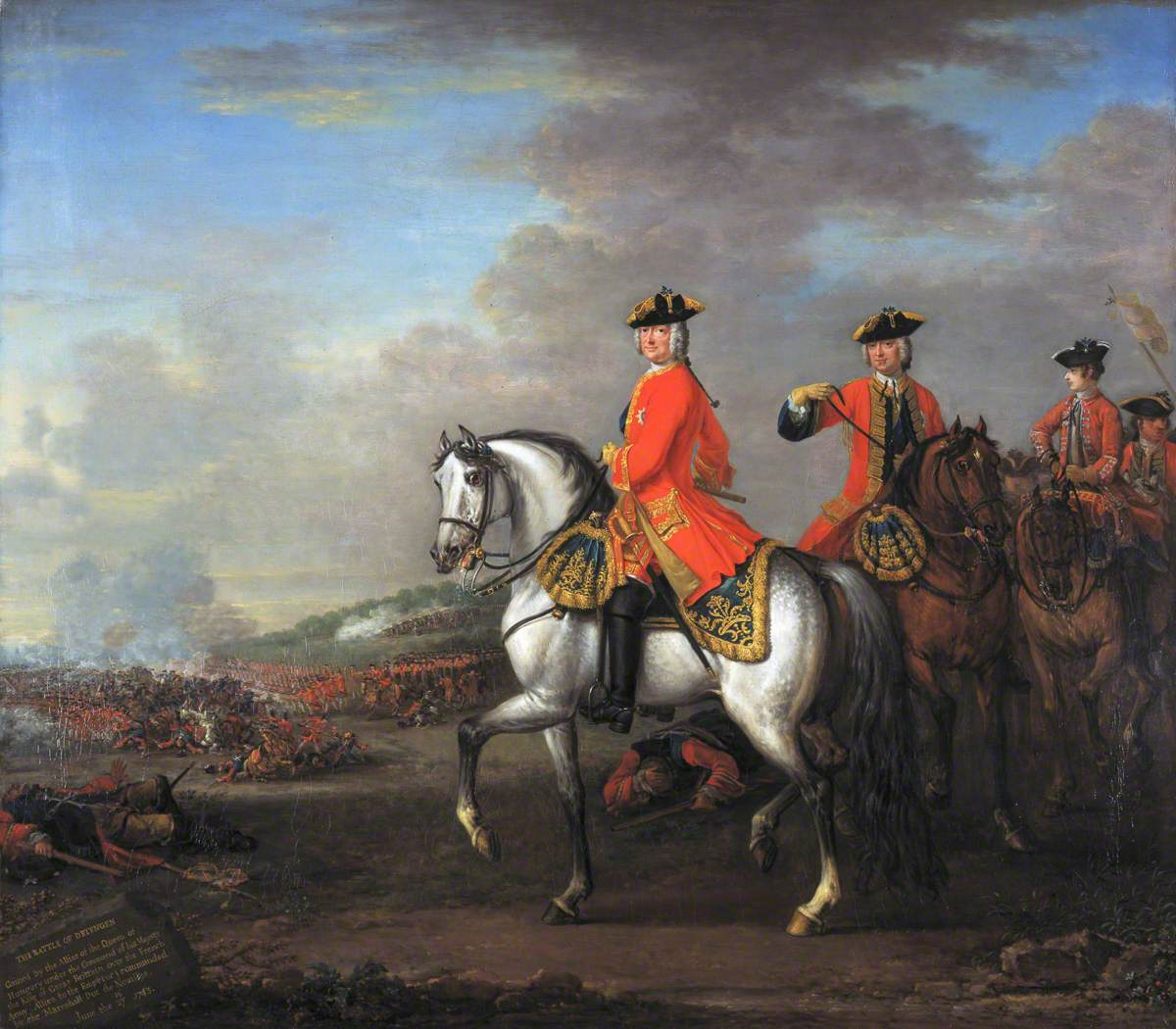
George II at the Battle of Dettingen oil-on-canvas, by John Wootton. King George II at the Battle of Dettingen in 1743 remains the last time a British monarch personally led his troops into battle.

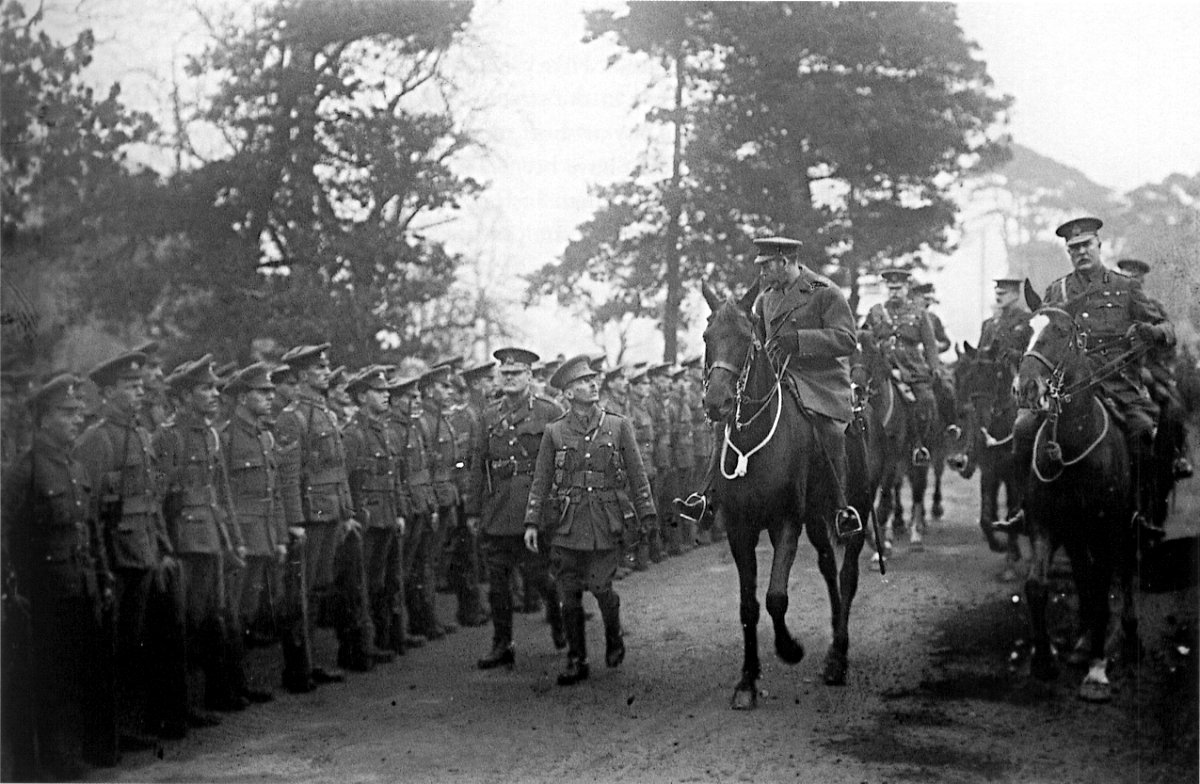
King George V inspecting the 29th Division, British Army, prior to the division's departure for Gallipoli in 1915. The division commander, Major General Aylmer Hunter-Weston, rides alongside the King at the right of the photo.

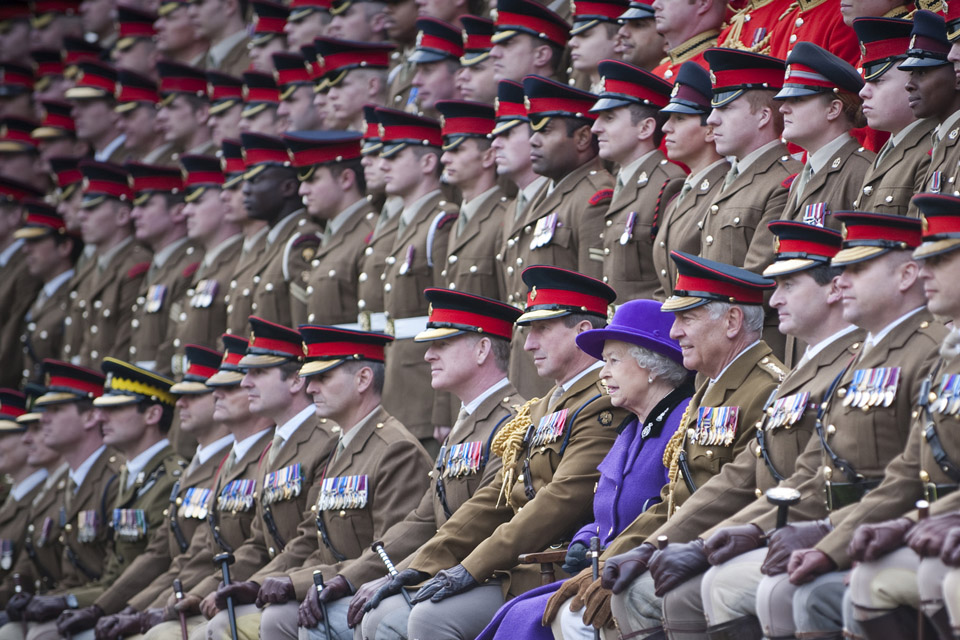
Commander-in-Chief Queen Elizabeth II with members of the Household Cavalry, at Combermere Barracks in 2012.

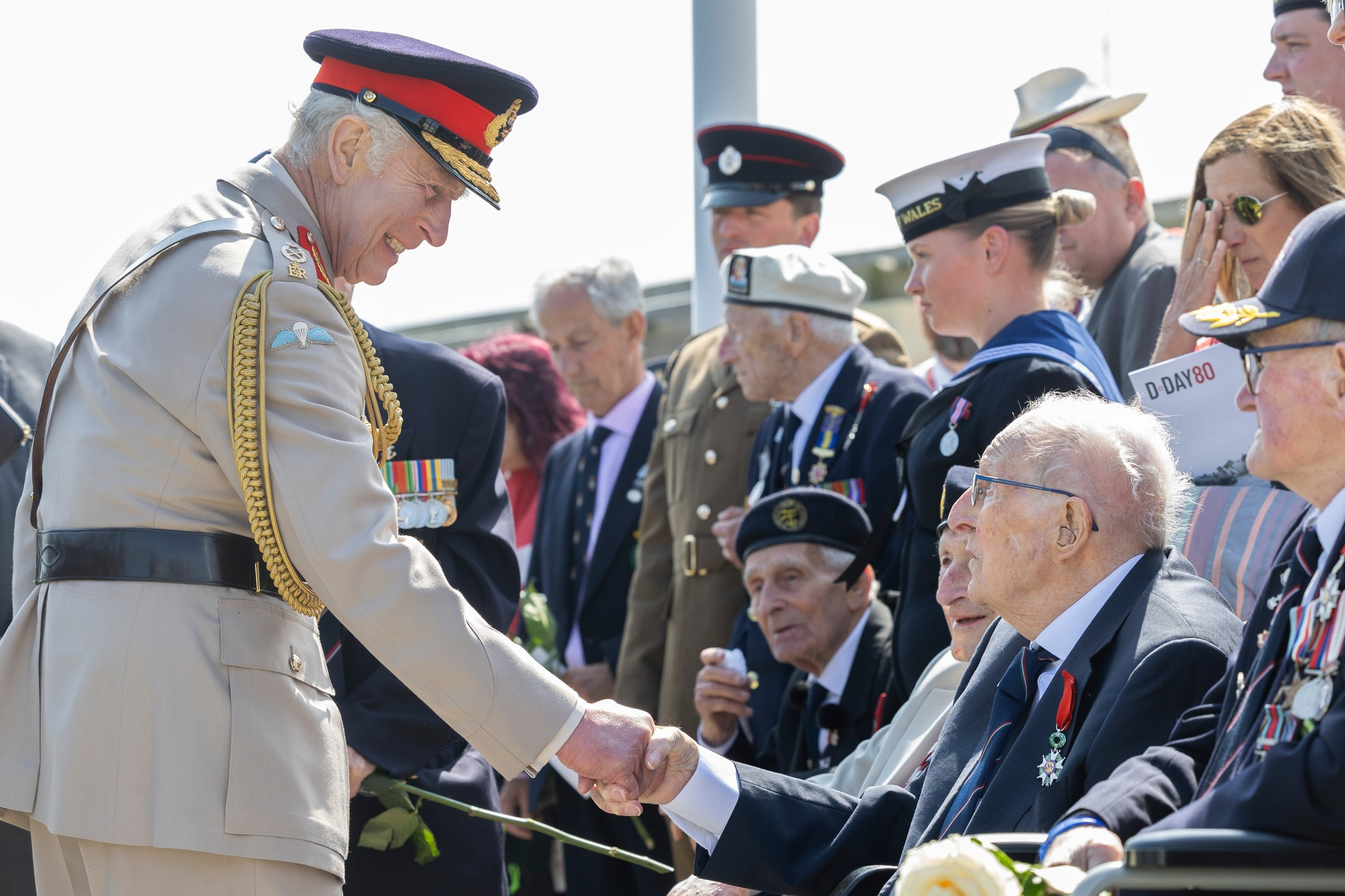
King Charles III greeting veterans at the British Normandy Memorial in Ver-sur-Mer, France, to mark the 80th anniversary of the D-Day landings.

== See also ==
- Commander-in-chief
- Head of the Armed Forces (New Zealand)
- Commander-in-Chief of the Canadian Armed Forces
- Colonel-in-Chief
- British Empire
