= 1743 in art =

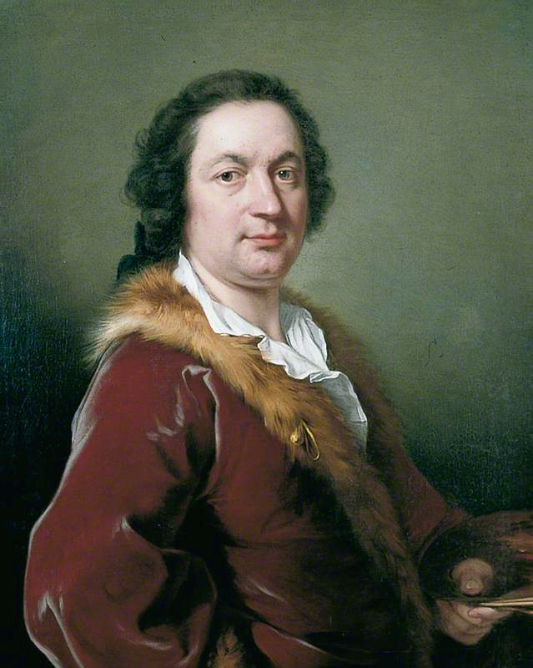
Andrea Soldi

Events from the year 1743 in art.

== Works ==
- Canaletto paints Rome: View of the Colosseum and the Arch of Constantine, The Molo, Looking West, The Piazzetta, Looking North and Capriccio: The Horses of S. Marco in the Piazzetta (now in British Royal Collection)
- Antonio Corradini sculpts The Vestal Virgin Tuccia
- Arthur Devis probably paints Mr and Mrs Atherton
- William Hogarth begins painting his Marriage à-la-mode series
- Andrea Soldi paints a Self-portrait
- Louis-Michel van Loo completes The Family of Philip V
- John Wootton
  - George II at the Battle of Dettingen
  - A View of Henley-on-Thames

== Births ==
- January 3 – Joseph-Benoît Suvée, Flemish painter (died 1807)
- March 5 – Jean-Simon Berthélemy, French history painter (died 1811)
- March 9 – Johann Kaspar Füssli, Swiss painter (died 1786)
- May 2 – William Parry, Welsh portrait painter (died 1791)
- July 24 – Giocondo Albertolli, Swiss-born architect, painter, and sculptor who was active in Italy (d. 1839)
- September 11 – Nikolaj Abraham Abildgaard, Danish Neoclassicist painter (died 1809)
- probable – Louis Jean Desprez, painter and architect (died 1804)
- date unknown
  - Jean-Laurent Mosnier, French painter and miniaturist (died 1808)
  - Erik Westzynthius the Younger, Finnish painter (died 1787)

== Deaths ==
- January 3 – Ferdinando Galli Bibiena, Italian architect/designer/painter and author (born 1656)
- April 20 – Alexandre-François Desportes. French painter and decorative designer who specialised in animal works (b. 1661)
- September 14 – Nicolas Lancret, French painter (born 1690)
- October 9 – Wenzel Lorenz Reiner, Czech Baroque painter (born 1686)
- October 20 – Michael Dahl, Swedish portrait painter (born 1659)
- December
  - Fra Galgario, Bergamese painter, mainly of portraits during the Rococo epoch (born 1655)
  - Giuseppe Ghislandi, Italian painter from Bergamo (born 1655)
- December 27 – Hyacinthe Rigaud, French painter of Catalan origin (born 1659)
- date unknown
  - Giacomo Antonio Arland, Italian painter (born 1668)
  - Antoine Aveline, French engraver (born 1691)
  - Pietro Paolo Cristofari, Italian artist responsible for a number of the mosaics in St. Peter's Basilica (born 1685)
  - Placido Campolo, Italian painter of the late-Baroque period (born 1693)
  - Girolamo Donnini, Italian painter of the Baroque period (born 1681)
  - Antonio Filocamo, Italian painter at various churches and oratories in Messina (born 1669)
  - Sarah Hoadly, English portrait painter (born 1676)
  - Ogata Kenzan, Japanese potter and painter (born 1663)
  - Giovanni Tuccari, Italian painter of battle scenes (born 1667)
