= 1743 in Great Britain =

Events from the year 1743 in the Kingdom of Great Britain.

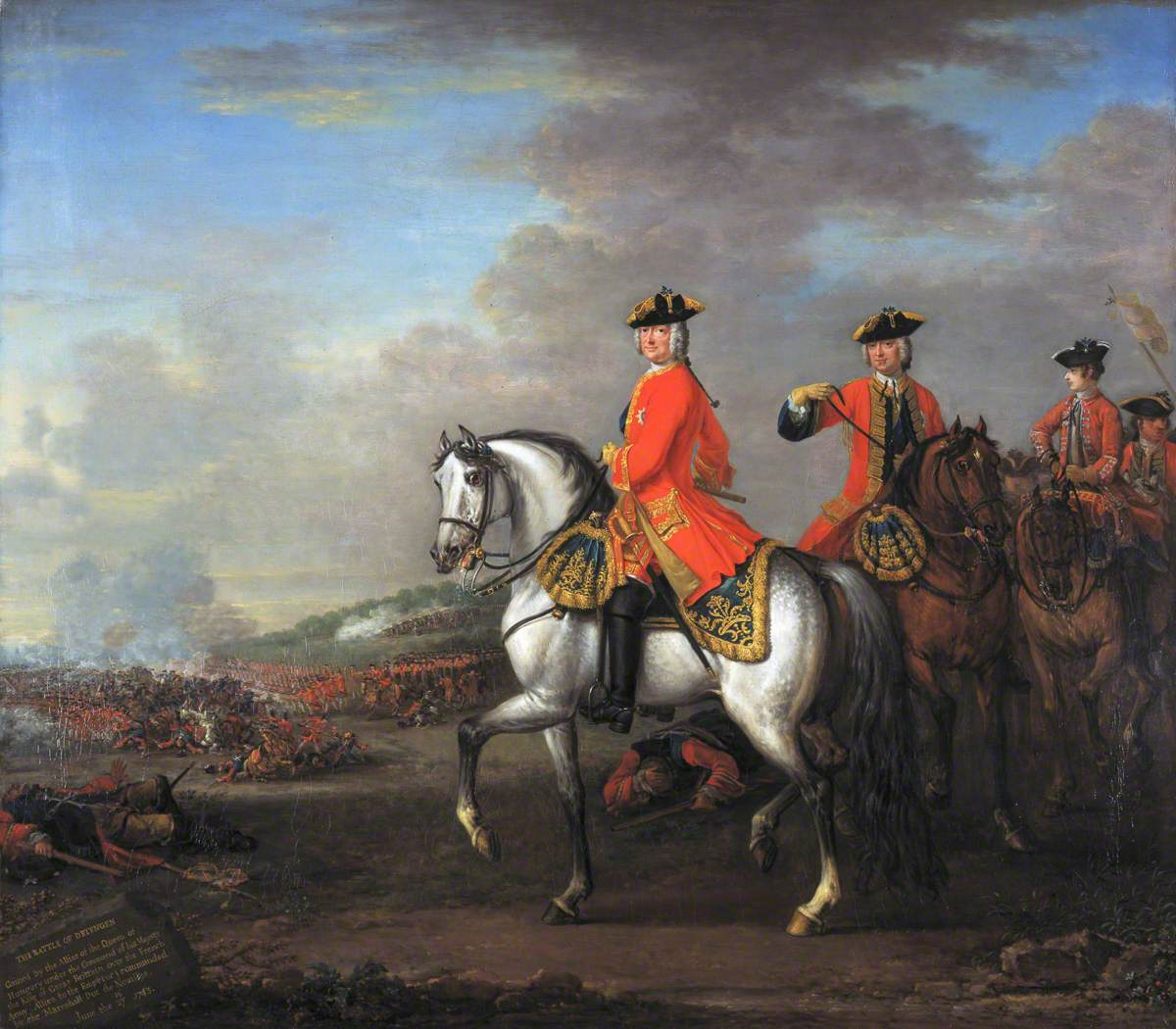
George II at the Battle of Dettingen, 27 June 1743, oil-on-canvas, by John Wootton.

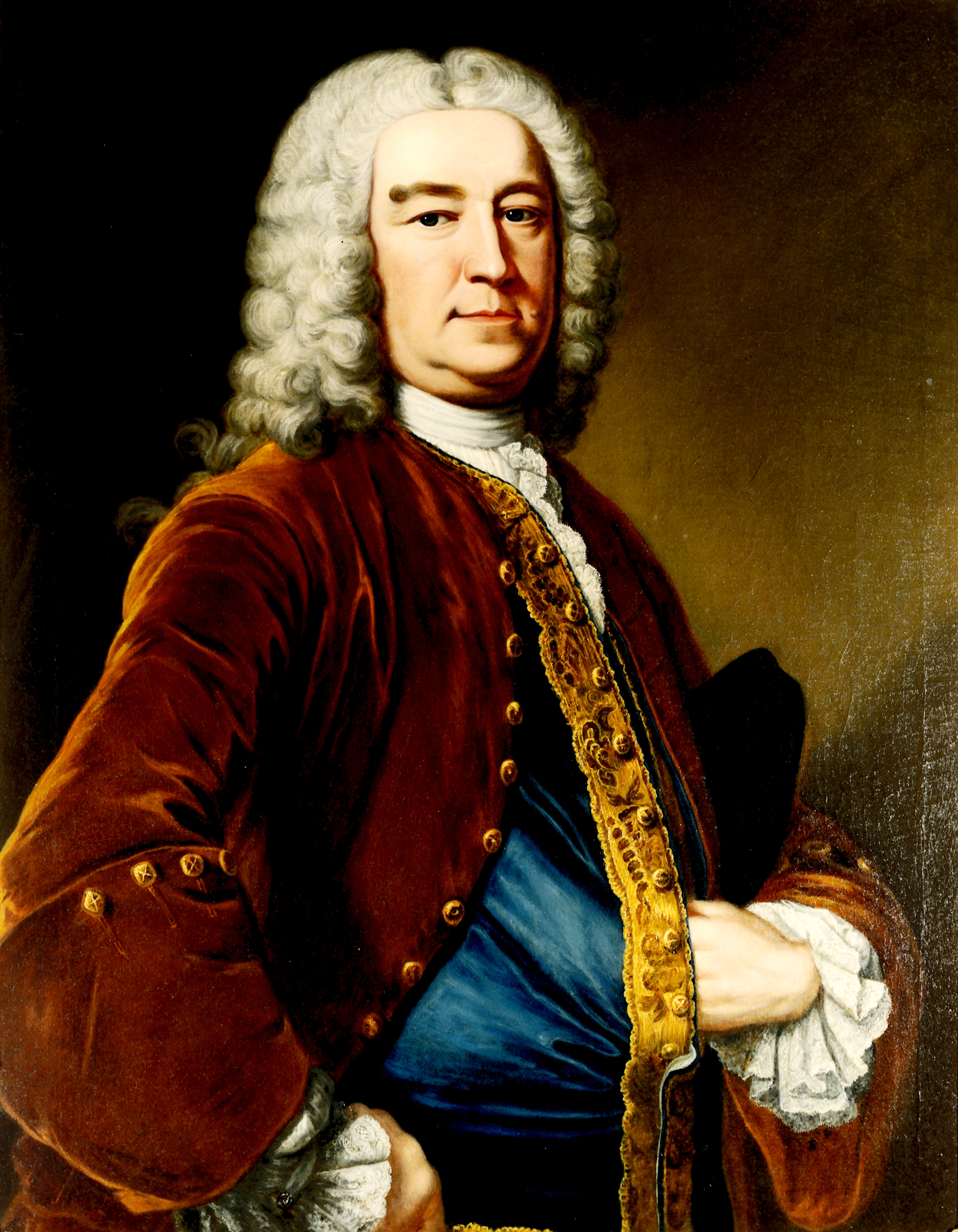
Henry Pelham, second Prime Minister of the Kingdom of Great Britain in 1743, from 27 August.

== Incumbents ==
- Monarch — George II
- Prime Minister:
  - Spencer Compton, 1st Earl of Wilmington (Whig) (until his death on 2 July);
  - Henry Pelham (Whig) (starting 27 August)

== Events ==
=== January to June ===
- 21 February – premiere in London of George Frideric Handel's oratorio, Samson.
- 2 March – War of Jenkins' Ear: Battle of La Guaira – a British expeditionary fleet under Sir Charles Knowles is defeated by the Spanish off the South-American coast.
- 13 April – British East India Company ship Princess Louisa is wrecked off the coast of Maio Island in the Cape Verde Islands, killing 49 of her 179 crew.
- 16 June (27 June New Style) – War of the Austrian Succession: the Battle of Dettingen is fought in Bavaria; King George II leads the troops of Britain and Brunswick to victory over the French – the last time a reigning British monarch participates in a battle. The Prime Minister, Spencer Compton, Earl of Wilmington, is also present, observing from a carriage. George Frideric Handel writes the oratorio Dettingen Te Deum in celebration of the King's victory.

=== July to December ===
- 13 July – all 276 people on board the Dutch East India Company ship Hollandia drown after the ship strikes a rock off Annet, Isles of Scilly.
- 20 July – Lord Anson captures the Philippine galleon Nuestra Señora de Covadonga and its treasure of 1,313,843 Spanish dollars at Manila.
- 27 August – Henry Pelham becomes Prime Minister, following the death of Spencer Compton, Earl of Wilmington, on 2 July.
- 13 September – Treaty of Worms signed between Great Britain, the Holy Roman Emperor, and the Kingdom of Sardinia.
- 25 October – France and Spain form the Alliance of Fontainebleau with the aim of recapturing Gibraltar from Britain.
- 11 December – Princess Louise, the King's daughter, marries Frederick, Crown Prince of Denmark and Norway.

=== Undated ===
- Gin Act 1743 attempts to increase taxation on gin provoking riots in London.
- Dr Christopher Packe produces the first geological map of south-east England.
- Last wolf said to be killed in Scotland.
- William Hogarth begins painting his Marriage à-la-mode series.

== Publications ==
- Robert Blair's poem The Grave is published.
- The final edition of Alexander Pope's The Dunciad is published.

== Births ==
- 1 January – William Parker, admiral (died 1802).
- 13 February – Joseph Banks, naturalist and botanist (died 1820).
- 14 March – Hannah Cowley, dramatist and poet (died 1809).
- 24 April – Edmund Cartwright, clergyman and inventor of the power loom (died 1823).
- July – William Paley, philosopher (died 1805).

== Deaths ==
- 4 April – Daniel Neal, English historian (born 1678).
- 23 May – Thomas Archer, baroque architect (born 1668).
- 2 July – Spencer Compton, 1st Earl of Wilmington, Prime Minister of Great Britain (born 1674).
- 1 August – Richard Savage, writer (born c. 1697).
- 5 August – John Hervey, 2nd Baron Hervey, English statesman and writer (born 1696).
- 23 August – Mary Edwards, heiress (born 1705).
- 4 October – John Campbell, 2nd Duke of Argyll, Scottish soldier (born 1678).
- 5 October – Henry Carey, poet, dramatist and songwriter, suicide (born 1687).

== See also ==
- 1743 in Wales
