= John Dalrymple, 2nd Earl of Stair =

British army officer and diplomat (1673–1747)

Field Marshal The Right Honourable The Earl of Stair KT PC
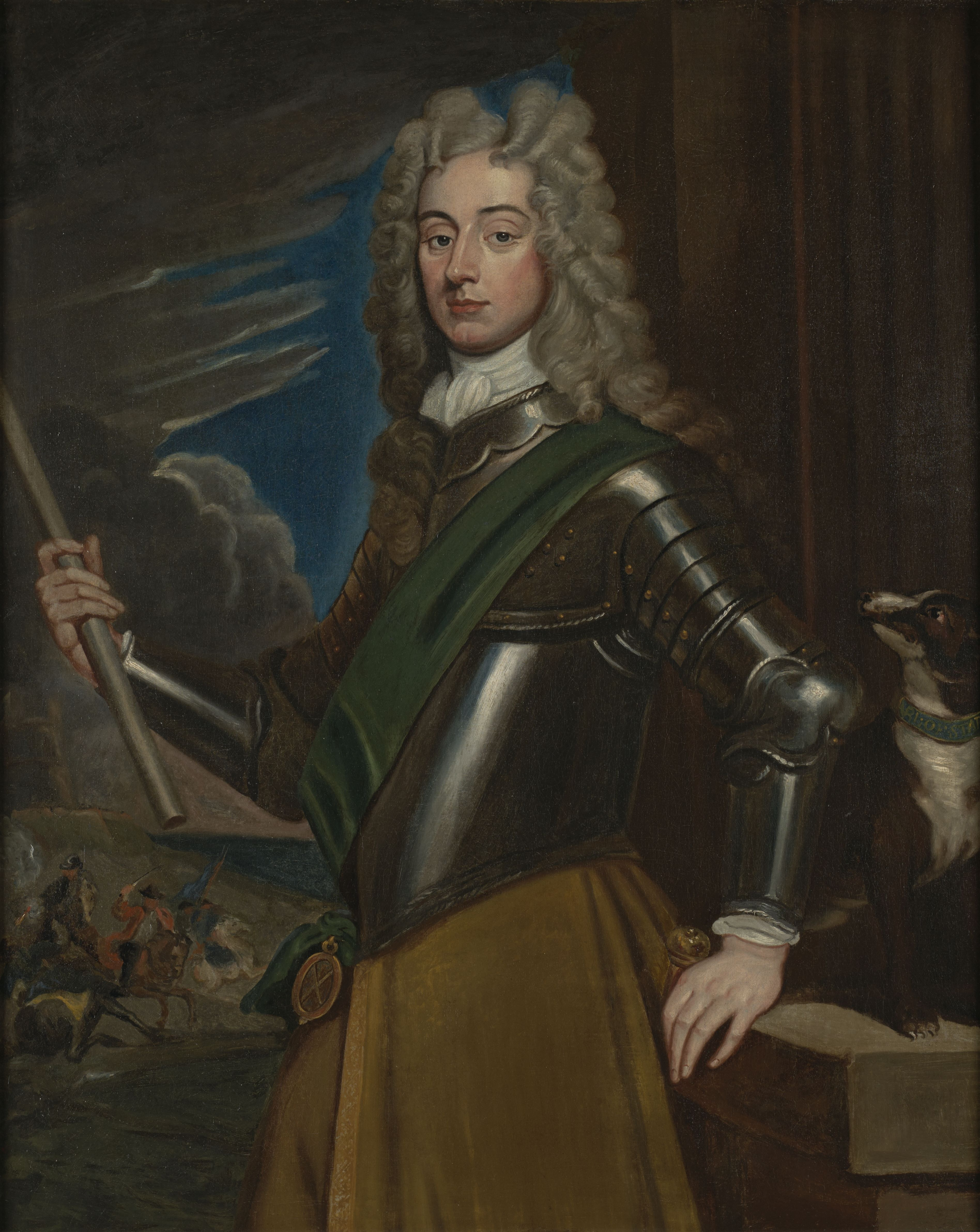
- Portrait, c. 1700
- Born: 20 July 1673; Edinburgh, Scotland
- Died: 9 May 1747 (aged 73); Edinburgh, Scotland
- Military career
- Allegiance: Scotland; Great Britain
- Branch: Scots Army; British Army
- Rank: Field marshal
- Conflicts: Nine Years' War; Battle of Steenkerque; War of the Spanish Succession; Siege of Venlo; Battle of Ramillies; Battle of Oudenarde; Siege of Lille; Battle of Malplaquet; Siege of Douai; Siege of Bouchain; War of the Austrian Succession; Battle of Dettingen; Jacobite rebellion of 1745
- Awards: Knight of the Thistle

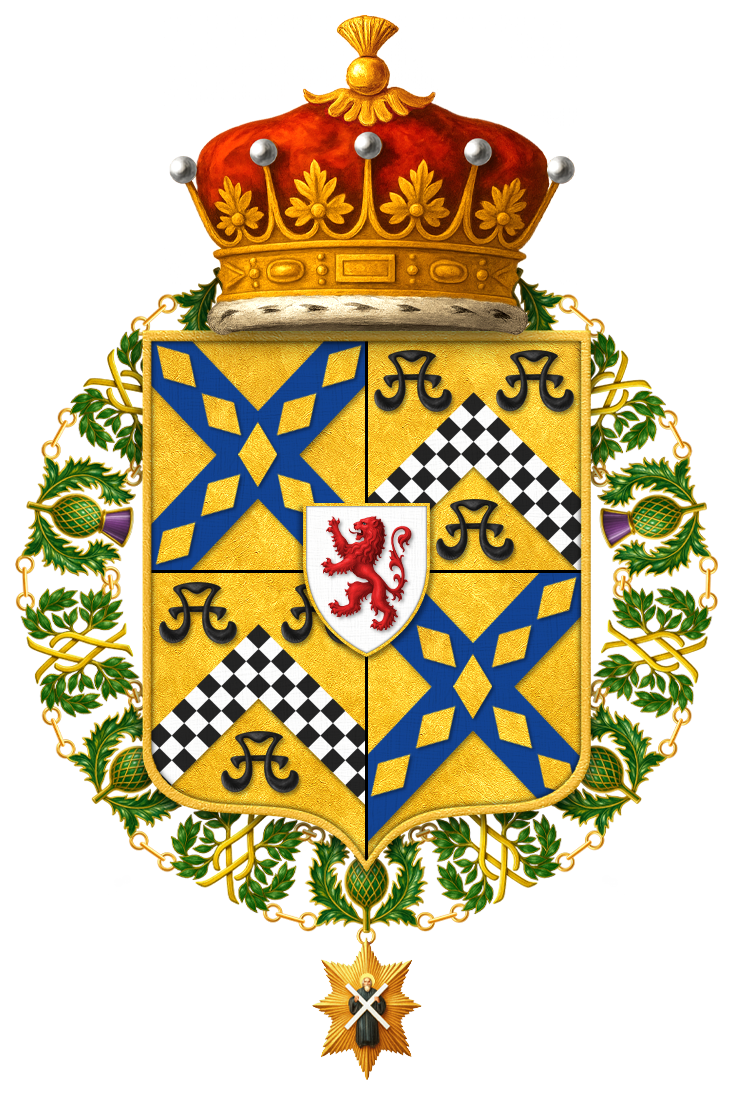
Shield of arms of John Dalrymple, 2nd Earl of Stair, KT, PC

Field Marshal John Dalrymple, 2nd Earl of Stair, KT, PC (20 July 1673 – 9 May 1747) was a British army officer and diplomat who served as the British ambassador to France from 1714 to 1720. He served in the Nine Years' War, War of the Spanish Succession and War of the Austrian Succession.

== Early military career ==
Born the son of John Dalrymple, 2nd Viscount Stair (and later 1st Earl of Stair), and Elizabeth Dalrymple (née Dundas), Dalrymple accidentally killed his brother in a shooting accident in April 1682 and thereafter spent most of his early life in the Netherlands where he studied at Leiden University. He joined up as a volunteer for the Nine Years' War with the Earl of Angus's Regiment and fought at the Battle of Steenkerque in August 1692. At Steenkerque he rallied his regiment several times when the ranks had been broken by cannon fire. In 1695 he became Master of Stair when his father succeeded to the Viscountcy of Stair.

He was commissioned as a lieutenant colonel in the 3rd Foot Guards on 12 May 1702 and fought with John Churchill, 1st Duke of Marlborough, during the War of the Spanish Succession at the Siege of Venlo in September 1702. At Venlo he also saved the life of the Prince of Hesse-Kassel.

He became Viscount Dalrymple in 1703 when his father was created 1st Earl of Stair. In January 1706 he was appointed colonel of the Earl of Angus's Regiment. He commanded a brigade at the Battle of Ramillies in May 1706 and, having been promoted to brigadier general on 1 June 1706, became colonel of the Grey Dragoons on 24 August 1706. He became 2nd Earl of Stair in January 1707 when his father died and later that year he was elected as one of sixteen Scottish representative peers in the newly formed Parliament of Great Britain.

He commanded a brigade at the Battle of Oudenarde in July 1708, the Siege of Lille in Autumn 1708 and then, having been promoted to major general on 1 January 1709, at the Battle of Malplaquet in September 1709. In Winter 1709 the Duke of Marlborough sent him on a diplomatic mission to Augustus II of Poland. He returned in time to take part in the Siege of Douai in April 1710. Promoted to lieutenant general on 1 June 1710, he fought at the Siege of Bouchain in August 1711. He was also appointed a Knight of the Order of the Thistle that year.

He was sent to Flanders to join the military campaign there in April 1712 and became colonel of the Black Dragoons on 9 April 1714.

== Diplomatic service ==
When King George I ascended to the throne in August 1714, Dalrymple was sent as an envoy to the Court of France at Versailles. He was temporarily recalled on 20 November 1714 to take up the appointment of Commander-in-Chief of the Forces in Scotland.

According to the Duc de Saint-Simon, Stair quickly established friendly relations with Philippe II, Duke of Orléans, Regent to the young King Louis XV, paving the way for the Triple Alliance. During his time in Paris, Stair's spies effectively thwarted various "intrigues" by the Jacobites. However, his intemperate hostility to the Scottish financier John Law, whom the Regent had appointed controller of Louis XV's finances, cost him the confidence of British government ministers.

From 1715 to 1720 Stair was based as ambassador at Versailles, where he was greatly inspired by the landscaping.

Stair retired from his position as ambassador in France in June 1720. On his return to Scotland, Stair planted extensively on the Versailles model at his estates at both Newliston House and Castle Kennedy.

In 1729, he became Vice Admiral of Scotland, but lost the position on 5 May 1733, mainly because of his opposition to the Excise Bill of 1733 promoted by Prime Minister Robert Walpole. He was promoted to full general, on the basis of seniority, on 27 October 1735 and also found time to lay out the gardens at Castle Kennedy in the 1730s.

== War of the Austrian Succession ==
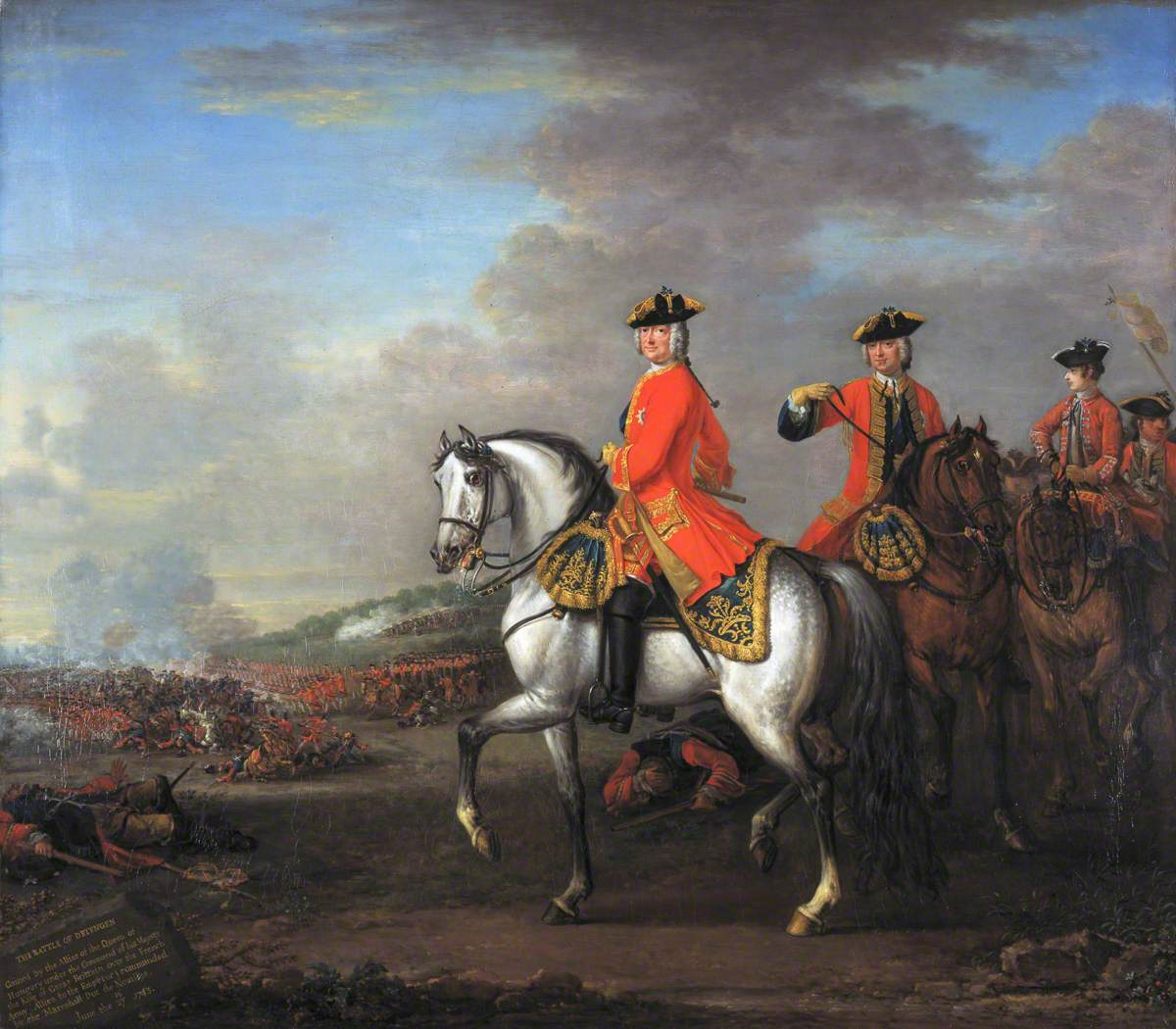
George II at the Battle of Dettingen by John Wootton, 1743. Dalrymple led the allies to victory at Dettingen during the War of the Austrian Succession

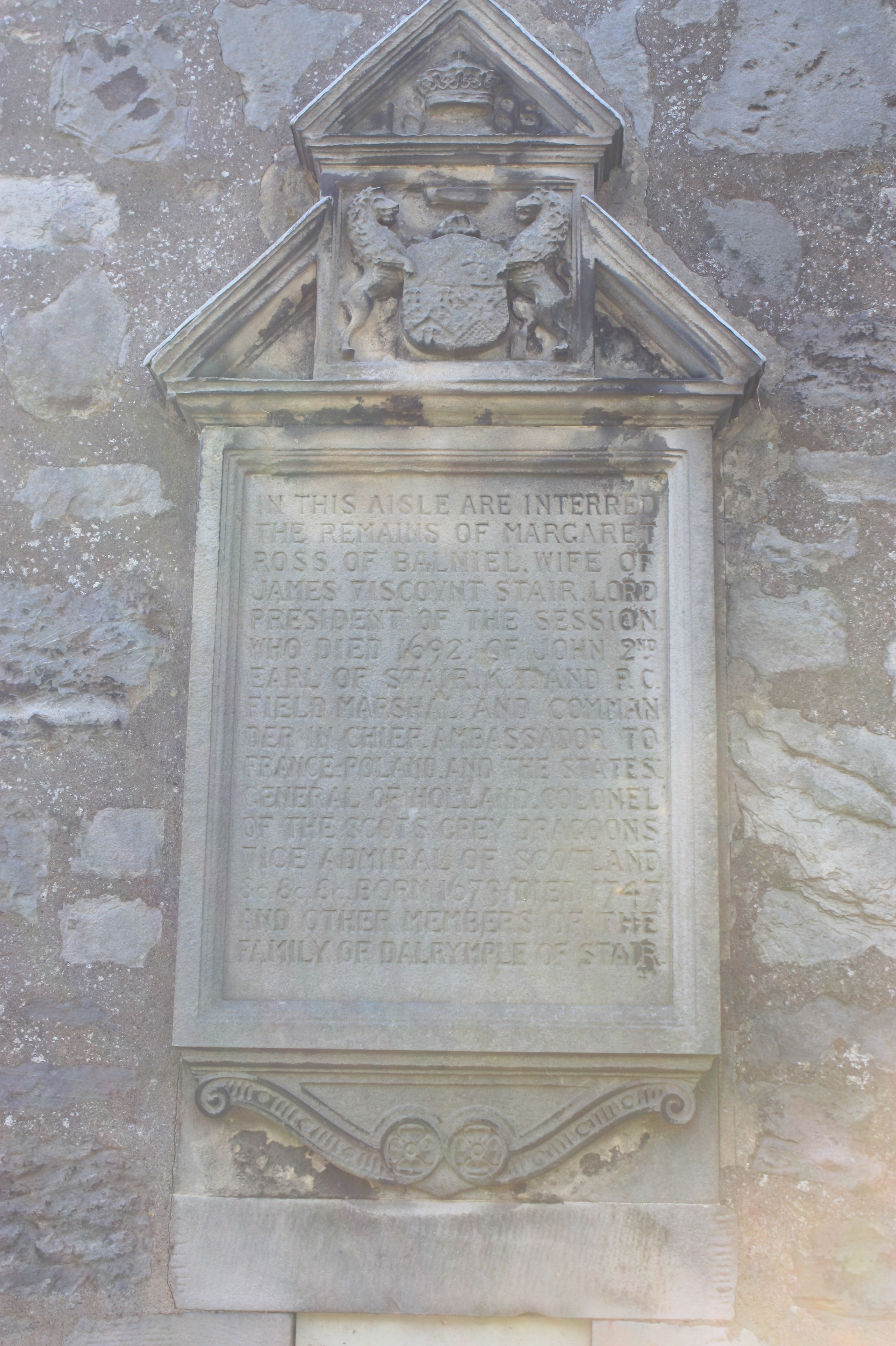
The monument to John Dalrymple, 2nd Earl of Stair, Kirkliston

On 20 March 1742, after Walpole had fallen from office, Dalrymple was promoted to field marshal. On 17 April 1742 he was made Governor of Minorca and on 20 April 1742 took command of the "Pragmatic Army" sent to act with Hanoverian and Austrian forces in support of the Pragmatic Sanction to defend the succession of Maria Theresa to the Austrian monarchy. He was appointed Commander-in-Chief of the Forces in South Britain on 28 February 1743 and colonel of the Black Dragoons again on 30 April 1743 and led the allies to victory at the Battle of Dettingen in June 1743. He retired from command of the army in Flanders at his own request on account of his advancing years in September 1743 and retired as Commander-in-Chief of the Forces to make way for General George Wade in 1745.

On 4 June 1745 he became colonel of the Grey Dragoons and on 14 June 1746 he became General of the Marine Forces. His favourite residence was Newliston near Kirkliston in Linlithgowshire, where he laid out gardens in the French style.

He died on 9 May 1747 at Queensberry House in Edinburgh and was buried in the family vault at Kirkliston.

== Family ==
In March 1708 he married Lady Eleanor Primrose Campbell, daughter of James Campbell, 2nd Earl of Loudoun. She already had four children and they had no children.

Sir Walter Scott's story My Aunt Margaret's Mirror is believed to have been based on efforts made by the Earl of Stair to get Lady Eleanor Primrose Campbell to marry him. Stair wanted his earldom to pass to his nephew John Dalrymple; but on 4 May 1748 the House of Lords ruled that the right to nominate an heir had lapsed, and the earldom passed to the legal heir James Dalrymple, 3rd Earl of Stair.

== Sources ==
- Heathcote, Tony (1999). The British Field Marshals 1736–1997. Pen & Sword Books Ltd. ISBN 0-85052-696-5.
- Memoirs of the Duc de Saint-Simon on the Times of Louis XIV and the Regency. Translated and abridged by Katharine Prescott Wormeley. Boston: Hardy, Pratt. 1902.

Diplomatic posts
Preceded by Matthew Prior	British ambassador to France; 1714–1720	Succeeded by Sir Robert Sutton
Military offices
Preceded by The Earl of Portmore	Viscount Dalrymple's Regiment of Foot; 1703–1706	Succeeded by William Borthwick
Preceded by William Borthwick	Colonel of The Cameronians; 1706	Succeeded by George Preston
Preceded by Lord John Hay	Colonel of the Grey Dragoons; 1706–1714	Succeeded by The Earl of Portmore
Preceded by Robert Echlin	Colonel of the Black Dragoons; 1715–1734	Succeeded by The Lord Cadogan
Preceded by The Duke of Queensberry	Vice Admiral of Scotland; 1729–1733	Succeeded by The Earl of Morton
Preceded by Earl of Hertford	Governor of Minorca; 1742–1747	Succeeded by James O'Hara
Preceded by The Lord Cadogan	Colonel of the Black Dragoons; 1743–1745	Succeeded by The Earl of Rothes
Preceded by Sir James Campbell	Colonel of the Grey Dragoons; 1745–1747	Succeeded by The Earl of Crawford
Vacant Title last held by Duke of Ormonde	Commander-in-Chief of the Forces; 1744	Succeeded by George Wade
Peerage of Scotland
Preceded by John Dalrymple	Earl of Stair; 1707–1747	Succeeded by James Dalrymple
