= Dettingen Te Deum =

Work by George Frideric Handel

- by George Frideric Handel
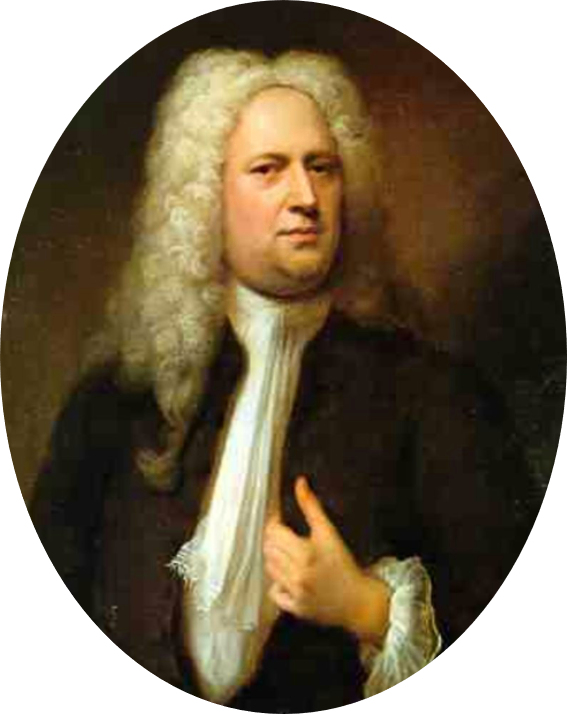
- Portrait of George Frideric Handel by Balthasar Denner, 1733
- Key: D major
- Catalogue: HWV 283
- Year: 1743
- Period: Baroque
- Text: Te Deum
- Language: English
- Performed: 27 November 1743: London
- Movements: 18
- Scoring: SATB choir and soloists, orchestra

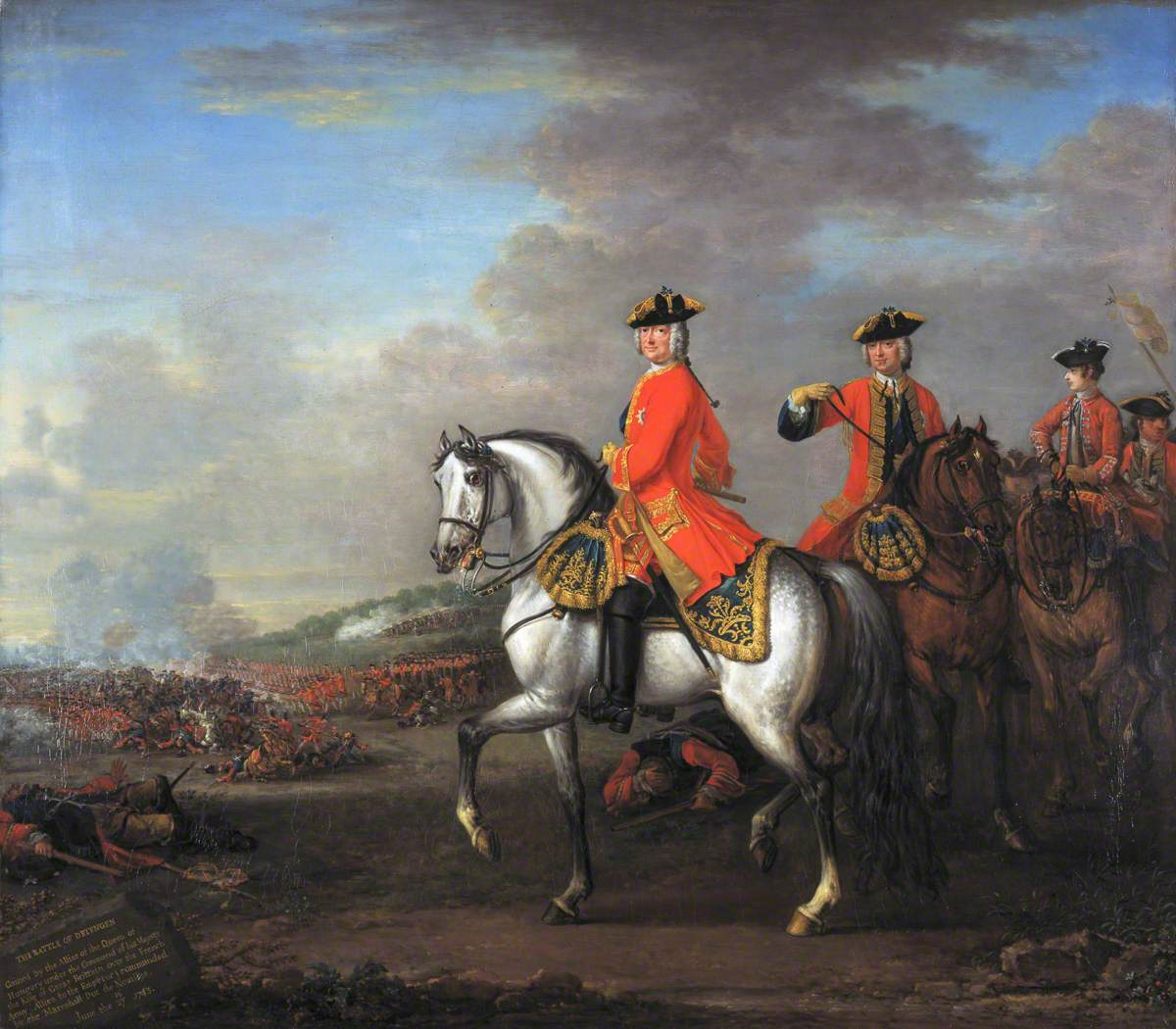
George II at the Battle of Dettingen by John Wootton, 1743

The Te Deum for the Victory at the Battle of Dettingen in D major, HWV 283, is the fifth and last setting by George Frideric Handel of the 4th-century Ambrosian hymn, Te Deum, or We Praise Thee, O God. He wrote it in 1743, only a month after the battle itself, during which Britain and its allies Hannover and Austria soundly routed the French.

== Background ==
On 27 June 1743, the British army and its allies, under the command of King George II and Lord Stair, won a victory at the Battle of Dettingen, over the French army, commanded by the Maréchal de Noailles and the Duc de Grammont. On the King's return a day of public thanksgiving was appointed, and Handel, at that time "Composer of the Musick to the Chapel Royal," was commissioned to write a Te Deum and an anthem ("The King Shall Rejoice") for the occasion. The work was composed between 17 and 29 July 1743 and was first performed on 27 November 1743 in the Chapel Royal of St James's Palace, London in the presence of George II.

== Scoring and structure ==
The work is scored for soloists (alto, tenor and bass), mixed choir in five parts (SSATB), two oboes, bassoon, three trumpets, strings, timpani and basso continuo.

=== Structure ===
1. We praise Thee, O God (Allegro, alto and SSATB)
2. All the earth doth worship Thee (Allegro, alto, tenor and SSATB)
3. To Thee all angels cry aloud (Larghetto e piano, STB)
4. To Thee Cherubin and Seraphim (Andante, SSATB)
5. The glorious company of the apostles (Andante non presto – grave, SATB)
6. Thine honourable, true and only Son (A tempo, SSATB)
7. Thou art the King of glory (Moderato, bass and SSATB)
8. When Thou tookest upon Thee to deliver man (Larghetto e piano, bass)
9. When Thou hadst overcome the sharpness of death (Grave – allegro, SSATB)
10. Thou sittest at the right hand of God (Andante – adagio, alto, tenor and bass)
11. We therefore pray Thee (Largo, SSATB)
12. Make them to be number'd with Thy Saints (Largo, SSATB)
13. Day by day we magnify Thee (Allegro non presto, SSATB)
14. And we worship Thy name (Allegro non presto, SSATB)
15. Vouchsafe, O Lord (Largo e piano, bass)
16. O Lord, in Thee have I trusted (Andante – grave, alto and SSATB)

=== Text ===
We praise Thee O God,
We acknowledge Thee to be the Lord.
All the earth doth worship Thee the Father everlasting.
To Thee all angels cry aloud,
The Heaven and all the powers therein.
To Thee Cherubin and Seraphim continually do cry,
Holy, Holy, Holy, Lord God of Sabaoth.
Heaven and earth are full of the majesty of Thy glory.

The glorious company of the apostles praise Thee,
The goodly fellowship of the prophets praise Thee,
The noble army of martyrs praise Thee,
The holy church throughout all the world doth acknowledge Thee.
The Father of an infinite majesty,
Thine honourable, true and only Son,
Also the Holy Ghost the comforter.

Thou art the King of glory O Christ.
Thou art the everlasting Son of the Father.
When Thou tookest upon Thee to deliver man,
Thou didst not abhor the Virgin's womb.
When thou hadst overcome the sharpness of death,
Thou didst open the kingdom of Heaven to all believers.
Thou sittest at the right hand of God in the glory of the Father.
We believe that Thou shalt come to be our Judge,
We therefore pray Thee: help Thy servants, whom Thou hast redeemed with Thy precious blood.
Make them to be number'd with Thy Saints in glory everlasting.

O Lord, save Thy people, and bless Thine heritage.
Govern them, and lift them up for ever.
Day by day we magnify Thee and we worship Thy name ever, world without end.

Vouchsafe, O Lord, to keep us this day without sin.
O Lord, have mercy upon us.
O Lord, let Thy mercy lighten upon us, as our trust is in Thee.
O Lord, in Thee have I trusted let me never be confounded.

== Musical analysis ==
The Dettingen Te Deum is a grand martial panegyric. It contains eighteen short solos and choruses, mostly of a brilliant, martial character, the solos being divided between the alto, tenor, and bass. After a brief instrumental prelude, the work opens with the triumphant, jubilant chorus with trumpets and drums ("We praise Thee, O God"), written for the five parts, the sopranos being divided into firsts and seconds, containing also a short alto solo leading to a closing fugue.

The second number ("All the earth doth worship Thee") is also an alto solo with five-part chorus of the same general character. It is followed by a semi-chorus in three parts ("To Thee all Angels cry aloud"), plaintive in style, and leading to the full chorus ("To Thee, Cherubin and Seraphim"), which is majestic in its movement and rich in harmony. The fifth number is a quartet and chorus ("The glorious Company of the Apostles praise Thee"), dominated by the bass, with responses from the other parts, and is followed by a short, full chorus ("Thine honourable, true, and only Son"). The seventh number is a stirring bass solo with trumpets. A fanfare of trumpets introduces the next four numbers, all choruses. In this group the art of fugue and counterpoint is splendidly illustrated, but never to the sacrifice of brilliant effect, which is also heightened by the trumpets in the accompaniments. An impressive bass solo ("Vouchsafe, O Lord") intervenes, and then the trumpets sound the stately symphony to the final chorus ("O Lord, in Thee have I trusted"). It begins with a long alto solo with delicate oboe accompaniment that makes the effect very impressive when voices and instruments take up the phrase in a magnificent outburst of power and rich harmony, and carry it to the close.

== Recordings ==
- Handel: Dettingen Te Deum, Dettingen Anthem - Choir of Westminster Abbey, The English Concert, Simon Preston (conductor), 1984, Deutsche Grammophon: Archiv 410 6472
- Handel: Dettingen Te Deum - Choir of Trinity College, Cambridge, Academy of Ancient Music, Stephen Layton (conductor), 2008, Hyperion Records: CDA67678
- Händel: The Choice of Hercules; Dettingen Te Deum - Christ Church Cathedral Choir, FestspielOrchester Göttingen, Laurence Cummings (conductor), 2018, Accent Records: ACC 26415

== Sources ==
- Upton, George P., The Standard Oratorios: Their Stories, Their Music, and Their Composers, Chicago: A. C. McClurg & Co. 1893, pp. 155–158
