= Eleanor Dalrymple =

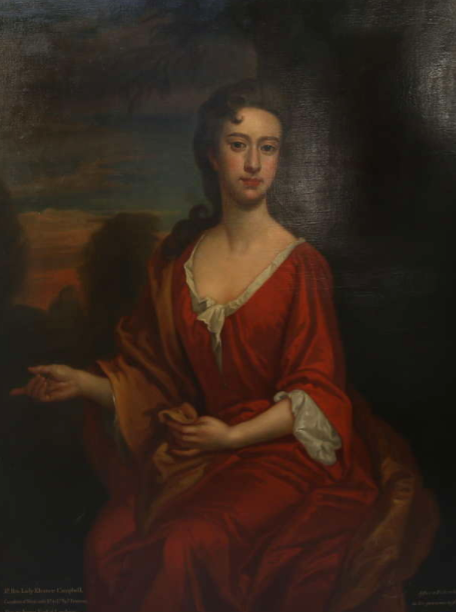
- "after Godfrey Kneller"
- Born: Eleanor Campbell
- Died: 21 November 1759
- Other names: Eleanor, Countess of Stair
- Known for: a story of premonition
- Spouse: Sir James Primrose (later Viscount Primrose)
- Children: 4

Eleanor Dalrymple, Countess of Stair born Lady, Eleanor Campbell aka Eleanor, Lady Primrose ( – 21 November 1759) was a British victim of marital abuse. She is said to be the basis for a story by Sir Walter Scott. Lady Stair's Close in Edinburgh is said to be named for her, but another source says it was named for her mother-in-law.

== Life ==
Her birth date and place are unknown but she was the last child of seven born to Lady Margaret Montgomerie and James Campbell, second earl of Loudoun (d. 1684). Her parents owned land and she had a home education. In June 1697, she married Sir James Primrose, a landowner and member of parliament. They had four children.

She found her husband cruel and she eventually deserted him and went to live with her mother after she said that she thought he intended to use a sword on her. He went abroad and while he was away she visited a fortune teller. During the session, she said she saw a vision of her brother interrupting a marriage where her husband was getting married. This was so strange that she wrote it down. This alleged premonition was proven when her brother returned from abroad and he confirmed that he had prevented her husband from committing bigamy. Dalrymple's premonition was said to be corroborated by her earlier written account that she was able to present which described her visit to the fortune teller. This story is said to be the basis of a story by Sir Walter Scott, "My Aunt Margaret's Mirror" which was one of The Keepsake Stories.

In 1703 her estranged husband became Viscount of Primrose and in 1706 she became a widow and according to another story she intended to stay that way. She was said to have refused to marry John Dalrymple, 2nd Earl of Stair, so he broke into her house so that neighbours could see him through her bedroom window. According to the story she was obliged to marry him to explain the strange man in her bedroom.

Her problems continued and according to reports her new husband was in the habit of being drunk and violent. One story says that one evening her husband hit her and her face bled. She slept that night without looking after the wound. Her husband was so shocked in the morning that he vowed to only take a drink in future if it was with his wife's approval.

They lived at Castle Kennedy in Wigtownshire and at Newliston in Linlithgowshire. John died in 1747 and she lived on to 1759.

Lady Stair's Close in Edinburgh is said to be named for her, but another source says that the close is named for Lady Stair's House which in turn was owned by the Dowager of the first Earl of Stair (her mother-in-law).
