= The Keepsake Stories =

"The Keepsake Stories" is the title given to three short stories by Sir Walter Scott which appeared in The Keepsake for MDCCCXXIX, a literary annual published for Christmas 1828. The short stories were entitled "My Aunt Margaret's Mirror", "The Tapestried Chamber, or The Lady in the Sacque", and "Death of the Laird's Jock".

Charles Heath had originally planned for Scott to become the editor of the annual, offering him £800. Scott refused but accepted £500 for these three stories, which had been intended for Scott's collection Chronicles of the Canongate, but had already been rejected by its editor Robert Cadell. The annual also included Scott's "Description of the Engraving Entitled A Scene at Abbotsford".

== My Aunt Margaret's Mirror ==
=== Plot summary ===
Sir Philip, who had married for money and quarrelled with his brother-in-law, determined on the declaration of war in 1702 to join the Duke of Marlborough's army in Flanders as a volunteer. Receiving no tidings of him for many months, Lady Jemima resolved to consult a doctor from Padua, who had the reputation of being able to show his visitors their absent friends, and what they were doing. Accordingly, she and her sister, disguised as soldiers' wives, went to him secretly, when he at once told them their real names and the information they desired. Having enjoined absolute silence, and changed his dress to that of an eastern necromancer, he led them into a room hung with black and lighted with torches, containing a large mirror behind an altar, on which were two swords, an open book, and a human skull. Gradually the mirror ceased to reflect these objects, and they saw the interior of a foreign church, in which Sir Philip was about to be married to a beautiful girl, when a group of officers entered, one of whom advanced towards the bridal party, and swords were drawn on both sides. The scene then vanished, and the mirror again reflected the contents of the room. Restoratives were now offered to the ladies, and they were conducted to their carriage, the professor handing Lady Bothwell a composing draught for her sister.

A few days afterwards news arrived from Holland that Sir Philip's nuptials with the daughter of a rich burgo-master were actually about to be celebrated, when Major Falconer, who happened to be in the town, and had come with some brother officers to witness the ceremony as an amusement, recognised and denounced the would-be bigamist, accepted a challenge from him, and was killed. Lady Jemima never recovered from the shock, the Italian disappeared to escape arrest as a Jacobite, and Sir Philip having, in his old age, sought in vain a reconciliation with Lady Bothwell, eluded pursuit as a murderer and died abroad.

=== Basis ===
The basis for the story above is thought to be the life of Eleanor, Countess of Stair who died in 1759.

=== Characters ===
- Sir Philip Forester
- Lady Jemima, his wife
- Lady Bothwell, his wife's sister
- Major Falconer, their brother
- Baptista Damiotti, a Paduan doctor

== The Tapestried Chamber ==
=== Plot summary ===
This is a ghost story. While travelling through the western counties, the general's attention was attracted by a picturesquely situated old castle, and, on inquiry at the inn where he changed horses, he learnt that its owner was a nobleman who had been his schoolfellow. He accordingly determined to call upon his lordship; and, having been persuaded to be his guest for a week, he was conducted at bedtime to an old-fashioned room, hung with tapestry, but comfortably furnished, and well lighted by two large candles and a blazing fire. The next morning Lord Woodville was informed by his servant that the general had been wandering in the park since an early hour and when he appeared at the breakfast table his countenance was haggard, his clothes carelessly put on, and his manner abstracted; moreover, he announced that he must depart immediately. Drawing him aside from the other visitors, his host pressed him for an explanation, and, after declaring that he would rather face a battery than recall the events of the night, he reluctantly narrated what he had undergone.

Just as he was falling asleep he heard the rustling of a silk gown, and the tapping of high-heeled shoes, and then the figure of a woman passed between the bedstead and the fireplace. At first her back was towards him, but she slowly turned, and he distinctly saw the features of a corpse, bearing traces of the most hideous passions. He started up, and she sat on the bed, advancing her face within half a yard of his, upon which all his courage forsook him and he swooned. On recovering his senses she had disappeared, but he was afraid to move until daybreak, when he hurried from the room thoroughly unnerved. Lord Woodville was deeply impressed, for the chamber had the reputation of being haunted; and as he conducted the general through his picture gallery, he suddenly started as he caught sight of a portrait, exclaiming, "There she is!" and it proved to be the likeness of an ancestress whose crimes were incest and murder.

=== Characters ===
- General Browne, returned from the American war
- The landlord of an inn
- Lord Woodville, of Woodville Castle
- The apparition of a woman

== Death of the Laird's Jock ==
=== Plot summary ===
Armstrong had been known during his father's lifetime as the Laird's Jock, or son; and being possessed of great strength and courage, had distinguished himself in the use of a two-handed sword, bequeathed to him by a Saxon outlaw, in many of the single combats which took place between the English and Scottish borderers during the reign of Queen Elizabeth.

He had, however, grown old, and was bed-ridden, when his only son accepted the challenge of an English champion. But his heart swelled with joy at the news, and having entrusted the lad with his celebrated weapon, he insisted on being wrapped in plaids and carried to the spot selected for the encounter, attended by his daughter. His followers gazed sadly on their chieftain's withered features and shrunken form; but when the combatants met, and the Englishman brandished the sword over his fallen antagonist, the old laird, reanimated for an instant with his former vigour, sprang from the rock on which he was seated, and, having uttered a cry like that of a dying lion rather than a human being, sank into the arms of his clansmen broken-hearted, not at the death of his boy, but at their wounded honour, and the irreparable loss of his weapon.

=== Characters ===
- John Armstrong, the Laird of Mangertown
- His son
- His daughter
- Foster, an English champion

== A Scene at Abbotsford ==
The Keepsake for MDCCCXXIX contains a fourth prose work by Scott, pp. 258–61, which is listed in the Table of Contents as "A Scene at Abbotsford"; "Author of Waverley". The same title appears in the List of Plates — four column headings: Subjects, Painters, Engravers, Page — "A Scene at Abbotsford"; "R. Landseer, A.R.A."; "D. Smith"; "258".

The plate "Scene at Abbotsford." (with dot, no definite article) faces page 258, where the work by Scott begins under this two-part three-line heading (all caps with the third line small caps, viewed at Google Books):

Description of the Engraving Entitled
A Scene at Abbotsford.
By the author of Waverley.

Some coverage of The Keepsake in contemporary newspapers implies that the illustrations, usually about 20 engravings reproduced as plates, are the main feature of the annual gift book, or the only reason to pay its high price. According to the "Description", the scene features a venerable wolf hound owned in its retirement by Sir Walter Scott; set in the owner's apartment, with a deer hound and two hawks provided by the painter Mr. Landseer.

== Sources ==
- Paula R Feldman. Introduction to the re-edition of The Keepsake for 1829. Broadview Press, 2006.
- The Keepsake for MDCCCXXIX. Google Books. Full interior view with text search. Catalogued as "The Keepsake: 1829".

This article incorporates text from the revised 1898 edition of Henry Grey's A Key to the Waverley Novels (1880), now in the public domain.
