= A View of Henley-on-Thames =

Painting by John Wootton

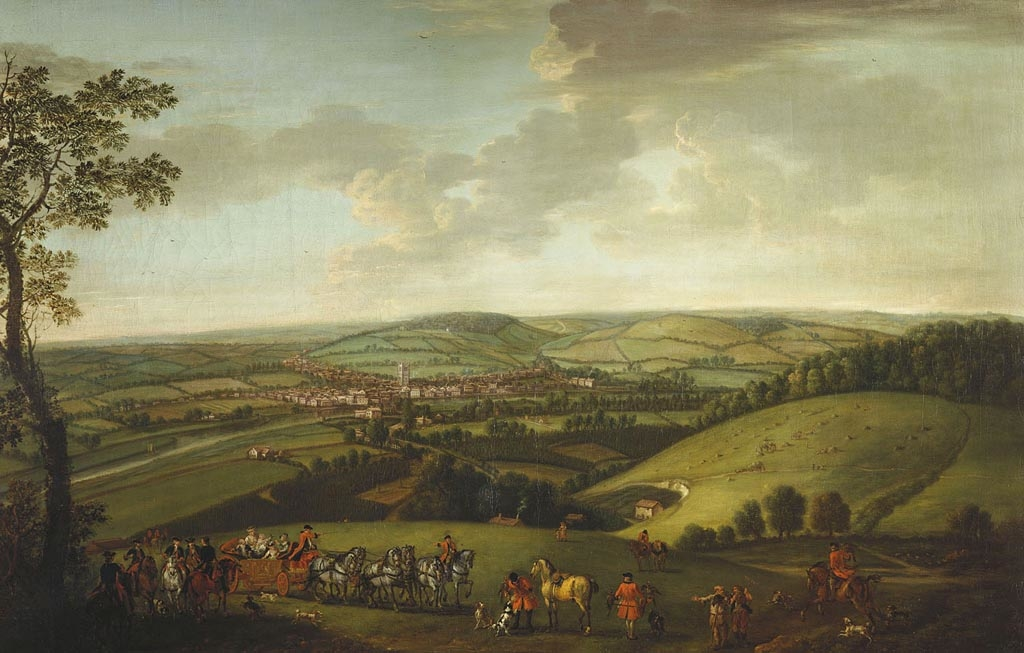
- Artist: John Wootton
- Year: c.1743
- Type: Oil on canvas, landscape painting
- Dimensions: 260 cm × 400 cm (101 in × 156 in)
- Location: Royal Collection

A View of Henley-on-Thames is a c.1743 landscape painting by the British artist John Wootton. It depicts a view of Henley-on-Thames in Oxfordshire. In 1738 Frederick, Prince of Wales, the son of George II and heir to the throne, acquired the country estate of Park Place. Frederick commissioned Wootton to paint several panoramic views of the house and surrounding countryside. This painting is looking away from the house towards the town of Henley and the River Thames. In the foreground is a carriage and men and women on horseback including Frederick himself. Wootton was a pioneering British animal painter who received a number of royal commissions. The painting remains in the Royal Collection today.

== Bibliography ==
- Lloyd, Christopher. The Royal Collection: A Thematic Exploration of the Paintings in the Collection of Her Majesty the Queen. Sinclair-Stevenson, 1992.
- Meyer, Arline. John Wootton, 1682-1764: Landscapes and Sporting Art in Early Georgian England. Greater London Council, 1984.
