= Battle of Dettingen =

1743 battle of the War of Austrian Succession

- Part of War of the Austrian Succession
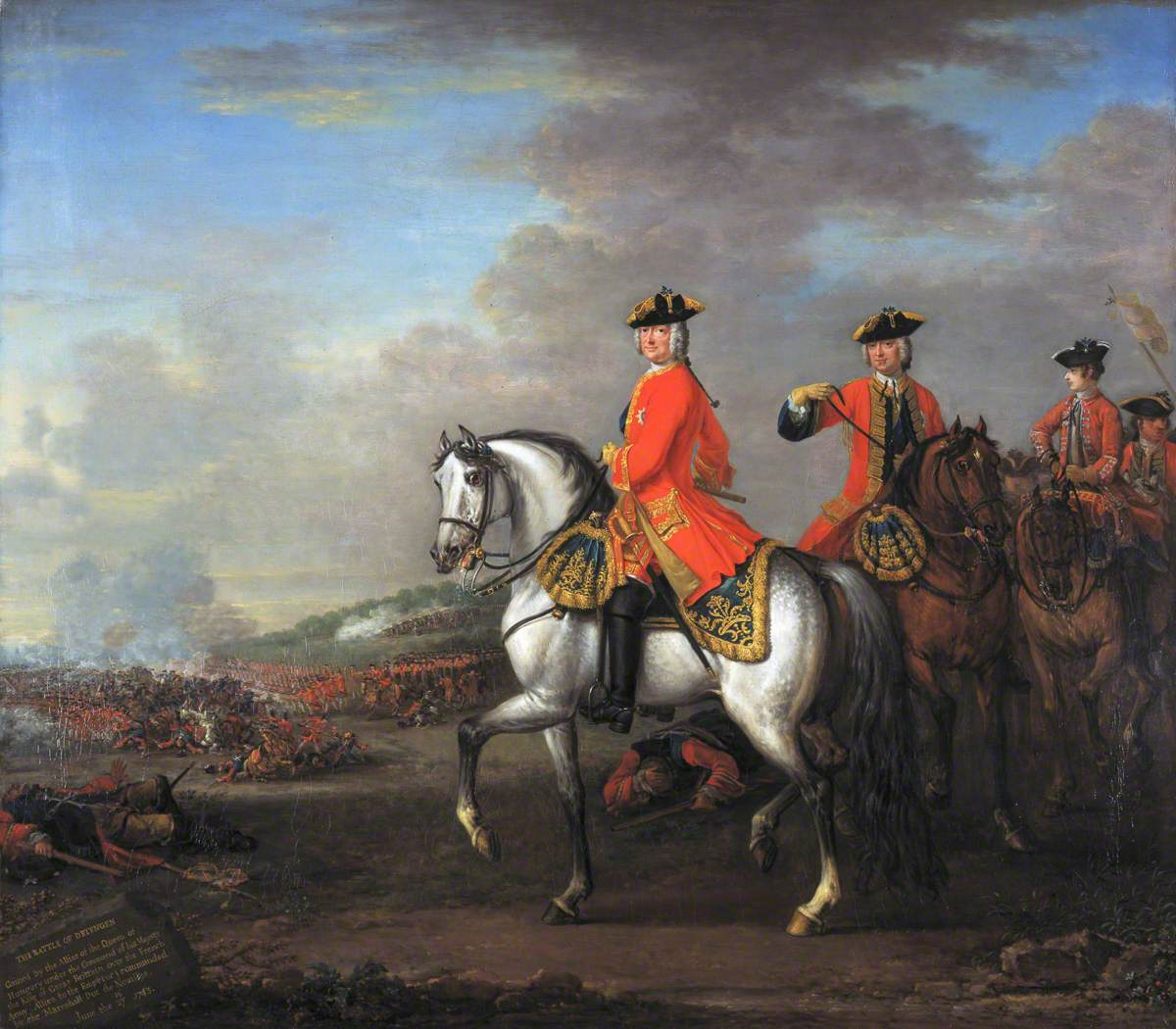
- George II at the Battle of Dettingen (1743)
Date	27 June 1743
Location	Karlstein am Main, Bavaria 50°2′26″N 9°2′10″E
Result	Allied victory

Belligerents
Great Britain; (Electorate of Brunswick-Lüneburg) Hanover; Austria	France

Commanders and leaders
George II; Earl of Stair; Duke of Arenberg; von Neipperg; Johann Georg von Ilten	Duke of Noailles; Duke of Gramont; Duke of Harcourt

Strength
35,000	23,000

Casualties and losses
2,332 (Note: Other estimates suggest between 2,000 and 3,000)	3,000–4,500 (Note: Hesse State Archive Marburg 21 WHK Wilhelmshöher Kriegskarten Bd. 21: Österreichischer Erbfolgekrieg 1740–1748 bis zum Aachener Frieden Relation S3, gives a total of 4,104 killed or wounded. A German document gives somewhat higher totals for the artillery and cavalry; many drowned when a bridge collapsed, and 'missing' are not included)

The Battle of Dettingen (Note: German: Schlacht bei Dettingen) took place on 27 June 1743 during the War of the Austrian Succession, near Karlstein am Main in Bavaria. An alliance composed of British, Hanoverian and Austrian troops, known as the Pragmatic Army, (Note: Supporters of the Pragmatic Sanction of 1713 were generally known as the Pragmatic Allies) defeated a French force commanded by the Duke of Noailles. While the Earl of Stair exercised operational control, the Allies were nominally commanded by George II of Great Britain, and Dettingen was the last time a reigning British monarch led troops in combat. The battle had little impact on the wider war, and has been described as 'a happy escape, rather than a great victory.'

== Background ==
The immediate cause of the War of the Austrian Succession was the death in 1740 of Emperor Charles VI, last male Habsburg in the direct line, leaving his eldest daughter, Maria Theresa, as heir to the Habsburg monarchy. (Note: Often referred to as 'Austria', this included Austria, Hungary, Croatia, Bohemia and the Austrian Netherlands) Because Salic law did not normally allow women to inherit, the Imperial Diet passed the Pragmatic Sanction of 1713, allowing the Hapsburg crowns to pass to Maria Theresa. After Charles’ death, the legality of the Pragmatic Sanction was challenged by Charles Albert of Bavaria, the closest male-line heir.

This dynastic dispute became a Europe-wide issue, because the Austrian monarchy was the most powerful single element in the Holy Roman Empire. A federation of mostly German states, the Empire was headed by the Holy Roman Emperor, in theory an elected position, but held by the Habsburgs since 1440. In January 1742, Charles of Bavaria became the first non-Habsburg emperor in 300 years, with the support of France, Prussia and Saxony. Austria and Maria Theresa were backed by the Pragmatic Allies, Britain, Hanover and the Dutch Republic.

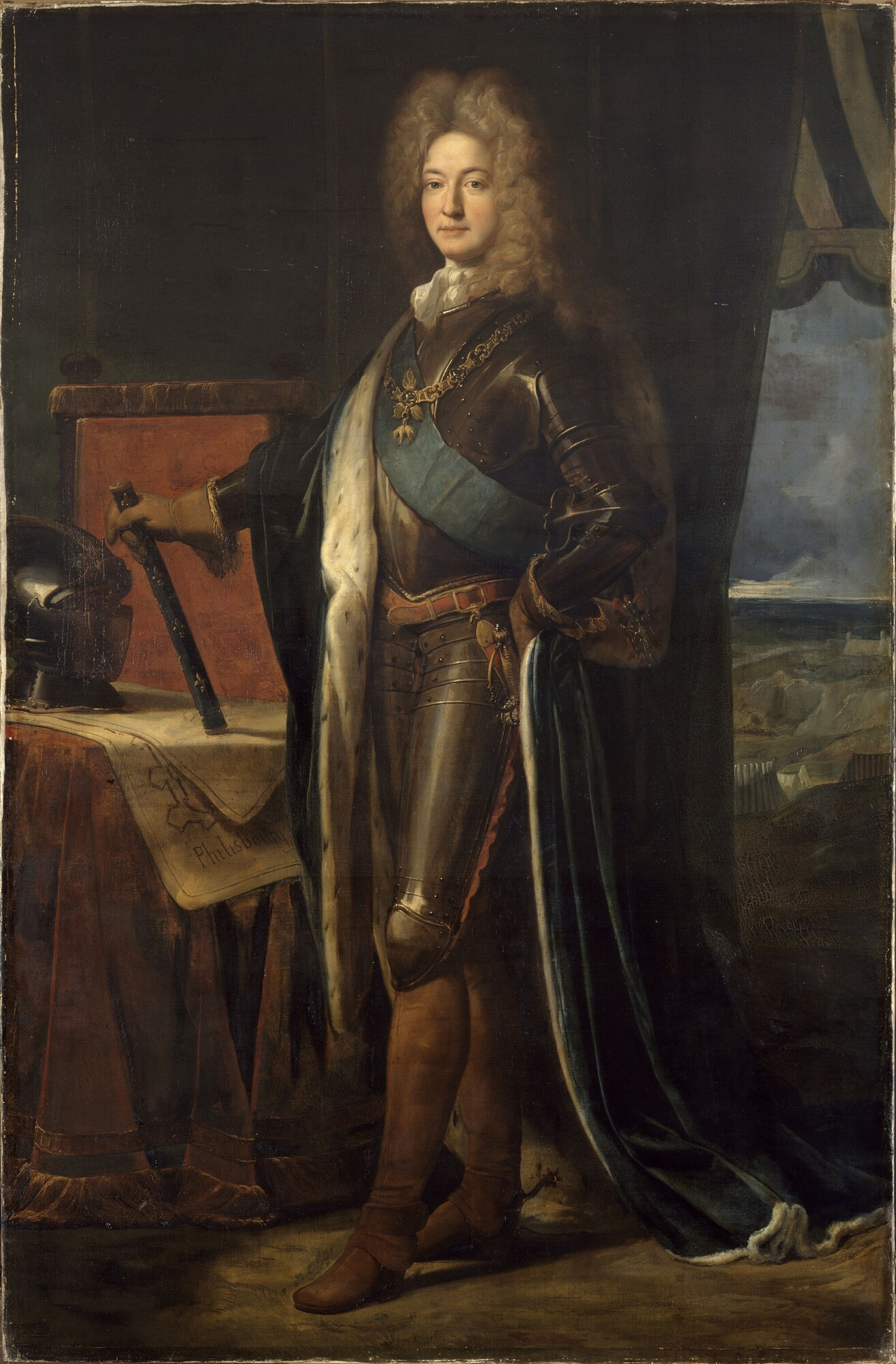
French commander de Noailles

In December 1740, Prussia invaded Silesia, a wealthy Austrian province that produced 10% of the total imperial income. This was followed by France, Saxony and Bavaria occupying Bohemia, while Spain also joined the war, hoping to regain possessions in Northern Italy lost in 1713. To relieve the pressure, in early 1742 Britain agreed to send a naval squadron to the Mediterranean and 17,000 troops to the Austrian Netherlands, under the John Dalrymple, 2nd Earl of Stair.

However, in June 1742 Austria made peace with Prussia by the Treaty of Breslau. This freed up Pragmatic Alliance resources for a campaign in Bavaria, most of which had been occupied by December, while the French armies were devastated by disease. The focus of the 1743 campaign switched to Germany; the Austrians defeated the Bavarians at Simbach and in mid-June, the Allied army arrived at Aschaffenburg, on the north bank of the river Main. Here they were joined by King George II, who had been attending the coronation of a new elector of Mainz. By late June, the Allies were short of supplies and withdrew towards their nearest supply depot at Hanau. The road ran through Dettingen, where the French commander, Adrien Maurice de Noailles, Duke of Noailles, had positioned 23,000 troops under his nephew, Louis de Gramont, Duke of Gramont.

== Battle ==
The Battle of Dettingen; key locations. Note river line (in blue)

Around 1:00 am on 27 June, the Allies left Aschaffenburg in three columns and marched along the north bank of the Main, heading for Hanau. The French position at Dettingen was extremely strong; De Gramont's infantry held a line anchored on the village and running to the Spessart Heights, with the cavalry on level ground to their left. Noailles instructed Florent-Jean de Vallière to place his guns on the south bank of the Main, which allowed them to fire on the Allied left.

Inadequate reconnaissance due to poorly led cavalry was a problem for the Allies throughout the war, and the French presence in Dettingen took them by surprise. When Noailles sent another 12,000 troops over the Main at Aschaffenburg, into the Allied rear, he had high hopes of destroying their entire army. Ilton, commander of the Allied infantry, ordered the British and Hanoverian Foot Guards back to Aschaffenburg, while the remainder changed from column of march into four lines to attack the French position. As they did so, they were fired on by the French artillery, although this caused relatively few casualties.

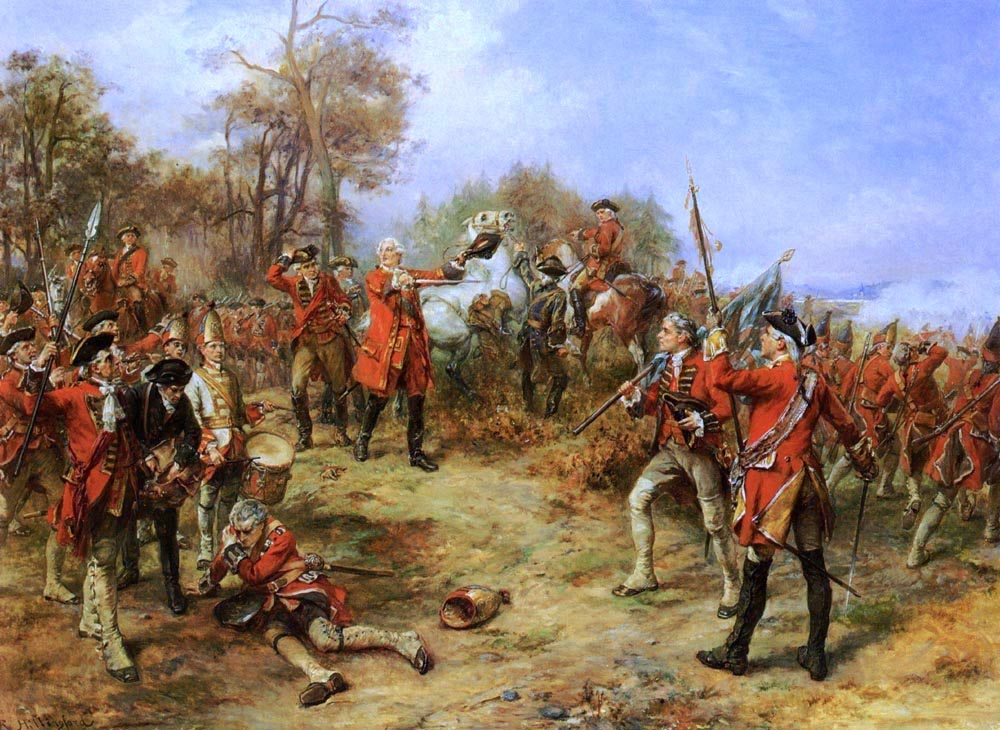
George II at Dettingen (Robert Alexander Hillingford, 1902)

Despite being ordered three times by Noailles to hold their position, around midday the elite Maison du Roi cavalry charged the Allied lines. Who initiated it is disputed, de Gramont being the most common choice. French historian De Périni suggests the Maison de Roi, who had not seen action since Malplaquet in 1709, saw an opportunity to win the battle on their own and, led by the duc d'Harcourt, broke through the first three lines, throwing the inexperienced British cavalry into confusion.

They were followed by the Gardes Françaises infantry, in a disjointed and piecemeal attack which forced de Vallière to cease fire for fear of hitting his own troops, allowing the British infantry in the fourth line to hold their ground. A Hanoverian artillery battery began firing at close range into the French infantry, while an Austrian brigade took them in the flank. After three hours of fighting, the French retreated to the left bank of the Main, most of their casualties occurring when one of the bridges collapsed.

== Aftermath ==
Although George II handed out numerous promotions and rewards, Dettingen is generally viewed as a lucky escape. The Pragmatic Army continued towards Hanau. Although it has been suggested that they could have exploited their victory, they were in no shape to attempt a contested river crossing. Forced to withdraw due to lack of supplies, the Allied army escaped but had to abandon their wounded in order to move faster, and might have suffered a serious defeat if Noailles' orders had been followed.

The Allied cavalry performed woefully, failing to locate 23,000 men across their line of retreat, less than 13 km (8 mi) away, while many troopers were allegedly unable to control their horses. Only the infantry's training and discipline saved the army from destruction, and one of the training companies at the Royal Military Academy Sandhurst is named 'Dettingen' in recognition of this fact.

On 30 September, the Allies were reinforced by 14,000 Dutch troops under Count Nassau-Ouwekerk. However, as the French withdrawal had temporarily removed any threat to Hanover, George II decided to end the campaign, against Stair's advice. They then took up winter quarters in the Netherlands.

Noailles was appointed French Foreign Minister in early 1744, while de Gramont was killed at Fontenoy in 1745. The 70 year old Stair retired, and was replaced by the equally elderly George Wade.

In honour of the battle, and his patron George II, Handel composed the Dettingen Te Deum and Dettingen Anthem.

== Sources ==
- Anderson, MS (1995). The War of the Austrian Succession 1740–1748. Routledge. ISBN 978-0582059504.
- Armour, Ian (2012). A History of Eastern Europe 1740–1918. Bloomsbury Academic Press. ISBN 978-1-849-66488-2.
- "Battle of Dettingen". British Battles.
- Black, Jeremy (1999). From Louis XIV to Napoleon: The Fate of a Great Power. Routledge. ISBN 978-1857289343.
- Browning, Reed (1995). The War of the Austrian Succession. Griffin. ISBN 978-0312125615.
- Brumwell, Stephen (2006). Paths of Glory: The Life and Death of General James Wolfe. Hambledon Continuum. ISBN 978-1852855536.
- Chandler, David (1990). The Art of Warfare in the Age of Marlborough. Spellmount Limited. ISBN 0-946771-42-1.
- Clodfelter, M. (2017). Warfare and Armed Conflicts: A Statistical Encyclopedia of Casualty and Other Figures, 1492–2015 (4th ed.). Jefferson, North Carolina: McFarland. ISBN 978-0-7864-7470-7.
- De Périni, Hardÿ (1896). Batailles françaises; Volume VI. Ernest Flammarion, Paris.
- Duffy, Christopher (1987). Military Experience in the Age of Reason (2016 ed.). Routledge. ISBN 978-1138995864.
- Grant, R G (2017), 1001 Battles That Changed the Course of History, Chartwell Books, ISBN 978-0785835530
- Hamilton, Richard (1874). Origin and History of the First, or Grenadier Guards, Volume II. HMSO.
- "Handel Dettingen Te Deum; Te Deum in A". Gramophone.co.uk.
- Harding, Richard (2013). The Emergence of Britain's Global Naval Supremacy: The War of 1739–1748. Boydell Press. ISBN 978-1843838234.
- Lecky, WEH (1878). A history of England in the Eighteenth century; Volume I.
- Mackinnon, Colonel Daniel (1883). Origin and Services of the Coldstream Guards: Volume I. Richard Bentley.
- McNally, Michael (2020). Dettingen 1743: Miracle on the Main. Bloomsbury Publishing. ISBN 9781472836816.
- Mallinson, Allan (2009). The Making of the British Army. Bantam Press. ISBN 978-0593051085.
- Morris, Edward Ellis (1886). The Early Hanoverians. Charles Scribner & Sons.
- Périni, Hardÿ de (1896). Batailles françaises; Volume VI. Ernest Flammarion, Paris.
- Townshend, Charles Vere Ferrers (1901). The Military Life of Field-Marshal George First Marquess Townshend, 1724–1807: Who Took Part in the Battles of Dettingen 1743, Fontenoy 1745, Culloden ... from Family Documents Not Hitherto Published. John Murray.
- "Vallière, Joseph-Florent de". kronoskaf.com.
- Zwitzer, H. L. (2012). Hoffenaar, J.; Van der Spek, C. W. (eds.). Het Staatse Leger: Deel IX De Achtiende Eeuw 1713–1795 (The Dutch States Army: Part IX The Eighteenth Century 1713–1795) (in Dutch). De Bataafsche Leeuw.
