= George II at the Battle of Dettingen =

1743 painting by John Wootton

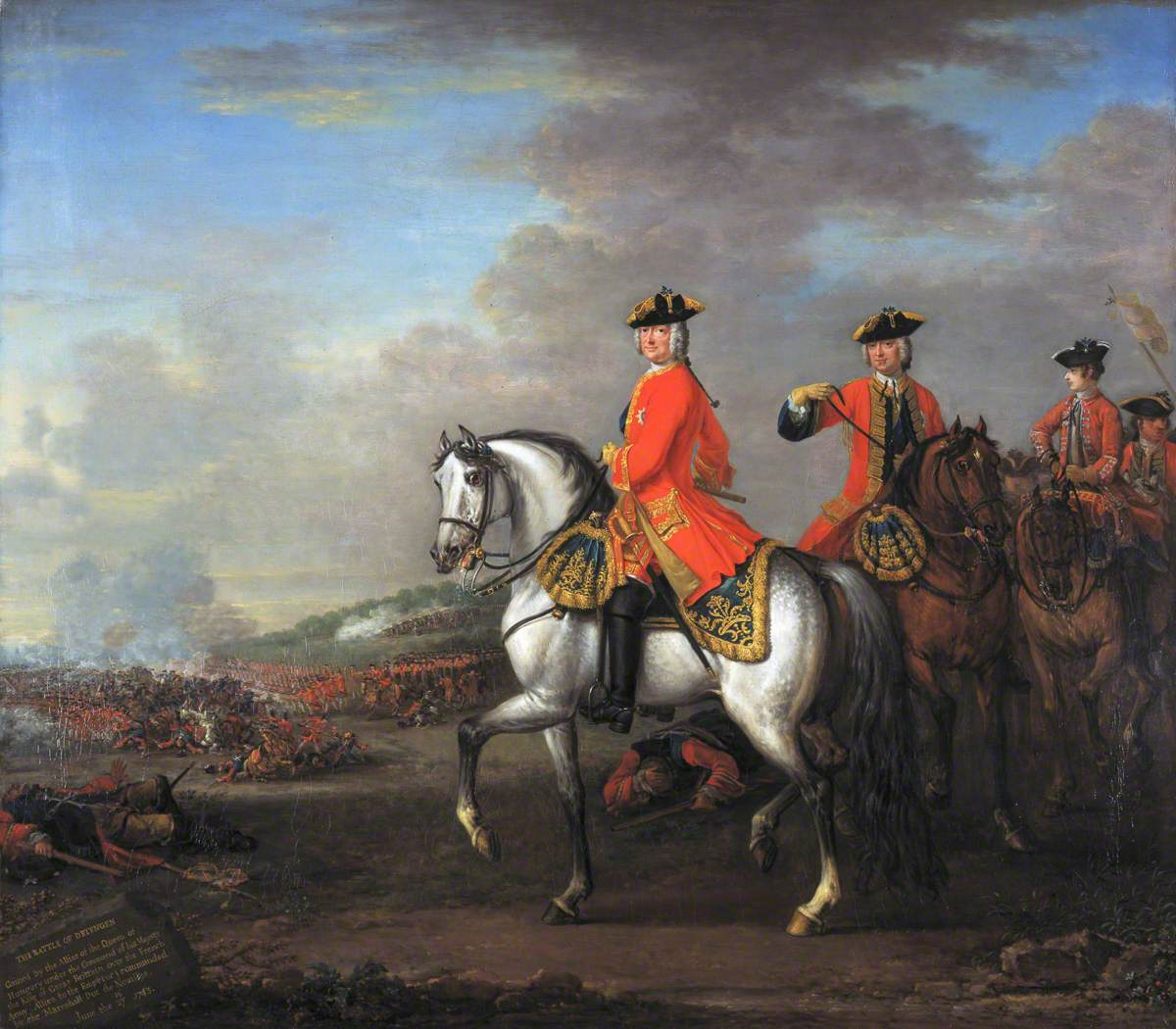
- Artist: John Wootton
- Year: 1743
- Type: Oil on canvas, history painting
- Dimensions: 370 cm × 415 cm (145.8 in × 163.3 in)
- Location: National Army Museum, London

George II at the Battle of Dettingen is a 1743 history painting by the English artist John Wootton. It depicts George II of Great Britain at the Battle of Dettingen. Fought in Bavaria in June 1743 during the War of the Austrian Succession, the battle was a victory for the Pragmatic Army. George was the last British monarch to lead troops on the battlefield. He is shown on horseback along with his son the Duke of Cumberland and the Earl of Holderness. The painting is now in the collection of the National Army Museum in London, having been acquired in 1961

== Bibliography ==
- Brewer, John. The Pleasures of the Imagination: English Culture in the Eighteenth Century. Routledge, 2013.
- Thompson, Andrew C. George II: King and Elector. Yale University Press, 2011.
