= John Wootton =

English painter (c. 1686 – 1764)

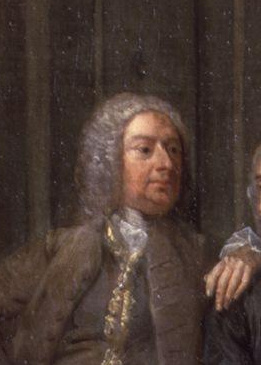
- Portrait by Gawen Hamilton, 1735
- Born: c. 1686; Snitterfield, Warwickshire, England
- Died: 13 November 1764 (aged 77–78); London, England
- Known for: Painting

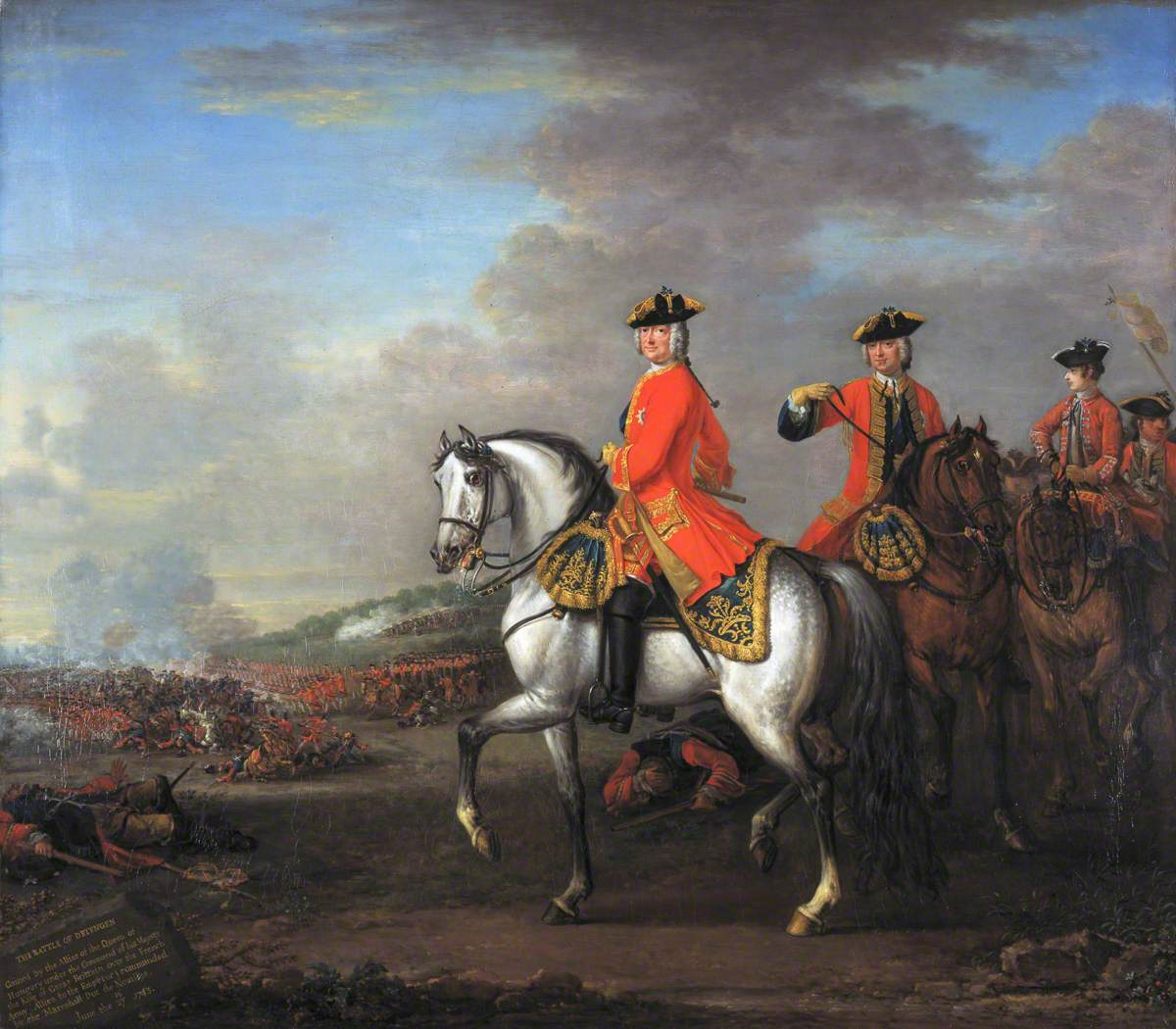
George II at the Battle of Dettingen, 1743

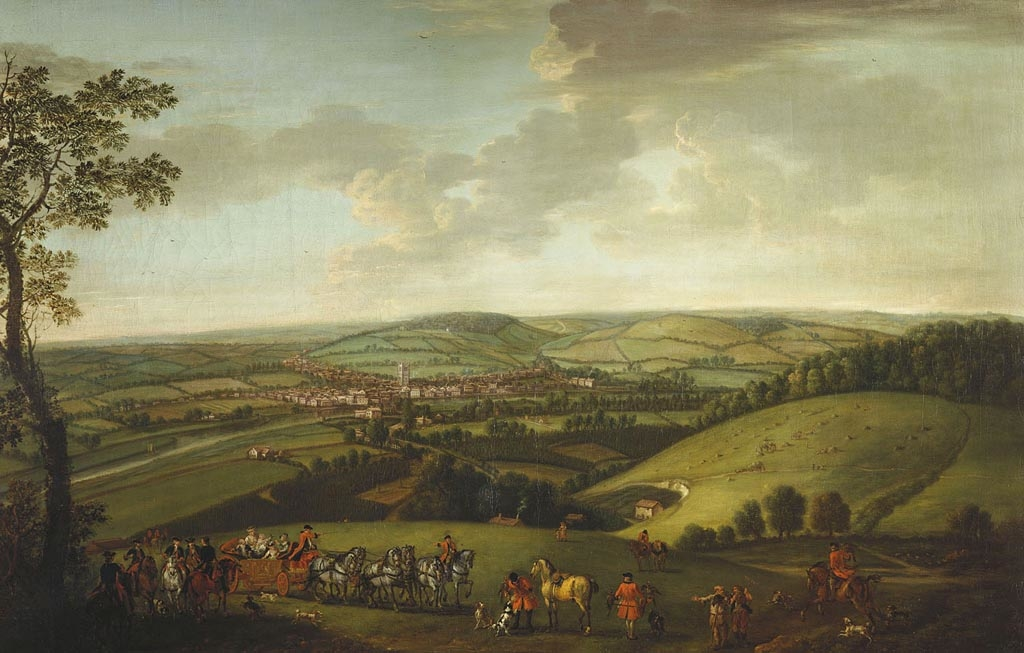
A View of Henley-on-Thames, 1743

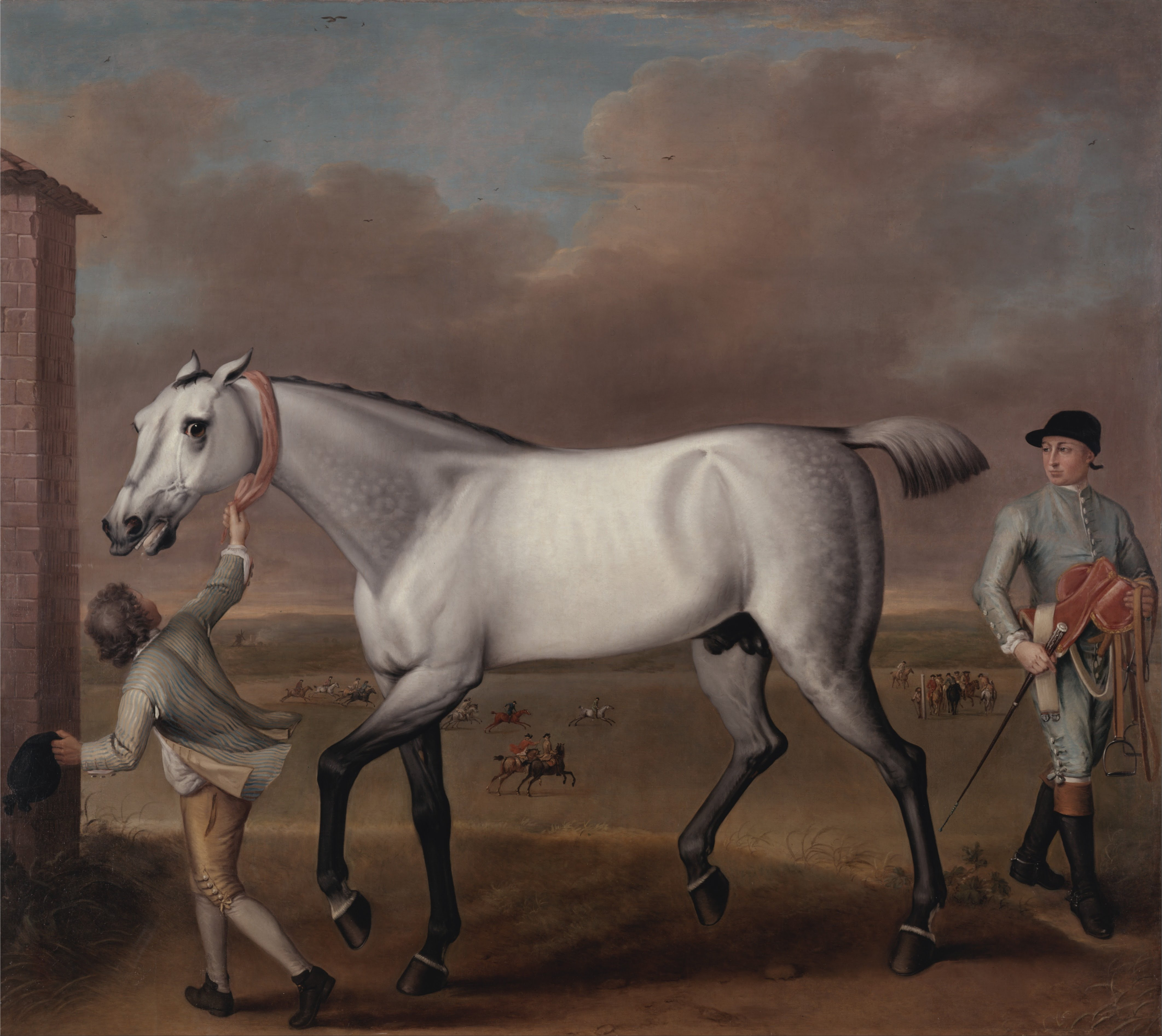
The Duke of Hamilton's Grey Racehorse, 'Victorious,' at Newmarket, c. 1725

John Wootton (c. 1686 – 13 November 1764) was an English painter of sporting subjects, battle scenes and landscapes, and illustrator.

== Life ==
Born in Snitterfield, Warwickshire (near Stratford-upon-Avon), he is best remembered as a pioneer in the painting of sporting subjects – together with Peter Tillemans and James Seymour – and was considered the finest practitioner of the genre in his day. As such, his paintings were very fashionable and were sought after by those among the highest strata of the British society. These included figures such as George II of Great Britain, Frederick, Prince of Wales, and the Duke of Marlborough.

It is likely that he received artistic training from Jan Wyck before 1700. Wootton may have begun life as a page to the family of the Dukes of Beaufort. His earliest surviving dated work is the equine portrait Bonny Black (1711). He remained active until his death in 1764, based in the capital of English horse racing at Newmarket, and producing large numbers of portraits of horses and also conversation pieces with a hunting or riding setting. He acquired a classicising landscape style based on that of Gaspard Dughet, which he used in some pure landscape paintings, as well as views of country houses and equine subjects. This introduced an alternative to the various Dutch and Flemish artists who had previously set the prevailing landscape style in Britain, and through intermediary artists such as George Lambert, the first British painter to base a career on landscape subjects, was to greatly influence other British artists such as Gainsborough.

He is now somewhat eclipsed in the field of animal paintings by the later George Stubbs (1724–1806), who is considered technically superior. John Wootton died in London on 13 November 1764. Examples of his animal painting can be found in the Tate Gallery, London, the Virginia Museum of Fine Arts, Richmond, the Yale Center for British Art, in the Elizabethan Great Hall at Longleat and in The Portland Collection at the Harley Gallery and Foundation.

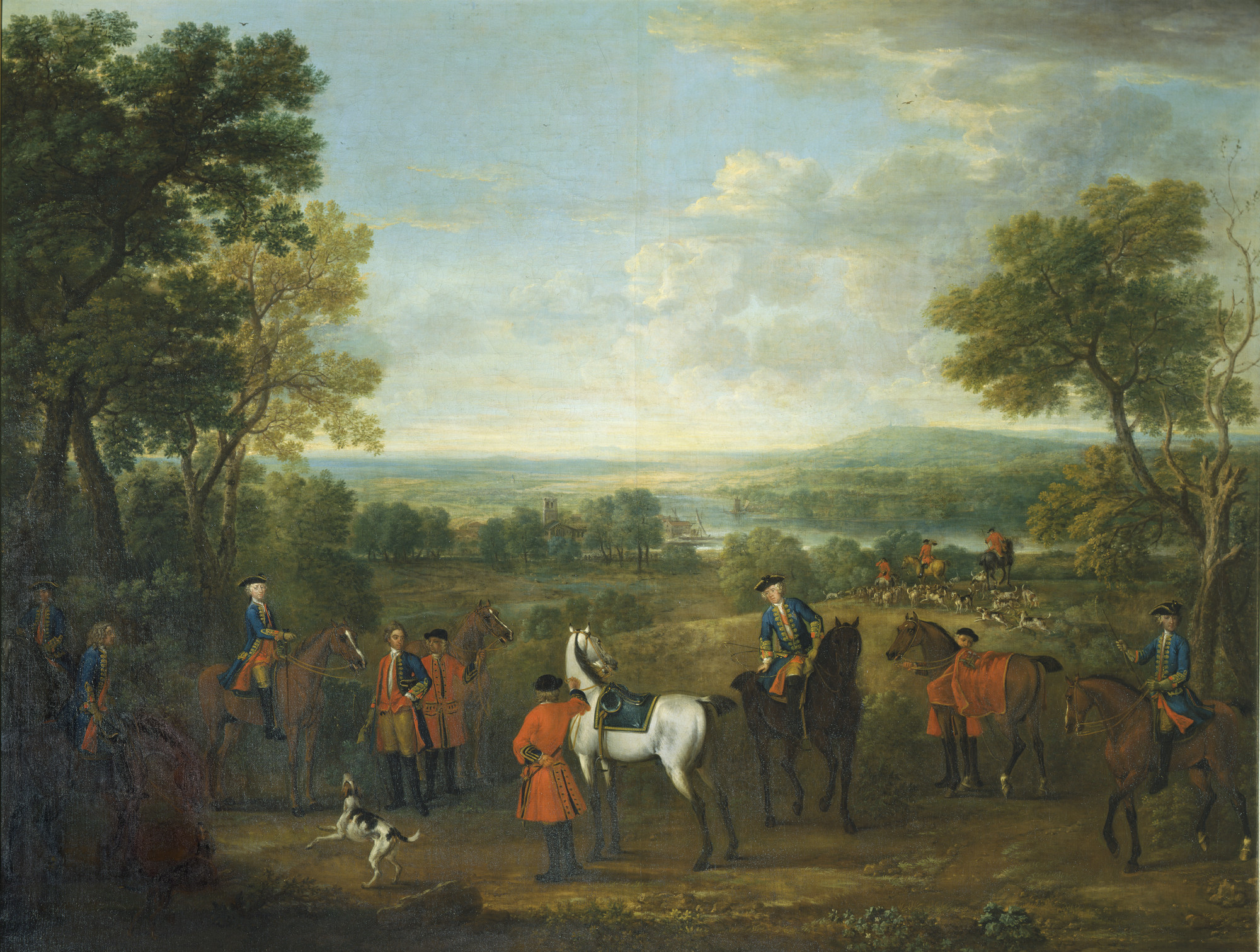
Frederick, Prince of Wales in the Hunting Field, 1734

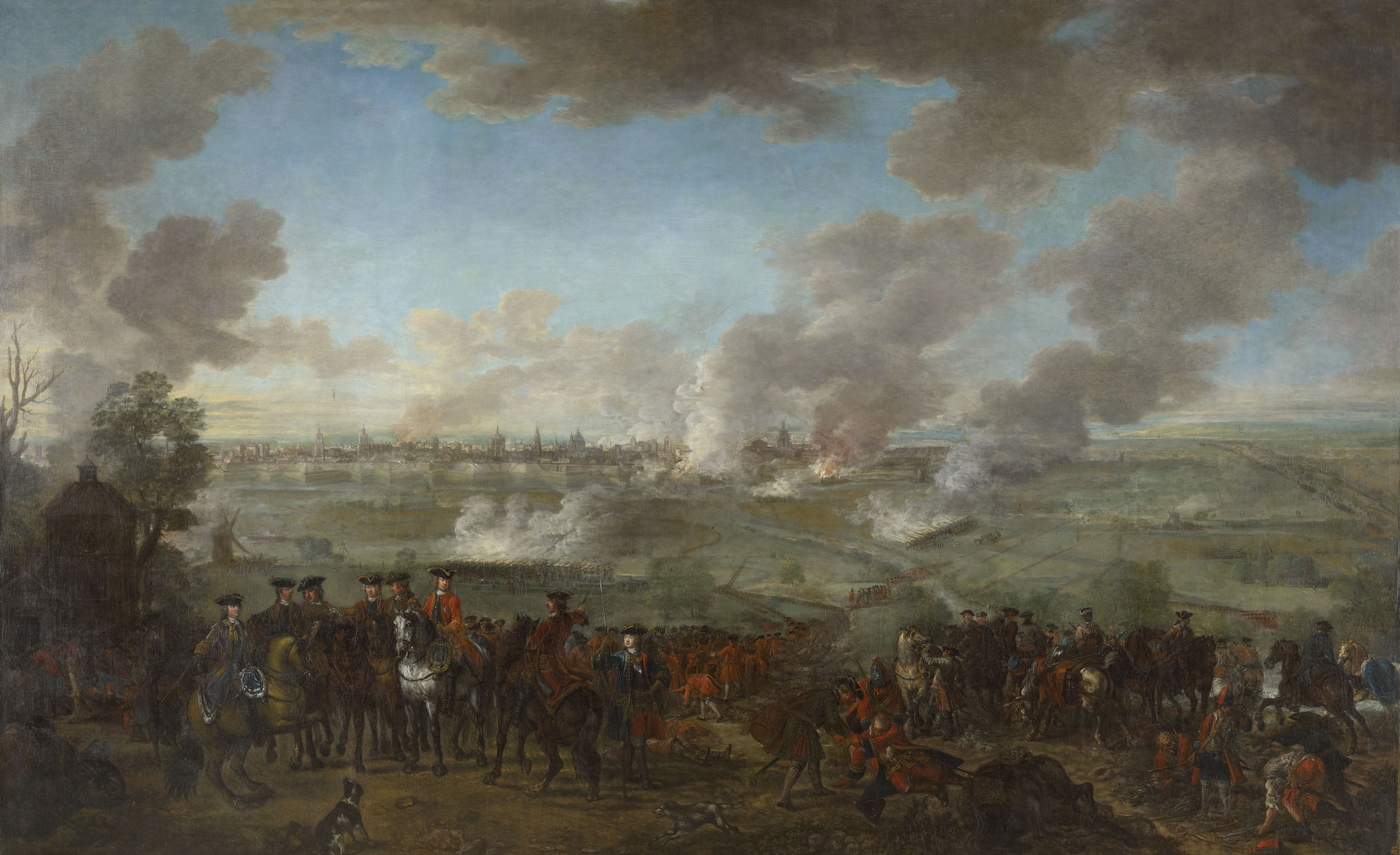
The Siege of Lille, 1742

== See also ==
- British art
- English school of painting
- List of British artists
